= Manfred Mann discography =

- Studio albums: 9
- Extended plays: 9
- Soundtrack albums: 1
- Compilation albums: 24
- Singles: 26
- Box sets: 7

This is the discography of English rock band Manfred Mann.

== Albums ==
=== Studio albums ===
Title	Album details	Peak chart positions	
Title	Album details	UK	US
The Five Faces of Manfred Mann	Released: 11 September 1964 (UK); Label: His Master's Voice; Formats: LP	3	—
The Manfred Mann Album	Released: 17 September 1964 (US); Label: Ascot; Formats: LP	—	35
The Five Faces of Manfred Mann	Released: 8 February 1965 (US); Label: Ascot; Formats: LP	—	141
My Little Red Book of Winners!	Released: 13 September 1965 (US); Label: Ascot; Formats: LP	—	—
Mann Made	Released: 15 October 1965 (UK) / 5 November 1965 (US); Label: His Master's Voice, Ascot; Formats: LP	7	—
Pretty Flamingo	Released: 19 July 1966 (US); Label: United Artists; Formats: LP	—	—
As Is	Released: 21 October 1966 (UK); Label: Fontana; Formats: LP	22	—
Mighty Garvey!	Released: 28 June 1968 (UK); Label: Fontana; Formats: LP, MC	—	—
The Mighty Quinn	Released: 6 May 1968 (US); Label: Mercury; Formats: LP	—	176
"—" denotes releases that did not chart or were not released in that territory.

=== Soundtrack albums ===
Title	Album details
Up the Junction	Released: 23 February 1968 (UK) / April 1968 (US); Label: Fontana, Mercury; Formats: LP, MC

=== Compilation albums ===
Title	Album details	Peak chart positions
Title	Album details	UK
Mann Made Hits	Released: 9 September 1966 (UK); Label: His Master's Voice; Formats: LP	11
Greatest Hits	Released: 13 October 1966 (US); Label: United Artists; Formats: LP, reel-to-reel	—
Soul of Mann	Released: 13 January 1967 (UK); Label: His Master's Voice; Formats: LP, MC	40
What a Mann	Released: 16 March 1968 (UK); Label: His Master's Voice; Formats: LP	—
This Is... Manfred Mann	Released: 12 November 1971 (UK); Label: Philips; Formats: LP	—
The Greatest Hits of Manfred Mann	Released: 12 May 1972 (UK); Label: Music for Pleasure; Formats: LP	—
The Best of Manfred Mann	Released: 15 July 1974 (US); Label: Janus; Formats: LP	—
Mannerisms	Released: 30 July 1976 (UK); Label: Philips; Formats: LP, MC	—
The Best of Manfred Mann	Released: 12 August 1977; Label: EMI, Capitol; Formats: LP, MC	—
Semi-Detached Suburban – 20 Great Hits of the 60's	Released: 24 August 1979 (UK); Label: EMI; Formats: LP, MC	9
The R&B Years	Released: March 1982 (UK); Label: See for Miles; Formats: LP, MC	—
The Very Best of Manfred Mann (1963–1966)	Released: 1 June 1984 (UK); Label: Music for Pleasure; Formats: LP, MC	—
Hit Records 1966–1969	Released: 18 April 1986 (UK); Label: Fontana; Formats: LP, MC	—
The EP Collection	Released: 3 July 1989 (UK); Label: See for Miles; Formats: CD, LP, MC	—
The Collection	Released: June 1990 (UK); Label: Castle Communications; Formats: CD, 2xLP, MC	—
The Definitive Collection	Released: 2 June 1992 (US); Label: EMI; Formats: CD, MC	—
Ages of Mann	Released: 11 January 1993 (UK); Label: PolyGram TV; Formats: CD, LP, MC	23
The Best of the EMI Years	Released: 20 May 1993 (UK); Label: EMI; Formats: CD	—
Chapter Two: The Best of the Fontana Years	Released: 4 October 1994 (US); Label: Fontana; Formats: CD, MC	—
The Ascent of Mann 1966 to 1969: The Fontana Years	Released: 30 June 1997 (UK); Label: Fontana; Formats: 2xCD	—
A's B's & EP's	Released: 5 May 2003 (UK); Label: EMI; Formats: CD	—
World of Mann: The Very Best of Manfred Mann & Manfred Mann's Earth Band	Released: 5 June 2006 (UK); Label: Universal Music TV; Formats: 2xCD	24
The Greatest Hits + More	Released: 2 October 2015 (UK); Label: Rhino; Formats: CD	62
5-4-3-2-1: The Greatest Hits	Released: 8 October 2021 (UK); Label: Decca; Formats: CD	99
"—" denotes releases that did not chart or were not released in that territory.

=== Box sets ===
Title	Album details
Four Manfred Mann Originals	Released: February 1996; Label: EMI; Formats: 4xCD
The Complete French CD EP 1964/1968	Released: June 2003; Label: Magic; Formats: 7xCD
Down the Road Apiece – Their EMI Recordings 1963–1966	Released: August 2007; Label: EMI; Formats: 4xCD
Manfred Mann EP Collection	Released: November 2013; Label: Umbrella Music; Formats: 7xCD
Original Album Series	Released: 4 August 2014; Label: Parlophone; Formats: 5xCD
The Albums 64–67	Released: 21 April 2018; Label: East Central One; Formats: 4xCD+DVD, 4xLP
The 60s	Released: 27 November 2020; Label: Umbrella Music; Formats: 11xCD

== EPs ==
Title	EP details	Peak chart positions	
Title	EP details	UK	AUS
Manfred Mann's Cock-a-Hoop	Released: 1 May 1964 (UK); Label: His Master's Voice; Formats: 7"	—	—
Groovin' with Manfred Mann	Released: 6 November 1964 (UK); Label: His Master's Voice; Formats: 7"	3	—
The One in the Middle	Released: 18 June 1965 (UK); Label: His Master's Voice; Formats: 7"	1	36
No Living Without Loving	Released: 19 November 1965 (UK); Label: His Master's Voice; Formats: 7"	1	—
Machines	Released: 1 April 1966 (UK); Label: His Master's Voice; Formats: 7"	1	—
Instrumental Asylum	Released: 3 June 1966 (UK); Label: His Master's Voice; Formats: 7"	3	—
As Was	Released: 21 October 1966 (UK); Label: His Master's Voice; Formats: 7"	4	—
Instrumental Assassination	Released: 2 December 1966 (UK); Label: His Master's Voice; Formats: 7"	—	—
Ha! Ha! Said the Clown / Mighty Quinn	Released: 12 August 1977 (UK); Label: Philips; Formats: 7"	—	—
"—" denotes releases that did not chart or were not released in that territory.

== Singles ==
Title	Year	Peak chart positions										UK Album	US Album
Title	Year	UK	AUS	CAN	GER	IRE	NL	NZ	SA	SWE	US	UK Album	US Album
"Why Should We Not" b/w "Brother Jack"	1963	—	—	—	—	—	—	—	—	—	—	Non-album tracks	A: Non-album track B: My Little Red Book of Winners!
"Cock-a-Hoop" b/w "Now You're Needing Me"	1963	—	—	—	—	—	—	—	—	—	—	Non-album tracks	Non-album tracks
"5-4-3-2-1" b/w "Without You"	1964	5	79	—	—	—	—	9	—	—	—	A: Non-album track B: The Five Faces of Manfred Mann	A: Non-album track B: The Manfred Mann Album
"Hubble Bubble (Toil and Trouble)" b/w "I'm Your Kingpin"	1964	11	—	—	—	—	—	—	—	—	—	A: Non-album track B: The Five Faces of Manfred Mann	The Five Faces of Manfred Mann
"Do Wah Diddy Diddy" b/w "What You Gonna Do?"	1964	1	2	1	4	2	6	1	2	1	1	A: Non-album track B: The Five Faces of Manfred Mann	The Manfred Mann Album
"Sha La La" b/w "John Hardy"	1964	3	52	12	36	4	—	7	—	6	12	Non-album tracks	The Five Faces of Manfred Mann
"Come Tomorrow" b/w "What Did I Do Wrong?"	1965	4	24	20	—	10	—	—	3	—	50	Non-album tracks	A: The Five Faces of Manfred Mann; B: Non-album track
"Oh No, Not My Baby" b/w "What Am I Doing Wrong?"	1965	11	67	—	—	—	—	—	19	—	—	Non-album tracks	A: My Little Red Book of Winners! B: Non-album track
"My Little Red Book" (Note: "My Little Red Book" was only released as a single in the US, Canada and Australia.) b/w "What Did I Do Wrong?"	1965	—	26	—	—	—	—	—	—	—	124	Non-album tracks	A: My Little Red Book of Winners! B: Non-album track
"If You Gotta Go, Go Now" b/w "Stay Around" (UK); "The One in the Middle" (US)	1965	2	4	—	—	4	—	—	4	7	—	Non-album tracks	A & UK B: Non-album tracks US B: My Little Red Book of Winners!
"Hi Lili, Hi Lo" (Note: "Hi Lili, Hi Lo" was only released as a single in Australia and Germany.) b/w "You Don't Know Me"	1965	—	19	—	—	—	—	—	—	—	—	Mann Made	Mann Made
"She Needs Company" (Note: "She Needs Company" was only released as a single in the US, Canada and Germany.) b/w "Hi Lili, Hi Lo"	1966	—	—	—	—	—	—	—	—	—	—	A: Non-album track B: Mann Made	A: Non-album track B: Mann Made
"Pretty Flamingo" b/w "You're Standing By"	1966	1	3	2	12	1	15	1	2	6	29	Non-album tracks	Pretty Flamingo
"You Gave Me Somebody to Love" b/w "Poison Ivy"	1966	36	98	—	—	—	—	—	—	—	—	Non-album tracks	My Little Red Book of Winners!
"Just Like a Woman" b/w "I Wanna Be Rich"	1966	10	24	—	—	—	—	3	5	1	101	A: As Is; B: Non-album track	Non-album tracks
"When Will I Be Loved" (Note: "When Will I Be Loved" was only released as a single in the US and Canada.) b/w "Do You Have to Do That"	1966	—	—	—	—	—	—	—	—	—	—	Non-album tracks	A: Non-album track B: Pretty Flamingo
"Semi-Detached, Suburban Mr. James" b/w "Morning After the Party" (UK); "Each and Every Day" (US)	1966	2	32	—	16	5	18	3	11	10	—	A: Non-album track UK B: As Is; US B: Mighty Garvey!	A and US B: The Mighty Quinn; UK B: Non-album track
"You're My Girl" (Note: "You're My Girl" was only released as a single in Sweden and Norway.) b/w "Box Office Draw"	1967	—	—	—	—	—	—	—	—	—	—	As Is	Non-album tracks
"Ha! Ha! Said the Clown" b/w "Feeling So Good"	1967	4	11	—	1	7	1	2	1	5	—	A: Mighty Garvey! B: Non-album track	A: The Mighty Quinn; B: Non-album track
"Sweet Pea" b/w "One Way"	1967	36	—	—	—	—	—	—	—	—	—	Non-album tracks	Non-album tracks
"So Long, Dad" b/w "Funniest Gig"	1967	52 (Note: Chart position is from the official UK "Breakers List".)	—	—	—	—	—	8	—	—	—	Non-album tracks	Non-album tracks
"Mighty Quinn" b/w "By Request – Edwin Garvey"	1968	1	8	3	1	1	2	1	1	1	10	A: Mighty Garvey! B: Non-album track	A: The Mighty Quinn; B: Non-album track
"(Theme from) Up the Junction" b/w "Sleepy Hollow"	1968	52	—	—	—	—	18	—	—	—	—	A: Up the Junction; B: Non-album track	A: Up the Junction; B: Non-album track
"My Name Is Jack" b/w "There Is a Man"	1968	8	7	27	7	13	16	10	19	—	104	Non-album tracks	Non-album tracks
"Fox on the Run" b/w "Too Many People"	1968	5	7	97	7	2	—	1	4	10	97	Non-album tracks	Non-album tracks
"Ragamuffin Man" b/w "A 'B' Side"	1969	8	18	—	19	10	—	5	—	—	—	Non-album tracks	Non-album tracks
"—" denotes releases that did not chart or were not released in that territory.

== See also ==
- Manfred Mann's Earth Band discography
