= Mann Made Hits =

1966 compilation album by Manfred Mann

Compilation album by Manfred Mann with Paul Jones
- Released: 9 September 1966
- Recorded: 17 December 1963 – 18 March 1966
- Studios: EMI, London
- Genres: Pop; R&B
- Length: 37:56
- Label: His Master's Voice
- Producer: John Burgess

Manfred Mann chronology
Instrumental Asylum (1966)	Mann Made Hits (1966)	As Is (1966)

Manfred Mann album chronology
Mann Made (1965)	Mann Made Hits (1966)	As Is (1966)

Paul Jones chronology
Mann Made Hits (1966)	My Way (1966)

Mann Made Hits is the first compilation album by British pop group Manfred Mann. After lead vocalist Paul Jones left the band in mid-1966, EMI Records chose to sign him as a solo performer once the band's contract expired. When the band signed with Fontana Records, EMI started issuing archival recordings in response. Mann Made Hits is made up of 14 recordings taped at EMI Studios between December 1963 and March 1966, and includes most of Manfred Mann's hit singles released during their contract with EMI alongside B-sides and EP tracks.

His Master's Voice released Mann Made Hits on 9 September 1966, credited as "Manfred Mann with Paul Jones" to capitalize on Jones' solo career. The album became a commercial success and Manfred Mann's final top-20 album for a decade, reaching number 11 on Record Retailer's albums chart. It has since been reissued on CD with various bonus tracks added. It received primarily favourable reviews upon the release, with music critics praising the selection of songs included. Retrospective assessment has considered it one of Manfred Mann's best vinyl compilation albums.

== Background and content ==
Mid-1966 became a tumultous period for Manfred Mann as a group. Bassist Jack Bruce left the band to form Cream, and lead vocalist Paul Jones, who had grown "restless and wanted to pursue a solo career as well as acting", also left the band. Additionally, their three-year contract with EMI signed in May 1963 lapsed in May 1966. EMI, who "had sufficient doubts about the group's ability to continue", did not renew their contract and instead signed Jones for a solo career. After recruiting bassist Klaus Voormann and lead vocalist Mike d'Abo, Manfred Mann signed a recording contract with Fontana Records. In response, EMI "scoured their tape archive" with unreleased material by Manfred Mann, then consisting of tens of unissued songs. As the first of several "cash-ins", on 1 July 1966, EMI released the archive recording "You Gave Me Somebody to Love" as a single. Manfred Mann publicly denounced the song's release in the music press, and it stalled at number 36 on the Record Retailer singles chart.

The material presented on Mann Made Hits was taped sporadically during different sessions over a period of nearly 2 and a half years. According to Manfred Mann guitarist Tom McGuinness, all of the sessions during the band's tenure with EMI were recorded at EMI Studios in London and produced by John Burgess with Norman Smith engineering. Below is a sessionography of the songs featured on Mann Made Hits in chronological order:

- "5-4-3-2-1" was recorded on 17 December 1963
- "I'm Your Kingpin" was recorded on 6 March 1964
- "Do Wah Diddy Diddy" was recorded on 11 and 22 June 1964
- "Groovin'" was recorded on 23 June 1964
- "The One in the Middle" was recorded on 28 July 1964
- "John Hardy" was recorded on 2 September 1964
- "Sha La La" was recorded on 23 September 1964
- "Come Tomorrow" was recorded on 16 and 26 November 1964
- "With God on Our Side" was recorded on 11 January 1965
- "Oh No Not My Baby" was recorded on 12, 16 and 17 March 1965
- "If You Gotta Go, Go Now" was recorded on 19 July 1965
- "There's No Living Without Your Loving" was recorded on 2 August and 30 September 1965
- "Spirit Feel" was recorded on 15 December 1965
- "Pretty Flamingo" was recorded on 18 March 1966

With the exception of April 1964's "Hubble Bubble (Toil and Trouble)", Mann Made Hits feature all of Manfred Mann's eight single A-sides between January 1964's "5-4-3-2-1" and March 1966's "Pretty Flamingo", seven of which made the top-20 of the Record Retailer singles chart in the UK, including the two number-ones "Do Wah Diddy Diddy" and "Pretty Flamingo". "I'm Your Kingpin" had originally appeared as the B-side of "Hubble Bubble (Toil and Trouble)", and "John Hardy" had appeared as the B-side of October 1964's "Sha La La". Three of the tracks were originally released on EPs; "Groovin'" (from June 1964's Groovin' with Manfred Mann) plus "The One in the Middle" and "With God on Our Side" (from June 1965's The One in the Middle). The remaining track, "Spirit Feel", was a previously unissued instrumental. Genre-wise, the album encompasses everything from Manfred Mann's R&B-focused work ("Oh No, Not My Baby"), folk-influenced output ("With God on Our Side"), and their pop hits according to Bruce Eder of AllMusic.

== Release and commercial performance ==
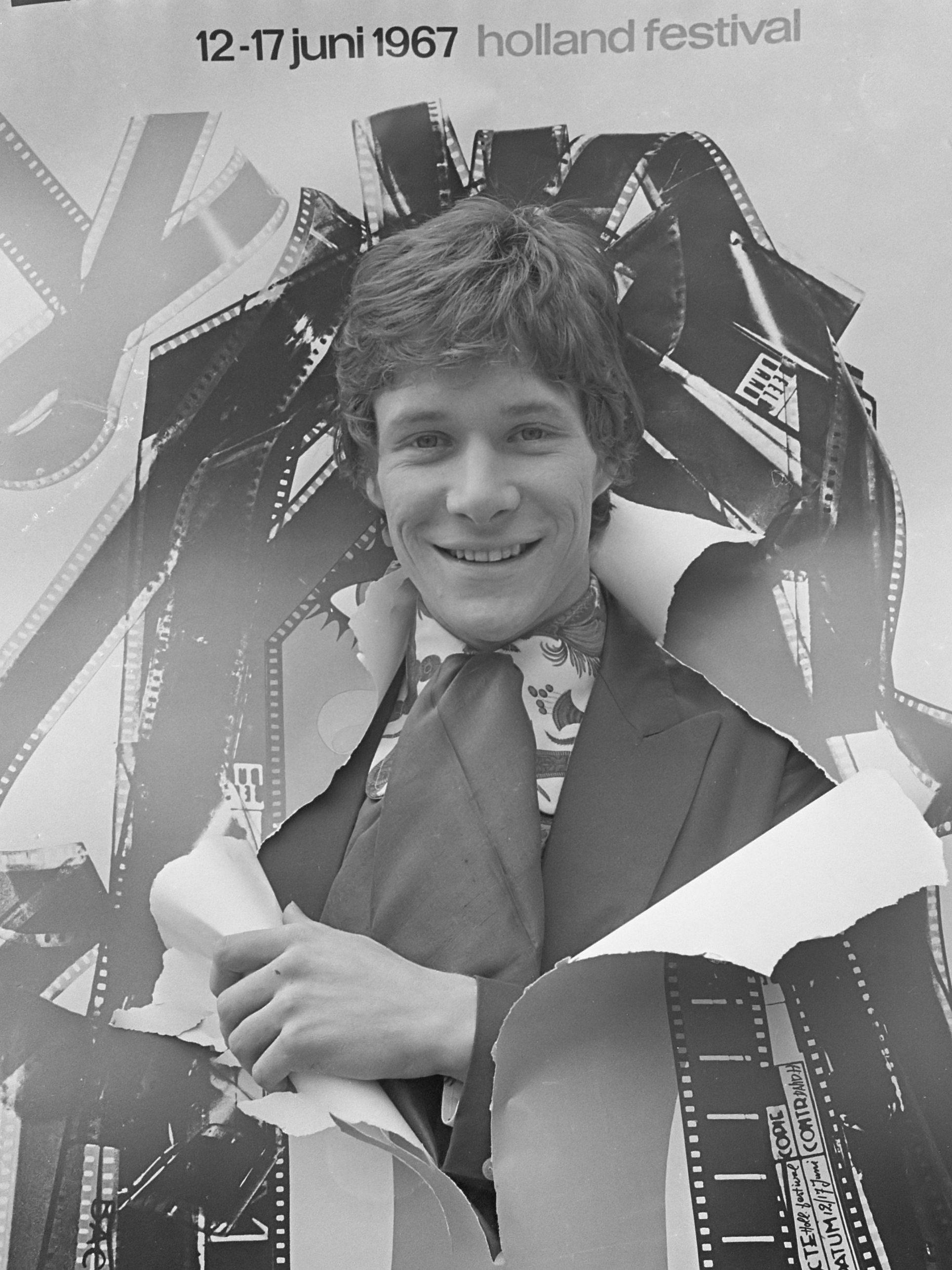
The compilation is credited under former singer Paul Jones' name.

EMI released Mann Made Hits through their sublabel His Master's Voice on 9 September 1966. The album's title was a reference to Mann Made, which was the group' second studio album released in October 1965. It was the band's first compilation album "devoted" to their hits. According to Bruce Eder, one could see "quandary EMI was in" when they released the album; believing the band's prospects were limited, the album is credited as "Manfred Mann with Paul Jones". In contrast, band biographer Greg Russo writes that the album's title was an "acknowledgement" to Jones' departure from the group.

Mann Made Hits debuted on Record Retailer's album chart at 21 on 17 September 1966, before peaking at number 11 across three consecutive weeks between 29 October and 12 November. It dropped out of the chart on 14 January 1967 at number 36, having spent 14 weeks in the top 50. On the Disc and Music Echo chart, Mann Made Hits peaked at number 10 for a week. Mann Made Hits was the final Manfred Mann album to reach the top-20 in the UK until the 1979 compilation Semi Detached Suburban. Russo opined that Manfred Mann's album sales went into a "heavy decline", starting with the follow-up album As Is (1966), which peaked at number 22.

In Canada, Capitol Records released Mann Made Hits during September 1967. This issue marked the debut release of an unedited version of "Do Wah Diddy Diddy" featuring an organ solo. According to Russo, this was done by mistake. Mann Made Hits has been "supplanted by" several other Manfred Mann compilations, but has been rereleased in itself on multiple occasions; in 2003, it was reissued on CD in Japan in a version that featured 13 bonus tracks that "show off the jazzier, more experimental side of their sound". For Record Store Day 2018, Mann Made Hits was released on a box set together with the band's other EMI albums.

== Critical reception ==
Professional ratings
Review scores
Source	Rating
Record Mirror	4/4 stars
Western Daily Press	8/10
AllMusic	4.5/5 stars

At release, Mann Made Hits received primarily positive reviews in the music press. Writing for Disc and Music Echo, Penny Valentine opined that the album gave fans "a pretty generous helping of pre [Mike] d'Abo Manfred Mann", and singled out the inclusion of "Do Wah Diddy Diddy", "Come Tomorrow", and "Oh No Not My Baby". Though they felt they couldn't say much about the album "critically speaking" as it was a compilation, Norman Jopling and Peter Jones of Record Mirror felt that it "provided valuable reference to the hit-making days" before the Jones left. They praise John Burgess' production, opining that he "understands completely the group's musical needs. The reviewer for the Liverpool Echo felt that "seldom has one LP crowded together such a wealth of Top 20 material". David Surrey of The Journal believed the album represented a chronological journey, ranging from the "earliest simplicities" of "5-4-3-2-1" and "Sha La La" to "their biggest hit" "Pretty Flamingo".

Maurice Fells of the Western Daily Press praised the inclusion of some "great B-sides", and labelled it a "must have party record for sheer sustained meaty quality". On the contrary the reviewer for Pontypridd and Llantrisant Observer felt that the non-singles on the album were "wasted on little known B-sides". Retrospectively, writing for AllMusic, Bruce Eder felt that Mann Made Hits was "one of the great dance albums of its era and has held up about as well as those hits". He felt that it was the "about the best original vinyl compilation" when it came to Manfred Mann's music. Eder further believed it was a "killer farewell to the Paul Jones-era" of the band. Additionally, he believed that the 2003 reissue had bonus tracks that acted as proof that "there is always more to add".

== Track listing ==
Songwriting credits adapted from the 2018 reissue of Mann Made Hits. Original release dates taken from Greg Russo's book Mannerisms: The Five Phases of Manfred Mann.

Side one
No.	Title	Writer(s)	Original UK release	Length
1.	"Pretty Flamingo"	Mark Barkan	Single A-Side, April 1966	2:30
2.	"The One in The Middle"	Paul Jones	The One in the Middle EP, June 1965	2:39
3.	"Oh No Not My Baby"	Gerry Goffin; Carole King	Single A-Side, April 1965	2:22
4.	"John Hardy"	Traditional, arranged by: Paul Jones; Manfred Mann; Mike Hugg; Tom McGuinness; Mike Vickers	Single B-side, October 1964	2:05
5.	"Spirit Feel"	Jon Hendricks; Milt Jackson	Previously unreleased	2:42
6.	"Come Tomorrow"	Bob Elgin; Dolores Phillips; Frank Augustus	Single A-side, January 1965	2:44
7.	"Do Wah Diddy Diddy"	Jeff Barry; Ellie Greenwich	Single A-side, June 1964	2:23
Total length:				17:25

Side two
No.	Title	Writer(s)	Original UK release	Length
1.	"There's No Living Without Your Loving"	Jerry Harris; Paul Kaufman	No Living Without Loving EP, also single A-side, November 1965	2:40
2.	"With God on Our Side"	Bob Dylan	The One in the Middle EP, June 1965	4:23
3.	"Groovin'"	Ben E. King; James Bethea	Groovin' with Manfred Mann EP, November 1964	3:41
4.	"I'm Your Kingpin"	Paul Jones; Manfred Mann	Single B-side, April 1964	2:46
5.	"Sha La La"	Robert Mosely; Robert Napoleon Taylor	Single A-side, October 1964	2:31
6.	"5-4-3-2-1"	Paul Jones; Manfred Mann; Mike Hugg	Single A-side, January 1964	1:59
7.	"If You Gotta Go, Go Now"	Bob Dylan	Single A-side, September 1965	2:31
Total length:				20:31

== Charts ==
Weekly chart performance for Mann Made Hits
Chart (1966–1967)	Peak position
UK Disc and Music Echo Top Ten LPs	10
UK Record Retailer LPs Chart	11
