= Manfred Mann's Cock-a-Hoop =

Manfred Mann's Cock-A-Hoop

EP by Manfred Mann
- Released: 3 April 1964
- Recorded: 13 June, 30 September, 17 December 1963
- Studios: EMI Studios, London
- Genre: Rock and roll
- Language: English
- Label: His Master's Voice
- Producer: John Burgess

Manfred Mann chronology
Manfred Mann's Cock-A-Hoop (1964)	The Five Faces of Manfred Mann (1964)

Manfred Mann EP chronology
Manfred Mann's Cock-A-Hoop (1964)	Groovin' with Manfred Mann (1964)

Singles from Manfred Mann's Cock-A-Hoop
- 1. "Cock-a-Hoop" Released: 8 November 1963; 2. "5-4-3-2-1" Released: 10 January 1964

Manfred Mann's Cock-A-Hoop is an EP by Manfred Mann, released in 1964. The EP is a 7-inch vinyl record and released in mono with the catalogue number His Master's Voice 7EG 8848.

== Track listing ==
Side 1

1. "5-4-3-2-1" (Jones, Hugg, Mann)
2. "Cock-a-Hoop" (Jones)

Side 2

1. "Without You" (Jones)
2. "Why Should We Not" (Mann)

== Background ==
Manfred Mann's first EP featured their first two singles Why Should We Not and Cock-a-Hoop, released in July and October 1963. Neither of them charted. 5-4-3-2-1 was written as the theme song for the TV show Ready Steady Go and in February 1964 reached # 5 on the British charts.

== Personnel ==
- Manfred Mann - keyboards
- Mike Vickers - guitar, alto saxophone, flute
- Mike Hugg - drums and vibes
- Paul Jones - lead vocals, harmonica
- Tom McGuinness - bass guitar on "5-4-3-2-1" and "Without You"
- Dave Richmond - bass guitar on "Why Should We Not" and "Cock-a-Hoop"
