= Come Tomorrow (Marie Knight song) =

1961 single by Marie Knight, later covered by pop group Manfred Mann

Single by Marie Knight
- B-side: "There's Nothing In The World"
- Released: October 1961
- Genre: Rhythm and blues
- Length: 2:44
- Label: Okeh
- Songwriters: Bob Elgin; Dolores Phillips; Frank Augustus

Marie Knight singles chronology
"Hope You Won't Hold It Against Me" (1960)	"Come Tomorrow" (1961)	"What Kind Of A Fool (Do You Think I Am?)" (1962)

"Come Tomorrow" is a song written by American songwriters Bob Elgin, Dolores Phillips and Frank Augustus for rhythm and blues singer Marie Knight, who issued it as a single in October 1961 through Okeh Records, a release which received good reviews, though failed to chart. The best known version of the song was recorded by British pop band Manfred Mann, who took it to the top-ten in the United Kingdom in 1965.

== Marie Knight version ==
The original version of "Come Tomorrow" was cut by singer Marie Knight. Knight, originally from the US, had become important for the blossoming merseybeat scene in the UK, with a visit to the Cavern Club in Liverpool in 1958 bringing her to the attention of the skiffle groups of the time. Despite having recorded for well over ten years by 1961, she had only seen small commercial success. Her best performing single on the Billboard Hot 100 up until that point was a duet with Rex Garvin, "I Can't Sit Down", which had reached number 94 in 1959. In an attempt to get her to record more hits, writers Bob Elgin, Dolores Phillips and Frank Augustus specifically wrote a "pop song" for Knight to record, being "Come Tomorrow"

"Come Tomorrow" was released in October 1961 through Okeh Records. The release of the single was Okeh's first for almost a year, and Epic Records re-activated the label specifically for the single's release. It was backed by "There's Nothing In The World", written by Elgin, Augustus along with Clarence Lewis. Upon release, it received positive reviews in the US press. The staff writer for Billboard calls it a "rich, moving vocal", further stating it to be a "spiritual-favored theme" with "strong emotional impact." In Cash Box, the single was chosen as a pick of the week, calling it a "powerhouse release", claiming that Knight never sounded better than she did on "Come Tomorrow". They write that it may become a hit because of the Latin beat "sporting a beautiful, string-highlighted instrumental showcase."

Despite the positive reviews the single received, it did not chart in the US on neither the Billboard nor Cash Box charts. Following the hit version by Manfred Mann, Okeh re-released Knight's original version in March 1965, though it again failed to chart.

== Manfred Mann version ==
"Come Tomorrow"
- Dutch single sleeve

Single by Manfred Mann
- B-side: "What Did I Do Wrong?"
- Released: January 7, 1965
- Recorded: November 9, 16 & 26, 1964
- Studio: EMI, London
- Genre: Pop rock
- Length: 2:44
- Label: His Master's Voice
- Songwriters: Elgin; Phillips; Augustus
- Producer: John Burgess

Manfred Mann UK singles chronology
"Sha La La" (1964)	"Come Tomorrow" (1965)	"Oh No Not My Baby" (1965)

Manfred Mann US singles chronology
"Sha La La" (1964)	"Come Tomorrow" (1965)	"My Little Red Book" (1965)

=== Background and recording ===
We were working our way through my record collection. I had "Doo Wah Diddy Diddy" by the Exciters, "Sha La La" by the Shirelles, "Oh No Not My Baby" by Maxine Brown and "Come Tomorrow" by Marie Knight. I always had something that we ought to do.

— Paul Jones

By the end of 1964, British pop group Manfred Mann had established themselves as a worldwide success. Their breakthrough single, a cover of the Exciters, "Do Wah Diddy Diddy", reached number one in both the United Kingdom and the United States during the autumn of that year. The follow-up to that single was a cover of "Sha La La" by the Shirelles, which became a top-ten hit in the UK and peaked in the top-twenty across the Atlantic. This established Manfred Mann with a distinct sound, dominated by the organ performed by keyboardist Manfred Mann.

Like many other songs by Manfred Mann during this era, "Come Tomorrow" was introduced to the band by lead singer Paul Jones, who owned a copy of it. The song differentiates from their contemporary sound in that the organ is not prominent, instead having a flute played by guitarist Mike Vickers mixed high on the song. According to author Greg Russo, Manfred Mann begun recording the song on November 9, 1964, adding overdubs on November 16. However, in the liner notes for their compilation box Down the Road Apiece, it is noted as having been recorded on November 16 with overdubs added on November 26. The sessions also completed other songs, including "What Did I Do Wrong?" which would end up as the B-side. Russo describes the session of the song to have been relaxed, in that "laughing and talking" could be heard on it. The session was produced by John Burgess and took place at EMI Studios in London.

Paul Jones recorded a German language vocal track, with lyrics written by Fred Oldörp, specifically for the German market. This release, titled "Weine Nicht" ("Pretty Baby") was released as the B-side to "Sie" ("She") a month after the original version, though it failed to chart.

=== Release and reception ===
Focusing on the success of their recent singles in the United States, the release for "Come Tomorrow" was targeted for that territory through Ascot Records on January 7, 1965. (Note: Catalogue number Ascot AS 2170.) It was released in the United Kingdom the day after on January 8, through His Master's Voice. (Note: Catalogue number His Master's Voice POP 1381.) The B-side was "What Did I Do Wrong?", which according to Russo was a "slow blues with nice vibes and sax solos". It followed the standard by Manfred Mann of having an outside writer composing the A-side, while the group themselves wrote the B-side. The release of the ballad came as a surprise for many of the group's fans, with Mann stating that "it was a complete break away for us" and that the single gave them the recognition of being the "top Ballroom-draw" in the United Kingdom.

It entered the UK Record Retailer chart on January 20, 1965 at number 26. It peaked at number 4 on February 10, before exiting the chart after nine weeks on March 17 at number 29. In the United States, the song would not enter the Billboard chart until February 20, at a position of number 89. It peaked at number 50 a month later before dropping out of the charts. It fared similar in the other American charts at the time, reaching number 52 in Cash Box, and number 42 in Record World. Russo attributes this lack of chart success to the fact that Manfred Mann did not tour the United States due to costs. It nonetheless did better than "Sha La La" across Europe, though was not as successful as "Do Wah Diddy Diddy".

=== Charts ===
Weekly chart performance for "Come Tomorrow"
Chart (1965)	Peak position
Australia (Kent Music Report)	24
Canada Top Singles (RPM)	20
Finland (Suomen Virallinen)	30
Ireland (IRMA)	10
South Africa (Springbok Radio)	3
Sweden (Tio i Topp)	14
UK (Fab 40)	1
UK (New Musical Express)	4
UK (Record Retailer)	4
US Billboard Hot 100	50
US Cashbox Top 100	52
US Record World 100 Top Pops	42

== Notes and references ==
Notes

=== Sources ===
- Bronson, Fred (1988). The Billboard Book of Number One Hits. Billboard Publications. ISBN 978-08-511-23-967.
- Brown, Tony (2000). The Complete Book of the British Charts. Omnibus Press. ISBN 0-7119-7670-8.
- McGuinness, Tom (2007). Manfred Mann – Down The Road Apiece - Their EMI Recordings 1963-1966 (CD). EMI Records. 397 2152.
- Russo, Greg (2011). Mannerisms: The Five Phases of Manfred Mann. Crossfire Publications. ISBN 9780979184529.
- Whitburn, Joel (2014). Joel Whitburn's Cash Box Pop Hits, 1952-1996. Record Research. ISBN 978-08-982-020-90.
