= Mann Made =

Studio album by Manfred Mann
- Released: 8 October 1965 (UK); 5 November 1965 (US); 6 June 1966 (Canada)
- Recorded: 11 January – 10 June 1965
- Studios: Abbey Road Studios, London
- Genres: R&B; beat; pop; jazz
- Language: English
- Labels: His Master's Voice (UK); Ascot (US); Capitol (Canada)
- Producer: John Burgess

Manfred Mann chronology
The One in the Middle (1965)	Mann Made (1965)	No Living Without Loving (1965)

Manfred Mann album chronology
The Five Faces of Manfred Mann (1964)	Mann Made (1965)	Mann Made Hits (1966)

Professional ratings
Review scores
Source	Rating
Record Mirror	4/5 stars
Uncut	3/5 stars

Mann Made is the second British and fourth American studio album by Manfred Mann, released in October 1965 on His Master's Voice in the United Kingdom, and November 1965 on Ascot Records in the United States. It was the group's final recording project with original members Mike Vickers and Paul Jones, as well as their last to be recorded at Abbey Road Studios, London, England, before switching to Fontana Records.

The album was reduced to twelve songs by Capitol Records in the Canadian market, where "You're for Me", "I Really Do Believe", and "Hi Lili, Hi Lo" were excluded, and replaced by "She Needs Company" along with the hit single "Pretty Flamingo" for the June 1966 release.

== Track listing ==
=== Original UK/US release ===
Side one
No.	Title	Writer(s)	Length
1.	"Since I Don't Have You"	Jackie Taylor, James Beaumont, Janet Vogel, Joseph Rock, Joe Verscharen, Lennie Martin, Wally Lester	2:35
2.	"You're for Me"	Mike Vickers	2:53
3.	"Look Away"	Norman Meade, Bert Russell	2:18
4.	"The Abominable Snowmann" (instrumental)	Vickers	2:43
5.	"Watch Your Step"	Bobby Parker	2:13
6.	"Stormy Monday Blues"	T-Bone Walker; credited to Bob Crowder, Earl Hines, Billy Eckstine	3:39
7.	"I Really Do Believe"	Paul Jones	3:05

Side two
No.	Title	Writer(s)	Length
8.	"Hi-Lili, Hi-Lo"	Helen Deutsch, Bronisław Kaper	2:40
9.	"The Way You Do the Things You Do"	Smokey Robinson, Bobby Rogers	2:41
10.	"Bare Hugg" (instrumental)	Mike Hugg	3:50
11.	"You Don't Know Me"	Eddy Arnold, Cindy Walker	3:54
12.	"L.S.D."	Tom McGuinness	3:50
13.	"I'll Make It Up to You"	Ragovoy, Ben Raleigh	3:14

=== Original Canadian release ===
Side one
No.	Title	Writer(s)	Length
1.	"Pretty Flamingo"	Mark Barkan	2:34
2.	"Since I Don't Have You"	Taylor, Beaumont, Vogel, Rock, Verscharen, Martin, Lester	2:35
3.	"Look Away"	Ragovoy, Russell	2:18
4.	"The Abominable Snowmann" (instrumental)	Vickers	2:43
5.	"Watch Your Step"	Parker	2:13
6.	"Stormy Monday Blues"	Walker	3:39

Side two
No.	Title	Writer(s)	Length
7.	"She Needs Company"	Jones	2:46
8.	"The Way You Do the Things You Do"	Robinson, Rogers	2:41
9.	"Bare Hugg" (instrumental)	Hugg	3:50
10.	"You Don't Know Me"	Arnold, Walker	3:54
11.	"L.S.D."	McGuinness	3:50
12.	"I'll Make It Up to You"	Ragovoy, Raleigh	3:14

== Recording sessions ==
All of the songs were recorded 11 January–10 June 1965, at Abbey Road Studios, London, England, except 4 February and 18 March 1966 for "She Needs Company" and "Pretty Flamingo", respectively:

- "I'll Make It Up to You" – 11 January 1965
- "Look Away" – 15 January 1965
- "Bare Hugg" – 4 March 1965
- "L.S.D." – 16 March 1965
- "The Way You Do the Things You Do", "The Abominable Snowmann", "Watch Your Step", "Stormy Monday Blues" – 6 April 1965
- "I Really Do Believe", "You Don't Know Me" – 8 April 1965
- "Since I Don't Have You" – 18 May 1965
- "You're for Me" – 24 May 1965
- "You Don't Know Me", "Hi-Lili, Hi-Lo" – 10 June 1965

== Personnel ==
Manfred Mann

- Manfred Mann – Hammond organ, keyboards, backing vocals
- Paul Jones – lead vocals, harmonica
- Mike Vickers – guitars, saxes, flutes, backing vocals
- Tom McGuinness – bass, backing vocals, liner notes, guitar on "Pretty Flamingo"
- Mike Hugg – drums, percussion, vibes
- Jack Bruce – bass and backing vocals on "She Needs Company" and "Pretty Flamingo"

Production and additional personnel

- John Burgess – producer, mixing
- Henry Lowther – trumpet on "She Needs Company"
- Lyn Dobson – saxophone on "She Needs Company", flute solo on "Pretty Flamingo"
- Norman Smith – engineer, mixing
- Nicholas Wright – photography

== Release history ==
Date	Label	Format	Country	Catalog	Notes
8 October 1965	His Master's Voice	LP	UK	CLP 1911	Original mono release.
8 October 1965	His Master's Voice	LP	UK	CSD 1628	Original stereo release.
5 November 1965	Ascot	LP	US	ALM 13024	Original mono release.
5 November 1965	Ascot	LP	US	ALS 13024	Original stereo release.
6 June 1966	Capitol	LP	Canada	T 6187	Original mono release.
November 1969	Regal Starline	LP	UK	SRS 5007	
3 October 1997	EMI	CD	UK	DORIG 119	Original CD release.
29 January 2003	EMI	CD	Japan	TOCP-67111	Reissue of the Stereo album plus mono bonus tracks under the title Mann Made Plus.
25 February 2014	Parlophone	SHM-CD	Japan	WPCR-15488	Reissue of the original UK cover Mono album plus stereo and mono bonus tracks in a replica LP sleeve.
25 February 2014	Parlophone	SHM-CD	Japan	WPCR-15489	Reissue of the original US cover Mono album plus stereo and mono bonus tracks in a replica LP sleeve.
4 November 2014	Sundazed	LP	US	LP 5197	Reissue of the original US cover Stereo album.

== See also ==
- Manfred Mann discography
