= The Manfred Mann Album =

Studio album by Manfred Mann
- Released: 17 September 1964
- Recorded: 17 December 1963 – 22 June 1964
- Studios: EMI Studios, London
- Genres: Rhythm and blues; rock and roll; pop rock; jazz
- Label: Ascot
- Producer: John Burgess

Manfred Mann American chronology
The Manfred Mann Album (1964)	The Five Faces of Manfred Mann (1965)

The Manfred Mann Album is the debut American studio album by Manfred Mann, released in September 1964 on Ascot Records. It contains the hit single "Do Wah Diddy Diddy", as well as covers of well-known R&B hits such as "Smokestack Lightning" by Howlin' Wolf, "I'm Your Hoochie Coochie Man" by Muddy Waters, and "Down the Road Apiece" by Will Bradley. Modern reviews of the album are generally positive and consider The Manfred Mann Album an important piece during the heyday of the British Invasion.

== Background ==
The twelve tracks on the record include the group's hit single "Do Wah Diddy Diddy", which reached No. 1 on the Billboard Hot 100 chart, while the rest reflect on their love of R&B, including cover versions of Howlin' Wolf's "Smokestack Lightning", Muddy Waters' "Got My Mojo Working", and Bo Diddley's "Bring It to Jerome". The album includes the Cannonball Adderley song "Sack O' Woe".

Eleven of the twelve tracks were taken from Manfred Mann's debut British release, The Five Faces of Manfred Mann.

== Reception ==
Professional ratings
Review scores
Source	Rating
AllMusic	3/5 stars

In his retrospective review of the release, Richie Unterberger for AllMusic wrote “Manfred Mann's debut full-length U.S. platter was probably their strongest, and indeed one of the stronger British Invasion albums of the very competitive year of 1964. Besides the smash "Do Wah Diddy Diddy," it contained a number of fine soul and R&B covers. Standouts were the versions of "Untie Me" and Ike & Tina Turner's "It's Gonna Work Out Fine", as well as the strong pounding Paul Jones original, "Without You."

== Track listing ==
All credits adapted from the original releases.

Side one
No.	Title	Writer(s)	Length
1.	"Do Wah Diddy Diddy"	Ellie Greenwich, Jeff Barry	2:19
2.	"Don't Ask Me What I Say"	Paul Jones	3:03
3.	"Sack O' Woe"	Julian Adderley	2:10
4.	"What You Gonna Do?"	Jones, Manfred Mann	2:38
5.	"I'm Your Hoochie Coochie Man"	Willie Dixon	3:22
6.	"Smokestack Lightning"	Chester Burnett	3:27

Side two
No.	Title	Writer(s)	Length
7.	"Got My Mojo Working"	McKinley Morganfield	3:07
8.	"It's Gonna Work Out Fine"	Rose Marie McCoy, Sylvia McKinney; credited to Joe Seneca, J. Lee	2:33
9.	"Down the Road Apiece"	Don Raye	2:18
10.	"Untie Me"	Joe South	3:41
11.	"Bring It to Jerome"	Jerome Greene	3:31
12.	"Without You"	Jones	2:25

== Recording sessions ==
All of the songs were recorded 17 December 1963 – 22 June 1964 at EMI Studios, London, England:

- 17 December: "Without You"
- 5 February: "I'm Your Hoochie Coochie Man", "Down the Road Apiece", "Sack O' Woe"
- 6 March: "Got My Mojo Working", "Smokestack Lightning"
- 10 April: "Bring It to Jerome", "Untie Me"
- 5 May: "Untie Me", "Don't Ask Me What I Say", "It's Gonna Work Out Fine"
- 5 June: "What You Gonna Do?"
- 11 & 22 June: "Do Wah Diddy Diddy"

== Personnel ==
Manfred Mann

- Manfred Mann – keyboards, backing vocals
- Paul Jones – lead vocals, harmonica
- Mike Vickers – guitars, saxes, flutes, backing vocals
- Tom McGuinness – bass, backing vocals
- Mike Hugg – drums, percussion, vibes
- Dave Richmond – bass on "Without You"

Production

- John Burgess – producer, mixing
- Norman Smith – engineer

== Release history ==
Date	Label	Format	Country	Catalog	Notes
17 September 1964	Ascot	LP	US	AM 13015	Original mono release.
17 September 1964	Ascot	LP	US	ALS 16015	Original stereo release.
1995	EMI Records USA	CD	US	E2-37067	Original CD release: double album stereo reissue with The Five Faces of Manfred Mann US version including three mono bonus tracks and one stereo bonus track.
22 January 2014	Parlophone	SHM-CD	US	WPCR-15451	Reissue of the Stereo album plus mono bonus tracks including one stereo remix bonus track.
4 November 2014	Sundazed	LP	US	LP 5451	Reissue of the original stereo release.

== See also ==
- Manfred Mann discography
