= Manfred Mann's Earth Band discography =

- Studio albums: 17
- Live albums: 3
- Compilation albums: 7
- Singles: 37
- Video albums: 5

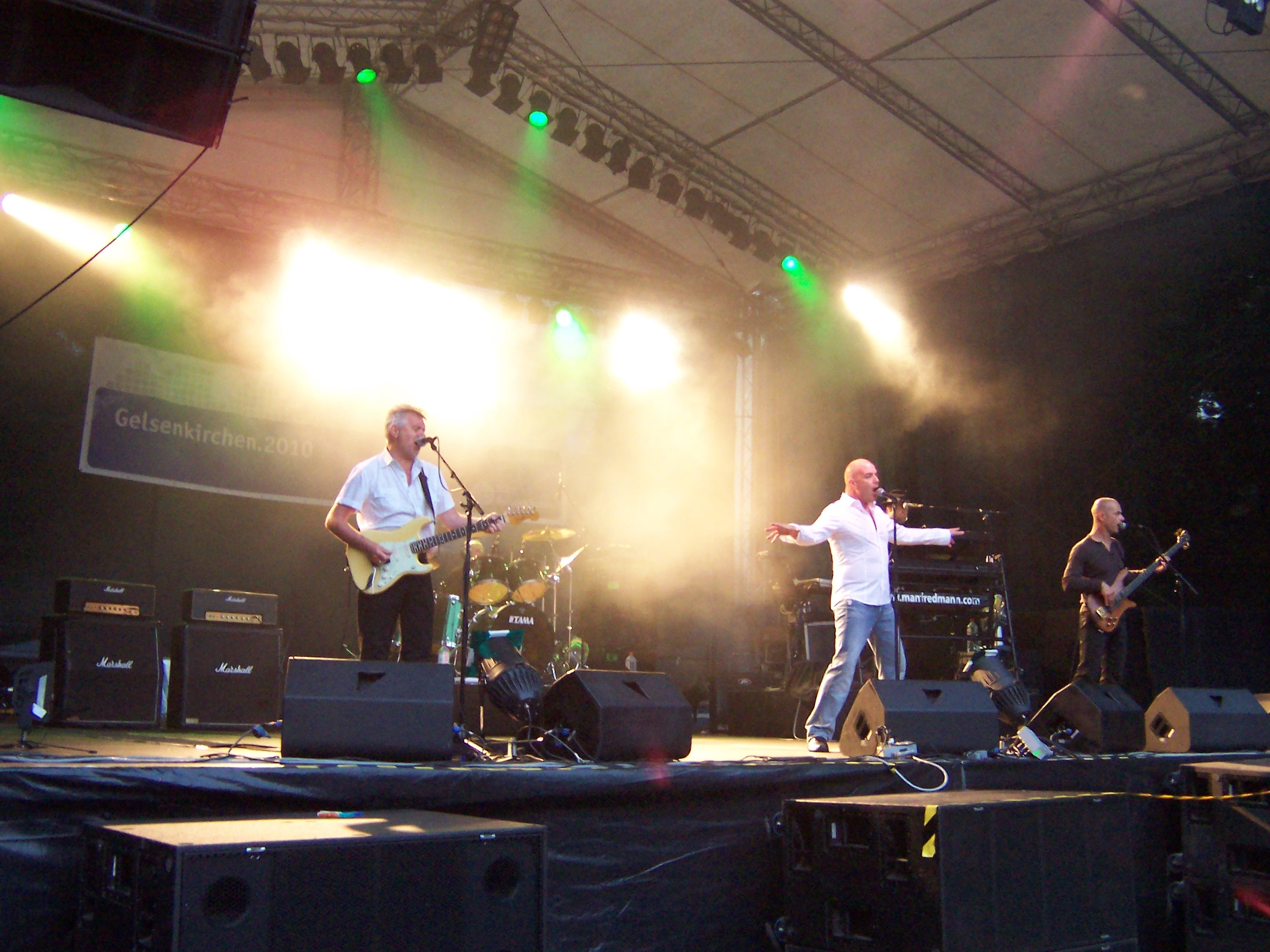
MMEB playing in Gelsenkirchen, Germany

The discography of British rock band Manfred Mann's Earth Band consists of 17 studio albums, 3 live albums, 7 compilation albums, 5 video albums, and 37 singles. Manfred Mann's Earth Band have been releasing albums and singles since 1971.

The Earth Band was formed in 1971 by South African musician Manfred Mann after the break-up of Chapter Three. Mann formed the Earth Band as a progressive rock group to break away from the pop genre.

The band's albums have charted in at least 8 countries and their singles have charted in at least 5. The group is most notable remembered for their cover versions of Bruce Springsteen songs, including "Blinded by the Light", which topped the singles charts in the United States and Canada. The group's albums have been the most successful in Norway, where a total of 7 released peaking in the top 10 of the VG-lista albums chart.

== Studio albums ==
Year	Title	Album details	Peak chart positions										Certification
Year	Title	Album details	UK	AUS	AUT	CAN	NL	NZ	NOR	SE	US	GER	Certification
1972	Manfred Mann's Earth Band	Released: 18 February 1972; Label: Philips (6308 086); Format: LP	—	—	—	—	—	—	—	—	138	—	Norway: Platinum
1972	Glorified Magnified	Released: 29 September 1972; Label: Philips (6308 125); Format: LP	—	—	—	—	—	—	—	—	—	—	
1973	Messin'	Released: 15 June 1973; Label: Vertigo (6360 087); Format: LP; US Release: Get Your Rocks Off	—	—	—	—	—	—	—	—	196	—	
1973	Solar Fire	Released: 30 November 1973; Label: Bronze (ILPS 9265); Format: LP	—	—	—	96	—	—	—	—	96	—	UK: Silver
1974	The Good Earth	Released: 11 October 1974; Label: Bronze (ILPS 9306); Format: LP	—	—	—	—	—	—	20	—	157	—	
1975	Nightingales & Bombers	Released: 22 August 1975; Label: Bronze (ILPS 9337); Format: LP	—	—	—	—	20	—	10	—	120	49	
1976	The Roaring Silence	Released: 27 August 1976; Label: Bronze (ILPS 9357); Format: LP	10	8	10	6	11	34	6	17	10	26	UK: Silver; US: Gold
1978	Watch	Released: 24 February 1978; Label: Bronze (BRON 507); Format: LP	33	40	14	85	18	29	2	9	83	3	GER: Platinum; NL: Gold
1979	Angel Station	Released: 9 March 1979; Label: Bronze (BRON 516); Format: LP	30	22	6	—	19	—	3	6	144	4	AUS: Gold; GER: Gold
1980	Chance	Released: 10 October 1980; Label: Bronze (BRON 529); Format: LP	—	42	12	23	—	—	6	13	87	11	
1982	Somewhere in Afrika	Released: October 1982 (Germany); 18 February 1983 (UK): Label: Bronze (BRON 543); Format: LP	87	—	—	—	—	—	8	14	40	8	
1986	Criminal Tango	Released: 13 June 1986; Label: Virgin (DIX/DIXCD 35); Format: LP/CD	—	—	26	—	—	—	7	18	—	17	
1987	Masque	Released: 16 October 1987; Label: Virgin (DIX/DIXCD 69); Format: LP/CD	—	—	—	—	—	—	—	—	—	44	
1991	Plains Music	Released: 17 August 1991; Label: Kaz (KAZ D902); Format: LP/CD	—	—	—	—	—	—	—	—	—	—	
1996	Soft Vengeance	Released: 3 June 1996; Label: Grapevine (GRACD213); Format: CD	—	—	—	—	—	—	22	—	—	65	
2004	2006	Released: 25 October 2004; Label: Cohesion (MANN 021); Format: CD	—	—	—	—	—	—	—	—	—	—	
"—" denotes releases that did not chart.

== Live albums ==
Year	Title	Album details
1984	Budapest Live	Released: 17 February 1984; Recorded: 6–7 April 1983; Label: Bronze (BRON/BRONC 550); Format: LP/Cassette
1998	Mann Alive	Released: May 1998; Label: Cohesion (MANNLIVE 1); Format: CD
2009	Bootleg Archives: Volumes 1–5	Released: October 2009; Label: Cohesion (MMARCHIVE1); Format: 5 CD Box
2017	Bootleg Archives: Volumes 6–10	Released: January 2017; Label: Cohesion (MMARCHIVE2); Format: 5 CD Box

== Compilation albums ==
Year	Title	Album details	Peak chart positions			
Year	Title	Album details	UK	NL	NO	GE
1975	1971-1973	Released: 1975; Label: Fontana (6438 085) / Vertigo (7299 584); Format: LP/CD	—	—	—	—
1990	20 Years of Manfred Mann's Earth Band	Released: 12 November 1990; Label: Cohesion (BOMME 1/BOMME CD 1); Format: LP/CD	—	—	17	—
1992	Spotlight: 1971–1991	Released: 1992; Label: Cohesion (COMME-CD13); Format: CD	—	—	—	—
1992	Blinded by the Light: The Very Best of Manfred Mann's Earth Band	Released: 1992; Label: Arcade (8800068); Format: CD	69	77	1	10
1993	The Very Best of Manfred Mann's Earth Band, Vol. 2	Released: 1993; Label: Arcade (8800182); Format: CD	—	—	—	—
1996	The Best of Manfred Mann's Earth Band	Released: 1996 (reissued 2007); Label: Warner Bros. Records (Warner Archives 9 46231-2); Format: CD, Cassette	—	—	—	—
1999	The Best of Manfred Mann's Earth Band Re-Mastered	Released: 4 October 1999; Label: Cohesion (MANN 018); Format: CD	—	—	—	82
2001	The Best of Manfred Mann's Earth Band Re-Mastered Volume II	Released: 2001; Label: Cohesion (MANN 020); Format: CD	—	—	—	—
2005	Odds & Sods – Mis-takes & Out-takes	Released: September 2005; Label: Cohesion (MMBOOK1); Format: CD	—	—	—	—

== Video albums ==
Year	Title	Album details
2004	Angel Station in Moscow	Released: 30. June 2004; Label: Cohesion (MANNDVD1); Format: DVD
2006	Unearthed: The Best of 1973–2005	Released: 11. December 2006; Label: Cohesion (MANNDVD2); Format: DVD
2007	Budapest Live	Released: September 2007; Label: Cohesion (MANNDVD3); Format: DVD
2008	Watch the DVD	Released: 03. November 2008; Label: Cohesion (MANNDVD4); Format: DVD
2009	Then And Now	Released: December 2009; Label: Cohesion (MANNDVD5); Format: DVD

== Singles ==
Year	Title	Peak chart positions									Certification	Album
Year	Title	UK	CA	GE	IRE	NL	NZ	SA	US	AU	Certification	Album
1971	"Living Without You"	—	—	—	—	—	—	—	69	—		Manfred Mann's Earth Band
1971	"Mrs. Henry"	—	—	—	—	—	—	—	108	—		Manfred Mann's Earth Band
1972	"I'm Up and I'm Leaving"	—	—	—	—	—	—	—	112	—		Manfred Mann's Earth Band
1972	"Meat"	—	—	—	—	—	—	—	—	—		Glorified Magnified
1973	"It's All Over Now, Baby Blue"	—	—	—	—	—	—	—	—	—		Glorified Magnified
1973	"Get Your Rocks Off"	—	—	—	—	—	—	—	—	—		Messin'
1973	"Mardi Gras Day"	—	—	—	—	—	—	—	—	—		Messin'
1973	"Joybringer"	9	—	—	20	—	10	—	—	93		Non-Album single
1974	"Father of Day, Father of Night"	—	—	—	—	—	—	—	—	—		Solar Fire
1974	"Be Not Too Hard"	—	—	—	—	—	—	—	—	—		The Good Earth
1975	"Spirit in the Night"	—	—	—	—	10	—	—	97	—		Nightingales & Bombers
1976	"Blinded by the Light"	6	1	—	—	19	8	—	1	11	UK: Silver; US: Gold	The Roaring Silence
1976	"Questions"	—	—	—	—	—	—	—	—	—		The Roaring Silence
1977	"Spirit in the Night" (New Version)	—	64	—	—	—	—	—	40	73		Non-album single
1977	"California"	54 (Note: Chart position is from the official UK "Breakers List".)	—	—	—	—	31	—	—	96		Watch
1978	"Mighty Quinn"	—	—	—	—	—	—	14	—	—		Watch
1978	"Davy's on the Road Again"	6	—	26	5	18	—	—	—	48		Watch
1979	"You Angel You"	54	93	—	—	—	—	—	58	50		Angel Station
1979	"Don't Kill It Carol"	45	—	23	29	—	—	—	—	—		Angel Station
1980	"Lies (Through the 80's)"	—	—	—	—	26	—	—	—	98		Chance
1981	"For You"	—	—	—	—	—	—	—	106	—		Chance
1981	"I (Who Have Nothing)"	—	—	48	—	—	—	—	—	—		Non-album single
1982	"Eyes of Nostradamus"	—	—	—	—	—	—	—	—	—		Somewhere in Afrika *No 2 on 1251am radio station for 1 week.Played in top 5 every night. Major radio station in Auckland
1982	"Redemption Song"	—	—	—	—	—	—	—	—	—		Somewhere in Afrika *No 2 on 1251am radio station for 1 week.Played in top 5 every night. Major radio station in Auckland
1982	"Tribal Statistics"	—	—	—	—	—	2*	—	—	—		Somewhere in Afrika *No 2 on 1251am radio station for 1 week.Played in top 5 every night. Major radio station in Auckland
1982	"Demolition Man"	—	—	—	—	—	—	—	—	—		Somewhere in Afrika *No 2 on 1251am radio station for 1 week.Played in top 5 every night. Major radio station in Auckland
1984	"Runner"	—	34	—	—	—	—	8	22	—		Somewhere in Afrika *No 2 on 1251am radio station for 1 week.Played in top 5 every night. Major radio station in Auckland
1986	"Do Anything You Wanna Do"	—	—	—	—	—	—	—	—	—		Criminal Tango
1986	"Going Underground"	—	—	—	—	—	—	—	—	—		Criminal Tango
1987	"Geronimo's Cadillac"	—	—	—	—	—	—	—	—	—		Masque
1992	"Blinded by the Light"	—	—	—	—	—	—	—	—	—		Blinded by the Light: The Very Best of Manfred Mann's Earth Band
1996	"Nothing Ever Happens"	—	—	97	—	—	—	—	—	—		Soft Vengeance
1996	"Tumbling Ball"	—	—	—	—	—	—	—	—	—		Soft Vengeance
1996	"Pleasure and Pain"	—	—	—	—	—	—	—	—	—		Soft Vengeance
1998	"Mighty Quinn"	—	—	—	—	—	—	—	—	—		Mann Alive
2004	"Demons and Dragons"	—	—	—	—	—	—	—	—	—		2006
2011	"(Lick Your) Boots"	—	—	—	—	—	—	—	—	—		Non-album single
"—" denotes releases that did not chart.

== See also ==
- Manfred Mann discography
