= Groovin' with Manfred Mann =

- cover photograph by Julian Hann

EP by Manfred Mann
- Released: 6 November 1964
- Recorded: 11, 22–23 June, 28 July 1964
- Studio: EMI Studios, London
- Genre: Rock and roll
- Label: His Master's Voice
- Producer: John Burgess

Manfred Mann chronology
The Five Faces of Manfred Mann (1964)	Groovin' with Manfred Mann (1964)	The One in the Middle (1965)

Manfred Mann EP chronology
Manfred Mann's Cock-a-Hoop (1964)	Groovin' with Manfred Mann (1964)	The One in the Middle (1965)

Singles from Groovin' With Manfred Mann
- 1. "Do Wah Diddy Diddy" Released: 10 July 1964

Groovin' with Manfred Mann is an EP by Manfred Mann, released in 1964. The EP is a 7-inch vinyl record and released in mono with the catalogue number His Master's Voice 7EG 8876.

== Personnel ==
- Manfred Mann - keyboards
- Mike Vickers - guitar, alto saxophone, flute
- Tom McGuinness - bass guitar
- Mike Hugg - drums and vibes
- Paul Jones - lead vocals, harmonica

== Track listing ==
Side 1

1. "Groovin'" (Ben E. King, James Bethea)
2. "Do Wah Diddy Diddy" (Jeff Barry, Ellie Greenwich)

Side 2

1. "Can't Believe It" (Paul Jones)
2. "Did You Have To Do That" (Paul Jones)

== Recording dates ==
- "Groovin" – 23 June
- "Do Wah Diddy Diddy" – 11 & 22 June
- "Can't Believe It" – 23 June
- "Did You Have To Do That" – 28 July
