= The Five Faces of Manfred Mann =

1964 studio album by Manfred Mann

The Five Faces of Manfred Mann (UK)

Studio album by Manfred Mann
- Released: 11 September 1964
- Recorded: 17 December 1963 – 5 June 1964
- Studios: EMI Studios, London
- Genre: R&B
- Label: His Master's Voice
- Producer: John Burgess

Manfred Mann chronology
Manfred Mann's Cock-a-Hoop (1964)	The Five Faces of Manfred Mann (UK) (1964)	Groovin' with Manfred Mann (1964)

Manfred Mann album chronology
The Five Faces of Manfred Mann (1964)	Mann Made (1965)

Professional ratings
Review scores
Source	Rating
AllMusic	4/5 stars
Uncut	3/5 stars

The Five Faces of Manfred Mann is the debut British and second American studio album by Manfred Mann. It was first released in the United Kingdom on 11 September 1964 by His Master's Voice. In late October/early November, the album was released in Canada by Capitol Records. The Canadian track listing was almost the same as the UK version, except it included the hit "Do Wah Diddy Diddy" instead of "I've Got My Mojo Working". The record has been called "one of the great blues-based British Invasion albums; it's a hot, rocking record that benefits from some virtuoso playing as well".

== Background ==
The songs on the original version of the Five Faces of Manfred Mann are R&B, including the band's cover versions of Howlin' Wolf's "Smokestack Lightning", Muddy Waters' "Got My Mojo Working", and Bo Diddley's "Bring It to Jerome", as well as a few of the group's own jazzy compositions. Particularly noticeable in the instrumental sections are Manfred Mann's keyboard work, Mike Vickers' flute and saxophone work, and Mike Hugg's vibes. The album includes the Cannonball Adderley song "Sack O' Woe" from the R&B-influenced school of early 1960s jazz.

Bruce Eder of AllMusic writes:

The debut album by Manfred Mann holds up even better 40 years on than it did in 1964. It's also one of the longest LPs of its era, clocking in at 39 minutes, and there's not a wasted note or a song extended too far among its 14 tracks.

== Reception ==
In his retrospective review of the US release, critic Bruce Eder wrote, "The band's second American LP (which shares its title with their first British album) was slightly less impressive than their first, but was still a respectable mix of R&B and pop. For pop, there were 'Sha La La' and 'Come Tomorrow,' two of their biggest mid-'60s hits, and 'She,' one of their best self-penned efforts in that vein. For R&B, there was the original 'Hubble Bubble (Toil and Trouble),' a British hit, and some good covers, notably 'I'm Your Kingpin,' 'Groovin',' and 'Dashing Away with the Smoothing Iron,' drawn from a then-recent British EP release."

== Track listing ==
=== Side one ===
1. "Smokestack Lightning" (Chester Burnett) – 2:30
2. "Don't Ask Me What I Say" (Paul Jones) – 3:09
3. "Sack O' Woe" (Cannonball Adderley) – 3:31
4. "What You Gonna Do?" (Jones, Manfred Mann) – 3:03
5. "I'm Your Hoochie Coochie Man" (Willie Dixon) – 2:10
6. "I'm Your Kingpin" (Mann, Jones) – 2:38
7. "Down the Road Apiece" (Don Raye) – 3:16

=== Side two ===
1. "Got My Mojo Working" (Preston Foster; credited to Muddy Waters) – 2:43
  - Canadian version: "Do Wah Diddy Diddy" (Jeff Barry, Ellie Greenwich) – 2:23
2. "It's Gonna Work Out Fine" (Rose Marie McCoy, Sylvia McKinney; credited to Joe Seneca, J. Lee) – 2:33
3. "Mr. Anello" (Mike Hugg, Jones, Mann, Tom McGuinness, Mike Vickers) – 2:15
4. "Untie Me" (Joe South) – 3:41
5. "Bring It to Jerome" (Jerome Green) – 3:31
6. "Without You" (Jones) – 2:25
7. "You've Got to Take It" (Jones) – 2:00

== US version ==
The Five Faces of Manfred Mann (US)

Studio album by Manfred Mann
- Released: 8 February 1965
- Recorded: 5 February–26 November 1964
- Studios: EMI Studios, London
- Genres: Rhythm and blues; pop; jazz
- Label: Ascot
- Producer: John Burgess

Manfred Mann US chronology
The Manfred Mann Album (1964)	The Five Faces of Manfred Mann (US) (1965)	My Little Red Book of Winners (1965)

Singles from The Five Faces of Manfred Mann (US)
- 1. "Hubble Bubble (Toil And Trouble)" Released: 14 May 1964; 2. "Sha La La" Released: November 1964; 3. "Come Tomorrow" Released: 7 January 1965

The American version of the album (their second U.S. release following The Manfred Mann Album) was released on 8 February 1965 by Ascot Records (a subsidiary of United Artists) with a very different track listing. This version is more pop-oriented than its predecessor, The Manfred Mann Album, as it features "Sha La La", "Come Tomorrow", and "Hubble Bubble (Toil and Trouble)"; as well as compositions made by lead singer Paul Jones and the traditional American folk number "John Hardy". It also features a smaller section of the band's R&B and jazz influences. It is essentially a whole different album, sharing only two songs with the UK release ("I'm Your Kingpin" and "You've Got to Take It"): the majority of the album already appeared on The Manfred Mann Album.

=== Side one ===
According to the Sundazed reissue:

1. "Sha La La" (Robert Mosley, Robert Napoleon Taylor) – 2:30
2. "Come Tomorrow" (Bob Elgin, Frank Augustus, Dolores Phillips) – 2:13
3. "She" (Jones) – 2:10
4. "Can't Believe It" (Jones) – 3:19
5. "John Hardy" (Traditional) – 2:01
6. "Did You Have to Do That" (Jones) – 3:29

=== Side two ===
1. "Watermelon Man" (Herbie Hancock) – 2:12
2. "I'm Your Kingpin" (Jones, Mann) – 2:38
3. "Hubble Bubble (Toil and Trouble)" (Mann, Hugg, Vickers, Jones, McGuinness) – 2:25
4. "You've Got to Take It" (Jones) – 2:00
5. "Groovin' " (Ben E. King, James Bethea) – 3:40
6. "Dashing Away with the Smoothing Iron" (Mann, Hugg, Vickers, Jones, McGuinness) – 1:59

== Personnel ==
Manfred Mann

- Manfred Mann – keyboards, backing vocals
- Paul Jones – lead vocals, harmonica
- Mike Vickers – guitars, saxes, flutes, backing vocals
- Tom McGuinness – bass, backing vocals
- Mike Hugg – drums, percussion, vibes
- Dave Richmond – bass on "Without You"

Production

- John Burgess – producer, mixing
- Norman Smith – engineer

== Charts ==
The Five Faces of Manfred Mann peaked at number 3 on the UK Albums Chart and is the band's highest-charting release on that chart. The U.S. version also charted on the Billboard 200, spending four weeks on the chart and peaking at number 141 on 20 March 1965.

== Release history ==
Region	Date	Label	Format	Catalog
United Kingdom	11 September 1964	His Master's Voice	mono LP	CLP 1731
Canada	October 1964	Capitol Records	mono LP	T-6093
United States	February 1965	Ascot Records	mono LP	ALM 13018
United States	February 1965	Ascot Records	stereo LP	ALS 16018
Canada	circa 1966	Capitol Records	duophonic LP	DT-6093
