= Hubble Bubble (Toil and Trouble) =

- Norwegian single sleeve

Single by Manfred Mann
- B-side: "I'm Your Kingpin"
- Released: 10 April 1964
- Recorded: 2 March 1964
- Studio: EMI, London
- Genre: Rhythm and blues
- Length: 2:27
- Label: His Master's Voice
- Songwriters: Mike Hugg; Paul Jones; Manfred Mann; Tom McGuinness; Mike Vickers
- Producer: John Burgess

Manfred Mann UK singles chronology
"5-4-3-2-1" (1964)	"Hubble Bubble (Toil and Trouble)" (1964)	"Do Wah Diddy Diddy" (1964)

Audio
- "Hubble Bubble (Toil and Trouble)" on YouTube

"Hubble Bubble (Toil and Trouble)" is a song written and recorded by British pop group Manfred Mann. Composed as a follow-up to their hit single "5-4-3-2-1", "Hubble Bubble (Toil and Trouble)" was written on the M1 or A1 road while travelling, and its' title was derived from William Shakespeare's Macbeth. Musically, it is a busy rhythm and blues song which features a harmonica performance by lead vocalist Paul Jones. It was recorded on 2 March 1964 at EMI Studios in London with John Burgess producing. It was the first single by the band to featured Tom McGuinness on bass.

With the group composition "I'm Your Kingpin" on its' B-side, "Hubble Bubble (Toil and Trouble)" was released as a single by His Master's Voice in the UK on 10 April 1964. The single peaked at number 11 on the Record Retailer singles chart, despite promotion by the band on various television shows. A commercial US release on Ascot Records was cancelled, and it first appeared there on their second US album The Five Faces of Manfred Mann in February 1965. Upon release, critics noted it to be structurally similar to "5-4-3-2-1". Retrospectively, Paul Jones' performance has been praised, and it has been covered by The Smashing Pumpkins.

== Composition and recording ==
As with Manfred Mann's three prior single A-sides in the UK, "Hubble Bubble (Toil and Trouble)" was written by members of the group. The band's bass guitarist Tom McGuinness believed that writing a follow-up to a hit single "would be easy". It was a collaborative effort by all five of Manfred Mann's members; Mike Hugg, Paul Jones, Manfred Mann, McGuiness and Mike Vickers. According to Mann, the majority of the song was written whilst the band were in transit on "on the M1 or A1", and that it took "so long to write a song that we all agree on that we didn't do the whole thing on that journey". The phrase itself was derived from "double, double toil and trouble", which itself stemmed from the "Song of the Witches" from William Shakespeare's Macbeth. This was commented on in a contemporary article by Disc, who added that they got the "cauldron localization slightly mixed up.

Musically, "Hubble Bubble (Toil and Trouble)" was according to band biographer Greg Russo a "frenetically paced" song. AllMusic reviewer Bruce Eder classifies it as R&B, as did that site's Matthew Greenwald, who argued it was a "tough, up-tempo R&B; romp" that featured "some unusual and literate lyrics" and "blues harp" performed by vocalist Paul Jones. Alexis Petridis of The Guardian further opined that it was "raw slice of garage R&B". "Hubble Bubble (Toil and Trouble)" was the only song recorded at a recording session held at EMI Studios in London on 2 March 1964. The master take of the single was a splice between takes ten and 12. As with the remainder of their output for EMI, the single was produced by John Burgess and engineered by Norman Smith. Although he had played on a few tracks that would later appear on Manfred Mann's debut album The Five Faces of Manfred Mann (1964), "Hubble Bubble (Toil and Trouble)" was the first Manfred Mann single on which McGuinness played bass. (Note: The bass on their previous single "5-4-3-2-1" was recorded by Dave Richmond almost immediately before he left the group.)

== Release and commercial performance ==
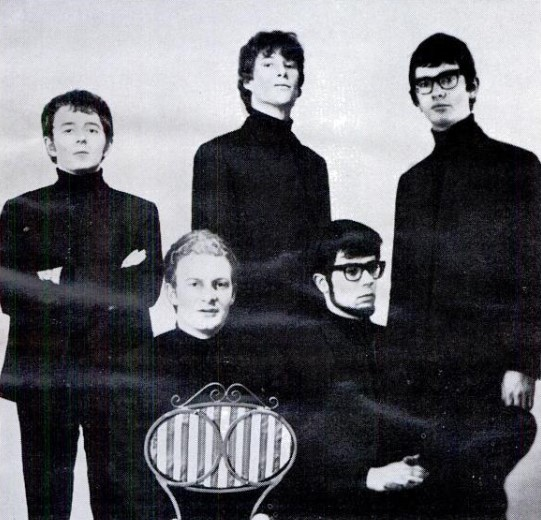
The relative chart failure of "Hubble Bubble (Toil and Trouble)" led to Manfred Mann releasing outside songs as their future A-sides.

"Hubble Bubble (Toil and Trouble)" was initially released as Manfred Mann's fourth UK single through the EMI sublabel His Master's Voice on 10 April 1964. (Note: Catalogue number HMV POP 1282.) The B-side of the single was "I'm Your Kingpin", a collaborative composition by Mann and Jones "that perfectly illustrated how adept Manfred Mann was at fusing jazz and R&B elements". "Hubble Bubble (Toil and Trouble)" was slated to appear on Ascot Records as Manfred Mann's first single on that label in the US on 14 May 1964, however, only promotional copies of the single were ever released. (Note: Catalogue number Ascot AS 2151.) In the UK, Manfred Mann promoted the single's release with appearances on television shows such as Ready Steady Go! (3 April), Thank Your Lucky Stars (11 April), and Top of the Pops (22 and 29 April).

On the Record Retailer singles chart, "Hubble Bubble (Toil and Trouble)" entered at number 29 on 22 April 1964, before reaching a peak of number 11 on 6 May 1964. It dropped out of the charts at number 50 on 10 June, having spent a total of eight weeks on the chart. Comparatively, their previous single "5-4-3-2-1" had spent 13 weeks on the chart and peaked in the top-five. As a result of this perceived chart failure, producer John Burgess insisted that the band recorded outside material for single A-sides, holding onto the "accepted wisdom of the day"; that "groups don't write their own material". (Note: The follow up single to "Hubble Bubble (Toil and Trouble)", a cover of The Exciters' "Do Wah Diddy Diddy" (1964), reached number one in both the UK and US.) Manfred Mann also performed the song and "Sticks and Stones" at the New Musical Express Pollwinners' Concert on 26 April 1964, and it would go on to appear as an album track on their second US album The Five Faces of Manfred Mann, which Ascot released on 8 February 1965. (Note: Catalogue number Ascot ALM 13018 (mono) and ALS 16018 (stereo).)

== Reception and legacy ==
Writing for Disc, Don Nicholl believed that "Hubble Bubble (Toil and Trouble)" was moving at a "lick" which would "please all the new fans" of Manfred Mann, and would also "satisfy early followers". Nicholl opined that the track was "always exciting", both instrumentally and vocally, praising the harmonica performance as "shining through". Pop Weekly's Peter Aldersley believed the single was a "powerful, fast moving elixir" and compared it to "5-4-3-2-1", though did not feel it was as "clean-cut or definitive" despite being "lively". The disc jury for Record Mirror similarly felt that "Hubble Bubble (Toil and Trouble)" was in the same vein as "5-4-3-2-1", though argued that it was "slightly better". They noted the song to have a "bluesy quality", and opined that Paul Jones' vocal performance was "frantic" and "driving", something that the rest of the band "supported well" in the backing.

Retrospectively, Matthew Greenwald praised Paul Jones' performance on the track, stating that he "really shines on the lyrics, blues harp, and vocals here". Alexis Petridis described the track as "fabulous". Opinion by the band members were mixed; at the time of release, they preferred the B-side "I'm Your Kingpin. Retrospectively, the band have distanced themselves from the track, and have cited it as their least favorite A-side release, owing to its' "busy arrangement". Their reunion band The Manfreds has additionally also opted to not covering it live. It has since been covered by multiple artists, including the Smashing Pumpkins, who incorporated it into their setlist in 2023. Stefan Stevenson of the Fort Worth Star-Telegram singled the cover out as "weird", partly because it was a "seemingly random selection" to cover, and because the Smashing Pumpkins "turned it into a six-minute showcase of moody guitar licks".

== Charts ==
Weekly chart performance for "Hubble Bubble (Toil and Trouble)"
Chart (1964)	Peak position
UK (Disc Top 30)	13
UK (Melody Maker Top 50)	14
UK (New Musical Express Top 30)	11
UK (Record Retailer Top 50)	11
