= Oh No Not My Baby =

1964 single by Maxine Brown

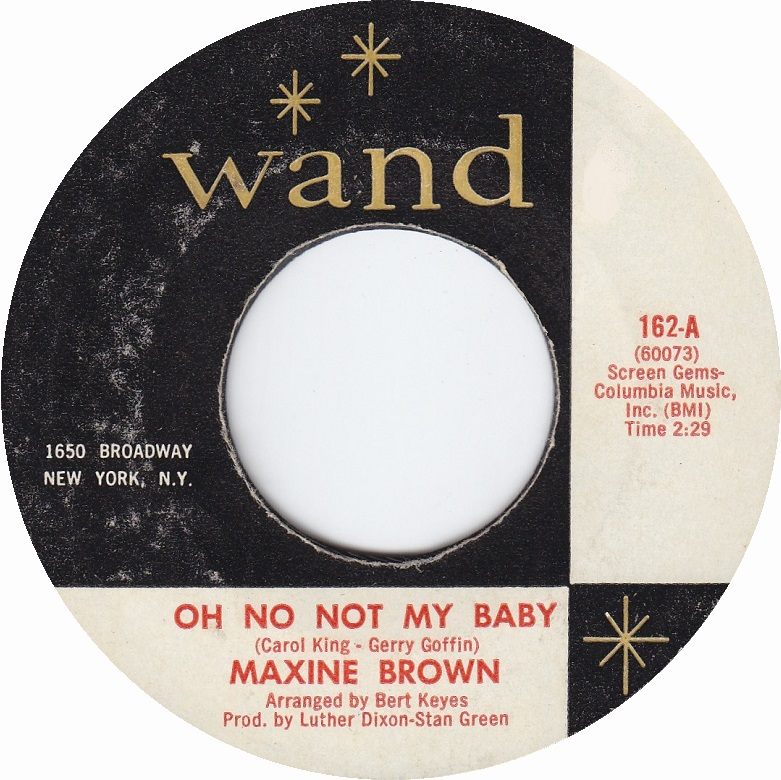

Single by Maxine Brown

from the album Spotlight on Maxine Brown
- B-side: "You Upset My Soul"
- Released: September 1964
- Studio: Bell Sound (New York City)
- Genre: R&B
- Length: 2:36
- Label: Wand
- Songwriters: Gerry Goffin; Carole King
- Producers: Luther Dixon; Stan Greenberg

Maxine Brown singles chronology
"Coming Back to You" (1964)	"Oh No Not My Baby" (1964)	"It's Gonna Be Alright" (1965)

"Oh No Not My Baby" is a song written by Gerry Goffin and Carole King. The song's lyrics describe how friends and family repeatedly warn the singer about a partner's infidelities. The song is regarded as an American standard due to its long-time popularity with both music listeners and recording artists.

== History ==
The first released version of "Oh No Not My Baby" was by Maxine Brown, according to whom the song had first been recorded by her Scepter Records' roster-mates the Shirelles with the group's members alternating leads, an approach which had rendered the song unreleasable.

Brown says that Scepter exec Stan Greenberg gave her the song with the advisement that she had to "find the original melody" from the recording by the Shirelles: "they [had gone] so far off by each [group member] taking their own lead, no one knew any more where the real melody stood."

Brown recalls sitting on the porch of her one-level house in Queens listening to the Shirelles' track play through her open window. A group of children skipping rope on the sidewalk picked up the song's main hook before Brown, hearing the children singing "Oh no not my baby" as they skipped, gave Brown the idea for the song's melody. Brown recorded her vocal over the Shirelles' track with the group's vocals erased; Dee Dee Warwick provided the harmony vocal on the chorus.

Released in September 1964, Brown's "Oh No Not My Baby" spent seven weeks in the Top 40 of the Billboard Hot 100 in December 1964 - January 1965 with a #24 peak. The song was included on her second studio album Spotlight on Maxine Brown, released in 1965. In Canada the song was #32 for 2 weeks.

== Manfred Mann version ==
"Oh No Not My Baby"
- Danish single sleeve

Single by Manfred Mann

from the album My Little Red Book of Winners
- B-side: "What Am I Doing Wrong?"
- Released: April 9, 1965
- Recorded: March 12, 16 & 17, 1965
- Studio: EMI (London)
- Genre: Pop rock; R&B
- Length: 2:22
- Label: His Master's Voice
- Songwriters: Gerry Goffin; Carole King
- Producer: John Burgess

Manfred Mann UK singles chronology
"Come Tomorrow" (1965)	"Oh No Not My Baby" (1965)	"If You Gotta Go, Go Now" (1965)

Audio
- "Oh No Not My Baby" on YouTube

=== Background and recording ===
In 1965, British pop group Manfred Mann recorded "Oh No Not My Baby" as their eight single. As with the band's two previous singles, "Sha La La" (1964) and "Come Tomorrow" (1965), their cover of "Oh No Not My Baby" was "culled" from lead vocalist Paul Jones' record collection, who owned a copy of the Maxine Brown single. According to Matthew Greenwald of AllMusic, the Manfred Mann rendition of "Oh No Not My Baby" is an extremely accessible pop rock tune over a "vaguely R&B-inspired melody" that featured a "simple yet powerful arrangement".

Manfred Mann's recording saw the band experimenting with various instruments; drummer Mike Hugg is featured overdubbing a performance on the vibraphone. As such, Manfred Mann recorded both "Oh Not Not My Baby" and the EP track "What Am I To Do" over three different sessions at EMI Studios on March 12, 16 and 17, 1965. As with the rest of the band's output on His Master's Voice, the song was produced by John Burgess and engineered by Norman Smith.

=== Release and reception ===
His Master's Voice released "Oh No Not My Baby" as a single in the UK on April 9, 1965. The B-side was Mike Hugg's composition "What Am I Doing Wrong?", a "breezy jazzy blues combination" with an "unusual fade-in". In the US, Ascot Records opted to not release the song as a single, despite Matthew Greenwald feeling that it "no doubt have been received with open arms in America". Instead, Ascot planned to release "I Can't Believe What You Say" in its' place on April 21, 1965. However, this release was cancelled in favor for the single "My Little Red Book" on May 26, 1965. In the UK, "Oh No Not My Baby" reached number 11 on the Record Retailer chart, but peaked in the top-ten on the national charts published by Disc Weekly, Melody Maker, and the New Musical Express.

The single received positive reviews in the British music press upon release. Writing for Disc Weekly, Penny Valentine believed it contained "the most insistent hit-sound they have ever made" in which a lot of "thought had gone into the arrangement". She praised Jones' vocal performance, opining it to be a "super performance all round" and a "definitive chart topper". In the New Musical Express, critic Derek Johnson felt that Manfred Mann's version of the song was more commercial than Maxine Brown's recording, and felt it was "faster and more spirited" than their previous single "Come Tomorrow". He noted it as "wistful, but very catchy" and insisted that it would "do very well".

As it peaked outside the top-ten on the Record Retailer chart in the UK, Matthew Greenwald referred to it as "one of the band's great near misses". Similarly, he felt that "Oh No Not My Baby" and their cover of Bob Dylan's "With God on Our Side" demonstrated how "the band could capture any style and make it their own". Bruce Eder of AllMusic opined that the song had one of Paul Jones' "greatest R&B-style performances". In the US, "Oh No Not My Baby" first received release on their studio album My Little Red Book of Winners, released on September 15, 1965. Additionally, Manfred Mann recorded a version of the song for BBC Radio broadcast.

=== Charts ===
Chart (1965)	Peak position
Australia (Kent Music Report)	67
Finland (Mitä Suomi Soittaa?)	24
South Africa (Springbok Radio)	19
UK (Disc Weekly Top 30)	9
UK (Melody Maker Pop 50)	9
UK (New Musical Express Top 30)	9
UK (Record Retailer Top 50)	11

== Rod Stewart version ==
In 1973 Rod Stewart (backed by his Faces bandmates Ron Wood, Kenney Jones and Ian McLagan) charted with "Oh! No Not My Baby"; his self-produced version — a single with no parent album — reached #6 UK in September 1973 subsequently reaching #59 on the U.S. charts, and #51 on the Canadian charts before the year's end. Record World said that it "has the right combination that makes for hit records."

The B-side, credited on the single to Faces, was "Jodie" written by Ron Wood, Rod Stewart, and Ian McLagan.

== Cher version ==
"Oh No Not My Baby"

Single by Cher

from the album Greatest Hits: 1965–1992
- B-side: "Love Hurts"
- Released: November 2, 1992
- Length: 3:12
- Label: Geffen
- Songwriters: Gerry Goffin; Carole King
- Producer: Peter Asher

Cher singles chronology
"Could've Been You" (1992)	"Oh No Not My Baby" (1992)	"Whenever You're Near" (1992)

American singer and actress Cher released her cover version of "Oh No Not My Baby" as the first single from her first comprehensive compilation album, Greatest Hits: 1965–1992. The song was produced by Peter Asher and released by Geffen Records in November 1992. It became a moderate international hit early in 1993. AllMusic editor J. F. Promis called her cover "gutsy."

=== Track listings ===
- European 7-inch and cassette single
1. "Oh No Not My Baby" – 3:09
2. "Love Hurts" – 4:19
- European 12-inch and CD single
1. "Oh No Not My Baby" – 3:09
2. "Love on a Rooftop" – 4:22
3. "Love Hurts" – 4:19
4. "Main Man" – 3:48

=== Charts ===
Chart (1992–1993)	Peak position
Australia (ARIA)	188
Austria (Ö3 Austria Top 40)	30
Europe (Eurochart Hot 100)	87
Europe (European AC Radio)	4
Europe (European Hit Radio)	14
Germany (GfK)	52
Iceland (Íslenski Listinn Topp 40)	28
Spain Radio (AFYVE)	35
Switzerland (Schweizer Hitparade)	19
UK Singles (Official Charts)	33
UK Airplay (Music Week)	6

=== Release history ===
Region	Date	Format(s)	Label(s)	Ref.
United Kingdom	November 2, 1992	7-inch vinyl; CD; cassette	Geffen	
Australia	December 14, 1992	CD; cassette	Geffen	

== Other cover versions ==
- Dusty Springfield recorded it for her 2nd album Ev'rything's Coming Up Dusty in 1965
- Aretha Franklin recorded a rendition of “Oh No, Not My Baby” for her 1970 record Spirit in The Dark with the Muscle Shoals Rhythm Section.
- Merry Clayton recorded "Oh No Not My Baby" in a 1972 version which featured co-writer Carole King on piano; produced by Lou Adler, this single reached the Billboard Hot 100 at #72 (#61 on Cash Box Top 100 Singles chart) and the Billboard's Bestselling Soul Singles chart at #30. Despite its mild chart impact, Clayton's track earned a nomination for the Grammy Award for Best Female R&B Vocal Performance for the year 1972.
- De Blanc had a minor R&B hit (#70) with "Oh No Not My Baby" in 1976.
- Linda Ronstadt recorded "Oh No Not My Baby" for her 1993 Winter Light album; the track reached #35 on Billboard's radio airplay only Hot Adult Contemporary Tracks in 1994. In Canada, the song reached #33 in the Top 100 and #29 on AC charts.
- Television band The Partridge Family recorded "Oh No Not My Baby" for their 1973 album Bulletin Board. It was performed in episode 6 of season 4, "Double Trouble".
- Freddie McGregor recorded a reggae version for his first album "Freddy" / "Mr. McGregor" in 1979.

== Samples ==
- The introductory riff to Maxine Brown's version was utilised by Gabriella Cilmi on her single "Sanctuary".
