= Machines (EP) =

EP by Manfred Mann
- Released: 7 April 1966
- Recorded: 15 December 1965 – 9 February 1966
- Genre: Rock and roll
- Language: English
- Label: His Master's Voice
- Producer: John Burgess

Manfred Mann chronology
No Living Without Loving (1965)	Machines (1966)	Instrumental Asylum (1966)

Machines is an EP by Manfred Mann, released in 1966. The EP is a 7-inch vinyl record and released in mono with the catalogue number His Master's Voice 7EG 8942. The record was the number 1 EP in the UK number-one EP for 1 week, starting 28 May 1966.

== Track listing ==
Side 1

1. "Machines" (Mort Shuman)
2. "She Needs Company" (Paul Jones)

Side 2

1. "Tennessee Waltz" (Redd Stewart)
2. "When Will I Be Loved" (Phil Everly)

== Background ==
For this EP, Manfred Mann's third and last number 1 EP, they chose several non R & B songs to cover including Tennessee Waltz, the best-known version being by Patti Page and The Everly Brothers When Will I be Loved. Jack Bruce is the bassist on these tracks.

== Chart performance ==
The record reached the Number 1 spot on the UK's EP charts on May 28, 1966.
