= No Living Without Loving =

EP by Manfred Mann
- Released: 19 November 1965
- Recorded: 2 August, 13 & 30 September 1965
- Studio: EMI Studios, London
- Genre: Rock and roll
- Language: English
- Label: His Master's Voice
- Producer: John Burgess

Manfred Mann chronology
Mann Made (1965)	No Living Without Loving (1965)	Machines (1966)

Manfred Mann EP chronology
The One in the Middle (1965)	No Living Without Loving (1965)	Machines (1966)

No Living Without Loving is an EP by Manfred Mann, released in November 1965. The EP is a 7-inch vinyl record and released in mono with the catalogue number His Master's Voice 7EG 8922.

The cover photo was taken by Bill Francis and the liner notes were written by Tom McGuiness.

== Track listing ==
Side one

1. "There's No Living Without Your Loving" (Paul Kaufman, Jerry Harris)

Vocal: Paul Jones with the Three Bells, with Orchestra arranged and conducted by Mike Vickers

1. "Let's Go Get Stoned" (Nickolas Ashford, Valerie Simpson, Jo Armstead)

Side two

1. "Tired of Trying, Bored with Lying, Scared of Dying" (Paul Jones)
2. "I Put A Spell On You" (Screamin' Jay Hawkins, Herb Slotkin)

== Chart performance ==
The record was the number 1 EP in the UK number-one EP for 7 weeks from December 18, 1965 until it was replaced by The Beatles' The Beatles' Million Sellers on February 5, 1966.
