= Marie Knight =

American musician

- Knight in 1949

Background information
- Born: Marie Roach; June 1, 1920; Sanford, Florida, U.S. or Attapulgus, Georgia, U.S.
- Died: August 30, 2009 (aged 89) Harlem, New York City, U.S.
- Genres: Gospel, R&B
- Occupation: Singer
- Instrument: Vocals
- Years active: c. 1945–2009
- Labels: Various, including Decca, Okeh

Marie Knight (née Roach; June 1, 1920 – August 30, 2009) was an American gospel and rhythm and blues (R&B) singer.

== Personal life ==
She was born Marie Roach' in 1920, though she claimed to have been born in 1925. Sources differ as to her place of birth – either Attapulgus, Georgia, or Sanford, Florida – but she grew up in Newark, New Jersey. Her father was a construction worker and her family were members of the Church of God in Christ. She first toured as a singer in 1939 with Frances Robinson, an evangelist. She married preacher Albert Knight in 1941, but the union ended in divorce. While she was touring with Sister Rosetta in the 1940s, her two children died in a fire at her mother's house in New Jersey. Knight died in Harlem of complications from pneumonia, on August 30, 2009, aged 89. She was survived by a sister, Bernice Henry.

== Musical career ==
In 1946, Knight made her first recordings, for Haven Records, with the masters soon purchased by Signature Records, as a member of the Sunset Four (or the Sunset Jubilee Singers). Shortly afterwards, Sister Rosetta Tharpe saw her singing at the Golden Gate Auditorium in Harlem, on a bill with Mahalia Jackson, and invited Knight to join her on tour. Tharpe recognized "something special" in Marie's contralto voice.

She continued to record and perform with Tharpe through the 1940s, sometimes acting out the parts of "the Saint and the Sinner", with Tharpe as the saint and Knight as the sinner. Among their successes were the songs "Beams of Heaven", "Didn't It Rain", and "Up Above My Head", recorded for Decca Records. "Up Above My Head", credited jointly to both singers, reached number six on the US R&B chart at the end of 1948, and Knight's solo version of "Gospel Train" reached number nine on the R&B chart in 1949.

She left Tharpe to go solo around 1951, and put together a backing group, the Millionaires (Thomasina Stewart, Eleonore King and Roberta Jones), with whom she recorded the 1956 album Songs of the Gospel. She began recording secular R&B music in the late 1950s, for various labels, including Decca, Mercury, and Okeh. Her duet with Rex Garvin, credited as Marie and Rex, "I Can't Sit Down" released on the Carlton label, reached number 94 on the pop chart in 1959. In the late 1950s, she also toured Britain as a guest of Humphrey Lyttelton.

In 1961, she recorded the single "Come Tomorrow", which was later a hit for Manfred Mann. Knight's version of "Cry Me a River" reached number 35 on the U.S. Billboard R&B charts in 1965.

She toured with Brook Benton, the Drifters, and Clyde McPhatter, and regularly reunited onstage with Tharpe. She remained friends with Tharpe, and helped arrange her funeral in 1973. In 1975, having given up performing secular music, she recorded another gospel album, Marie Knight: Today. In 2002, Knight made a comeback in the gospel world, recording for a tribute album to Tharpe. She released a full-length album, Let Us Get Together, on her manager's label in 2007.

== Discography ==
=== As a solo artist ===
Year	Song	Publisher & Number
1946	Just a closer walk with thee / The land beyond the river (as Sister Marie Knight)	Signature 32008
1946	When I get to the end of my journey / What could I do (as Sister Marie Knight)	Signature 32009
1947	Just a closer walk with Thee / The land beyond the river	Haven 516
1947	The end of my journey / What could I do	Haven 517
ca. 1947	Misery blues	RCA Victor 22-0073
ca. 1947	Rock with it	RCA Victor 22-0073
1949	I'll let nothing separate me... / Where could I go bu to the Lord (as Sister Marie Knight)	Candy 4001
1949	I'll never turn back no more / The Lord will make a way	Candy 4002
1949	Today / Something within me banishes pain	Candy 4003
1949	Just a closer walk with Thee / The land beyond the river	Candy 4004
1949	The end of my journey / What could I do	Candy 4010
1950	Jesus loves me / Whispering hope	Decca 48128
1951	I heard my mother pray / Don't miss that train	Decca 48198
1951	Satisfied with Jesus / The old rugged cross	Decca 48219
1951	Every day every hour / My expectations	Decca 48233
1951	On the battlefield / I'll fly away	Decca 48253
1951	Adeste fideles (O, come all ye faithful) / It came upon the midnight clear	Decca 48262
1952	Sit down servant / Does Jesus care	Decca 48285
1953	Jesus walk with me / Get away Jordan	Decca 28545
1953	I just can't keep from cryin' / On my appointed time	Decca 48298
1953	Let go his hand / Let's go on	Decca 48301
1954	Calvary / God spoke to me	Decca 48308
1954	This old soul of mine / I tell it wherever I go	Decca 48320
1954	I'm troubled / Stop now, it's praying time	Decca 48326
1954	Trouble in mind / What more can I do	Decca 48327
1955	Who rolled the stone away / Easter bells	Decca 48333
1955	The battle of Jericho / A traveler's tune	Decca 48334
1955	I must tell Jesus / The storm is passing over	Decca 48336
1956	Stand by me / Blessed be the Lord	Mercury 70904
1956	Grasshopper baby / Look at me	Mercury 70969
1960	Hope you won't hold it against me / To be loved by you	Addit 1016
1960	Sylvia / Come tomorrow	CDKEND 212 (2002)
1961	Come tomorrow / Nothing in the world	Okeh 4-7141
1962	Come on naby (Hold my hand) / What kind of fool (do you think I am)	Okeh 4-7147
1963	I was born again / I don't wanna walk alone	Diamond 136
1963	The nearness of you / Walk away	Diamond 149
1964	Make yourself at home / I was born again	Diamond 171
1964	Comes the night / Cry me a river	Musicor 1076
1964	That's no way to treat a girl / Say it again	Musicor 1106
1964	That's no way to treat a girl	Kent 024 (2002)
1964	A little too lonely / You lie so well	Musicor 1128
1965	Come tomorrow / Nothing in the world	Okeh 4-7218

=== With other artists ===
Artist	Year	Song	Publisher & No.
The Sunset Four (aka Sunset Jubilee Singers)	1946	If I could just make it in / Where shall I go	Signature 32004
The Sunset Four (aka Sunset Jubilee Singers)	1946	I'll let nothing separate me... / I just couldn't keep it to myself	Signature 32005
The Sunset Four (aka Sunset Jubilee Singers)	1946	I just couldn't keep it to myself / The Negro national anthem	Haven 501
The Sunset Four (aka Sunset Jubilee Singers)	1946	Negro national anthem / Where could I go but to the Lord	Signature 32006
The Sunset Four (aka Sunset Jubilee Singers)	1946	I'll let nothing separate me... / Where could I go	Haven 502
The Sunset Four (aka Sunset Jubilee Singers)	1946	The Lord will make a way / I'll never turn back no more	Signature 32007
The Sunset Four (aka Sunset Jubilee Singers)	1946	I'll never turn back no more / The Lord will make a way	Haven 503
The Sunset Four (aka Sunset Jubilee Singers)	1946	Today / Something within me banishes pain	Haven 504
The Sunset Four (aka Sunset Jubilee Singers)	1949	The Negro national anthem / I just couldn't keep it to myself	Candy 4000
Sam Price Trio	1948	What could I do / I must see Jesus	Decca 48072
Sam Price Trio	1948	The land beyond the river / My heavenly father watches over me	Decca 48084
Sam Price Trio	1949	I can't forget it, can you / Up in my heavenly home	Decca 48102
Sam Price Trio	1949	I must have Jesus all the time / I thank you Jesus	Decca 48120
Sam Price Trio	1950	Live the life / Seal of heaven	Decca 48147
Sam Price Trio	1950	Lord search my heart / In shaded green pastures	Decca 48173
Sam Price Trio	1950	The Florida storm / Hallelujah what a storm	Decca 48189
Sister Rosetta Tharpe, Sam Price Trio	1947	Oh when I come to the end of my journey / This train	Decca 48043
Sister Rosetta Tharpe, Sam Price Trio	1947	Stretch out / Didn't it rain	Decca 48054
Sister Rosetta Tharpe, Sam Price Trio	1948	Beams of heaven / Precious memories	Decca 48070
Sister Rosetta Tharpe, Sam Price Trio	1948	Up above my head I hear music in the air / My journey to the sky	Decca 48090
Sister Rosetta Tharpe, Sam Price Trio	1951	Milky white way / His eye is on the sparrow	Decca 48227
Sister Rosetta Tharpe	1949	He watches me / He's all I need	Decca 48098
Sister Rosetta Tharpe	1950	I shall know him / I was healed	Decca 48194
Sister Rosetta Tharpe	1952	There is a highway to heaven / I'm bound for higher grounds	Decca 28509
Sister Rosetta Tharpe	1952	Old landmark / Pressing on	Decca 9-28625
Sister Rosetta Tharpe	1954	Nobody's fault but mine / Shadrack	Decca 48309
Georgia Peach	1946	I just rose to tell you / Today	Signature 32024
The Dependable Boys, Sam Price Trio	1949	Gospel train / Behold his face	Decca 48092
Vivian Cooper, Sam Price Trio	1949	Out of the depth / Touch me Lord Jesus	Decca 48111
"Jersey Joe" Walcott	1950	Have faith / Say a little prayer	Decca 14594
The Anita Kerr Sisters	1952	Wildwood / He's my light	Decca 28128
The Nightingales	1953	The old rugged cross / Satisfied with Jesus	Brunswick 05071
Leroy Kirkland and his Orchestra	1954	You got a way of making love / I know every move you make	Decca 48315
The Griffins	1956	As long as I love / Tell me why	Wing 90069
The Millionaires	1956	Sings the gospel (LP)	Mercury MG 20196
The Howard Biggs Orchestra	1957	I'm a little fooler / Am I reaching for the moon	Mercury 71055
Teacho Wiltshire Orchestra	1958	I thought I told you not to tell them / September song	Baton 253
Rex Garvin	1959	I can't sit down / Miracles	Carlton 502
Junior Lewis	1960	Better Wait And See	CDKEND 212 (2002)

- 1975 Blues Alliance 257004 - Today LP
- 2001 Westside - Bluesoul Belles Vol. 4: Scepter & Musicor Recordings (Compilation; Judy Clay, Marie Knight)
- 2002 Gospel Friend - Hallelujah What a Song (Compilation)
- 2007 M. C. Records MC-0058 - Let Us Get Together LP
