= 5-4-3-2-1 =

1964 single by Manfred Mann

Single by Manfred Mann

from the EP Manfred Mann's Cock-a-Hoop
- B-side: "Without You"
- Released: 10 January 1964
- Recorded: 17 December 1963
- Studio: Abbey Road Studios, London
- Genre: Rhythm and blues; pop
- Length: 1:59
- Label: His Master's Voice
- Songwriters: Paul Jones; Mike Hugg; Manfred Mann
- Producer: John Burgess

Manfred Mann singles chronology
| "Cock-a-Hoop" (1963) | "5-4-3-2-1" (1964) | "Hubble Bubble (Toil and Trouble)" (1964) |

"5-4-3-2-1" is a 1964 song by British band Manfred Mann, written by the group's eponymous keyboardist Manfred Mann along with Mike Hugg and Paul Jones. Released as a single on 10 January 1964, the track peaked at number 5 on the UK Singles Chart, becoming the band's breakthrough single and first commercial hit as the theme tune for the weekly ITV pop music television programme Ready Steady Go!. In an interview with Uncut, Mann said that he regarded Ready Steady Go as being like a rocket, and wrote the song as a countdown to launch it.

The song contains the self-referential lyric "Uh-huh, it was the Mannnn-freds!", and would be the last single released before bass player Dave Richmond left the band.

After the single's success, the group's follow-up single "Hubble Bubble (Toil and Trouble)" was a relative downturn, peaking at number 11 in the UK. Due to this, the band resorted to recording a cover version of "Do Wah Diddy Diddy" (originally performed by vocal group the Exciters) as their next release, which became a trans-Atlantic number one hit and their first international chart success.

In 1982, it was used for the advert for the 54321 chocolate bar, which was also performed by Manfred Mann and featured Rik Mayall in the early adverts. In 1997 the Spice Girls' jingle used to introduce Channel 5, "1-2-3-4-5", was loosely based on "5-4-3-2-1". British supermarket chain Tesco used the song in adverts for £5 off a £40 spend in 2012.

== Personnel ==
- Paul Jones – lead vocals, harmonica
- Manfred Mann – keyboards, backing vocals
- Mike Vickers – guitar
- Dave Richmond – bass guitar, backing vocals
- Mike Hugg – drums
