= Ready Steady Go! =

British television music series (1963–1966)

- Title screen
- Also known as: RSG!
- Created by: Elkan Allan
- Presented by: Keith Fordyce and Cathy McGowan
- Country of origin: United Kingdom
- Original language: English

Production
- Producers: Francis Hitching; Vicki Wickham; Elkan Allan
- Production company: Associated Rediffusion

Original release
- Network: ITV
- Release: 9 August 1963 – 23 December 1966

Ready Steady Go! (or RSG!) is a British rock/pop music television programme broadcast every Friday evening from 9 August 1963 until 23 December 1966. It was conceived by Elkan Allan, head of Associated-Rediffusion. Allan wanted a light entertainment programme different from the low-brow style of light entertainment transmitted by ATV. The programme was produced without scenery or costumes and with a minimum of choreography and make-up. Allan recruited a fellow journalist, Francis Hitching, as producer. Hitching became a major figure in light entertainment in the 1960s. Robert Fleming was the first director, followed by the documentary director Rollo Gamble, then Michael Lindsay-Hogg, Daphne Shadwell and Peter Croft.

The programme was produced by Associated-Rediffusion, the weekday ITV contractor for London, called Rediffusion-London after 1964. The live show was eventually networked nationally. The show gained its highest ratings on 20 March 1964 when it featured the Beatles being interviewed and performing "It Won't Be Long", "You Can't Do That" and "Can't Buy Me Love" – the last being a hit at the time.

In the 1980s Dave Clark of the Dave Clark Five acquired the rights to Ready Steady Go! and its surviving recordings. On 10 January 2018, BMG Rights Management announced that it had acquired the ancillary rights to the show.

== Description ==
The show went out early on Friday evenings with the line "The weekend starts here!", and was introduced by the Surfaris' "Wipe Out", later by Manfred Mann's "5-4-3-2-1", then Manfred Mann's "Hubble Bubble (Toil and Trouble)", and finally The Rolling Stones' "Goin' Home". There is also the possibility that The Who's "Anyway, Anyhow, Anywhere" was used as the theme music for a short period. It was more youth-orientated and informal than its BBC rival (from 1964), Top of the Pops. It was notable for featuring the audience as dancers, and for the interaction of artists and audience. Artists appeared on different mini-stages, sometimes on studio gantries and stairs, or on the main floor for solo artists, closely surrounded by the audience. The producers chose the audience in London clubs, picking out the best or the most fashionably dressed dancers. This ensured a hip audience in tune with the artists.

Owing to scheduling of local news in parts of the UK, several ITV regions joined the show part-way through.

Initially, RSG! artists mimed but by late 1964 some performed live and the show switched to all-live performances in April 1965. It was noted for allowing artists to perform the full version of songs rather than short versions demanded by other shows. The programme was never broadcast in the United States, airing in the U.K. in black and white when ABC, CBS and NBC were converting to full colour.

The show was recorded at small studios in Rediffusion's headquarters in Kingsway, London. Although the company had bigger facilities at Wembley in the west of the capital, it was easier to attract stars and audiences to central London. As the studios were compact it was not possible to hide the ever-present cameras. Instead, the cameras, which were large with rotating lens turrets rather than zooms, were sometimes incorporated into the action, including in a Manfred Mann performance of "Machines", which ended with Paul Jones singing crouched on the floor surrounded by cameras.

RSG was originally from Studio 9 in Kingsway when artists mimed; it later moved to Studio 5 at Wembley, enabling artists to perform live. As artists' own recorded backing tracks were not allowed by the Musicians' Union, the whole of Studio 5 (normally divided into 5a and 5b) was used so that an orchestra could perform the backing live.

The show was popular among young people. It had a particular following among the mod youth subculture of the 1960s.

In late 1966, when the "beat boom" was fading, the show was cancelled, despite its popularity. Compilations were broadcast on Channel 4 in the 1990s and VHS videos included a Beatles live special and The Sounds of Motown special edition. In 1989 the show was seen for the first time in the US, on Disney Channel. During that time, Disney was a pay channel aimed at adults at night.

Ready Steady Go! was released as a limited edition DVD set by Kaleidoscope Home Entertainment in 2023 (with performances by the Beatles removed due to licensing problems). Copies can be found (at inflated prices) on auction sites.

== Origin of "The Weekend Starts Here" ==
After the recording of the pilot episode on Tuesday 16 July 1963, Keith Fordyce approached a group of Mods who had travelled from Sheffield's King Mojo club and asked 'so you chaps have come all the way from Sheffield on a Tuesday no less. I expect you'll be eager to go home and get back to work, what with the weekend coming up and all.'

John Varney, Sheffield 'Ace Face' replied 'are you kidding mate – the weekend starts here' and the slogan was born. Over the next three years, Pete Stringfellow and the Sheffield Mojo crowd were regulars on the now renamed 'Ready Steady Go'.

== Presenters and producers ==
The best known presenters were Keith Fordyce and Cathy McGowan, though early shows were introduced by Dusty Springfield. The show was occasionally presented by David Gell and Michael Aldred. Both McGowan and Aldred joined after answering an advertisement for "a typical teenager" as adviser. They found themselves presenting the show, and McGowan's status as a fan was evident in her style; stumbling over lines and losing her cool, her inexperience made her more rather than less popular, and by the end she was presenting alone. She also joined in fun and games, including miming with the Rolling Stones to other people's records, including "I Got You Babe".

== Featured artists ==
Manfred Mann performing at RSG! studio

The show featured most successful artists of the era, among them the Who, the Beatles, the Hollies, the Merseybeats, the Zombies, Dusty Springfield, the Supremes,the Miracles, the Temptations, the Walker Brothers, the Kinks, Paul Butterfield Blues Band, Gerry & the Pacemakers, the Fourmost, the Rolling Stones, Donovan, the Fortunes, Helen Shapiro, P.J. Proby, Otis Redding, Freddie and the Dreamers, the Dave Clark Five, Bobby Vee, the Animals, The Crickets, Cilla Black, Gulliver's People, the Searchers, Georgie Fame and the Blue Flames, Billy Fury, Lulu, Marvin Gaye, Gene Pitney and the Beach Boys (who made their first appearance on British television on the show).

It also featured Sandie Shaw, Burt Bacharach, Jerry Lee Lewis, Paul Simon (who would later cite his appearance as his worst experience while living in England), Kenny Lynch, the Small Faces, the Shirelles, James Brown & the Famous Flames, the Yardbirds, Them, Jim Reeves and the Four Pennies.

During the 4 October 1963 episode – The Beatles' first appearance – Paul McCartney judged four teenage girls miming to Brenda Lee's "Let's Jump the Broomstick" (the group had opened for Lee before becoming famous), choosing 14-year-old Melanie Coe as winner. Three years later, after Coe's disappearance made the front page of the Daily Mirror, McCartney used the article as the basis for "She's Leaving Home".

Jimi Hendrix made his first television appearance in Britain on RSG! with "Hey Joe", performing live. After this, his club tour sold out and he was added to a nationwide tour by the Walker Brothers.

Dusty Springfield devised and introduced the RSG Motown Special in April 1965, featuring the Supremes, Stevie Wonder, the Miracles and Martha and the Vandellas, which was a VHS video in the 1980s. The Supremes performed their "Stop! In the Name of Love" dance routine for the first time on the show, and The Miracles closed the show with their hit, "Mickey's Monkey".

The Who proved particularly popular, making the most 'Live' appearances of any artist – a total of 18 live performances between January 1965 and December 1966. The band had an episode to themselves entitled Ready Steady Who, broadcast in October 1966. The band also released an EP of the same name; despite the title all of the tracks were studio recordings which had been made previously.

On 20 March 2020, BBC Four broadcast a documentary about Ready Steady Go!, with original clips, plus interviews with Martha Reeves, Mary Wilson, Paul Jones, Chris Farlowe, Vicki Wickham, Annie Nightingale and Michael Lindsay Hogg.
