= Plains Music =

Studio album by Manfred Mann's Plains Music
- Released: 17 August 1991
- Recorded: 1990
- Studio: Workhouse Studios, London; RPM, South Africa
- Genre: Progressive rock, jazz fusion, folk
- Length: 35:45
- Label: Kaz Records; Cohesion
- Producer: Manfred Mann

Manfred Mann's Plains Music chronology
Masque (1987)	Plains Music (1991)	Soft Vengeance (1996)

Professional ratings
Review scores
Source	Rating
Allmusic	2.0/5 stars

Plains Music is an album released in 1991 by Manfred Mann's Plains Music, which was a project initiated by Manfred Mann after he retired his Earth Band in the late 1980s.

"This album is called Plains Music, as it consists mainly of the melodies of the North American Plains Indians. We do not pretend that it is in any sense representative of the original ethnic music which was its source material. I tried to make a simple album of plain music, using as few notes as possible and keeping the tracks short and to the point." - Manfred Mann 1991

Mann recorded some of the album in his homeland, which he had been exiled from for nearly three decades because of his opposition to apartheid.

The album was initially released in 1991 and was re-mastered digitally with three additional tracks in 1998.

== Track listing ==
Side one

1. "Kiowa (Kiowa Wind Song)" (Traditional; arranged by Manfred Mann) – 3:16
2. "Medicine Song (Apache Medicine Song)" (Traditional; arranged by Mann, Anthony Moore) – 4:15
3. "Wounded Knee (Dakota Ghost Dance Song)" (Traditional; arranged by Mann) – 4:51
4. "Laguna (Laguna Corn Grinding Song)" (Traditional; arranged by Mann) – 4:56

Side two

5. "Sikelele I (Based on South African Xhosa Stick Fighting Song)" (Mann, Mike Heron) – 3:43
6. "Hunting Bow" (Traditional; arranged by Mann) – 1:35
7. "Instrumedicine Song (As Medicine Song)" (Traditional; arranged by Mann) – 4:06
8. "Sikelele II (As Sikelele I)" (Mann) – 4:03
9. "Hunting Bow (Reprise) (Kiowa War Song)" (Traditional; arranged by Mann) – 2:40

Bonus Tracks (1998 re-issue)

10. "Salmon Fishing" (Traditional; arranged by Mann) – 4:02
11. "L.I.A.S.O.M." (Michael Martin Murphey, Charles John Quarto) – 3:51
12. "Medicine Song" (re-mix) (Traditional; arranged by Mann, Moore) – 4:16

== Personnel ==
- Manfred Mann - keyboards
- Noel McCalla - vocals
- Barbara Thompson - saxophones
- Peter Sklair - bass
- Ian Hermann - drums, percussion

with

- Smiler Makana - African hunting bows
- Kelly Petlane - pennywhistle
- Doren Thobeki - additional vocals
- Walter Sanza - additional vocals
- Chief Dawethi - additional vocals
- Re-mastered by: Robert M Corich and Mike Brown
