= West Virginia Folklore Society =

American organization

- Abbreviation: WVFS
- Formation: July 15, 1915
- Founder: John Harrington Cox, Robert Armstrong, Walter Barnes
- Founded at: West Virginia
- Type: Non-profit organization
- Purpose: Studying and collecting folklore in the United States
- Location: United States
- Region served: United States
- Fields: Folklore
- Official language: English
- Key people: John Harrington Cox, Robert Armstrong, Walter Barnes
- Publication: Folk-Songs of the South: Collected Under the Auspices of the West Virginia Folk-Lore Society

The West Virginia Folklore Society was an organization devoted to studying and collecting folklore in the United States, founded on July 15, 1915. It was among the most prominent such organizations in the early 20th century.

John Harrington Cox, archivist and editor for the West Virginia Folklore Society, published an influential collection of folk songs in 1925, called Folk-Songs of the South: Collected Under the Auspices of the West Virginia Folk-Lore Society. Cox had founded the society with WVU vice-president Robert Armstrong and Walter Barnes of Fairmont Normal School.
