= The One in the Middle =

EP by Manfred Mann
- Released: 18 June 1965
- Recorded: 28 July, 16 November 1964; 11 January, 12, 16–17 March 1965
- Studios: EMI Studios, London
- Genre: Rock and roll
- Label: His Master's Voice
- Producer: John Burgess

Manfred Mann chronology
Groovin' with Manfred Mann (1964)	The One in the Middle (1965)	Mann Made (1965)

Manfred Mann EP chronology
Groovin' with Manfred Mann (1964)	The One in the Middle (1965)	No Living Without Loving (1965)

The One in the Middle is an EP by Manfred Mann, released in 1965. The EP is a 7-inch vinyl record and released in mono with the catalogue number His Master's Voice 7EG 8908. The record was the number-one EP in the UK for nine weeks during the summer of 1965. The cover picture was taken by Nicholas Wright.

== Background ==
The title song The One in the Middle was written by Manfred Mann's lead singer Paul Jones for Keith Relf of the Yardbirds, but Relf "shied away from the lyrics". It was then determined that Jones would sing it and he did, mastering "the art of singing tongue in cheek". The Dylan song ("With God On Our Side"), set to piano and military snare-drum, was the first of several recorded by the band, included here, according to the record's liner notes, because Dylan had attended a Manfred Mann gig and declared them "real groovy". The remaining tracks see the Manfreds on familiar ground, mining the US Rhythm and Blues charts for a Paul Jones vocal vehicle and picking up a funky jazz-blues classic that, like the title track, leaves room for the band's excellent soloing.

== Chart performance ==
The record reached the number one spot on the UK's EP charts three times. It first topped the chart on 19 June 1965, only to be displaced a week later by The Rolling Stones' Got Live If You Want It!. After a week Manfred Mann recaptured the top spot for four weeks only to see the Rolling Stones regain it for another week before The One in the Middle went back to number one again for another four weeks.

== Track listing ==
Side A

1. "The One in the Middle" (Paul Jones)
2. "Watermelon Man" (Herbie Hancock, Jon Hendricks)

Side B

3. "What Am I to Do" (Phil Spector, Doc Pomus)
4. "With God On Our Side" (Bob Dylan)
