= Francis Hitching =

English writer

- Born: Francis Hitching
- Occupation: Writer
- Writing career
- Period: Active: 20th Century
- Genre: Paranormal
- Notable works: The Neck of the Giraffe or Where Darwin Went Wrong; Earth Magic
- Literary movement: Paranormal

John Francis Hitching (1933–2018) was a British author, dowser, journalist and filmmaker.

== Biography ==
John Francis Hitching was the son of Luise Hitching. He grew up in Stratford-upon-Avon and attended Warwick School. He worked as a journalist in Birmingham. In 1958, he married Judith Anne Wellstood at St. Nicholas Church, Loxley.

Hitching has written on Earth mysteries, dowsing, paranormal and ley lines. In his book Pendulum: The Psi Connection (1977), he came to the conclusion that dowsing is genuine, listing a number of alternative explanations such as electromagnetism and psychic ability that he thought were associated with dowsing.

Stuart Fleming in the New Scientist gave Hitching's book Earth Magic (1978) a positive review; the book linked many of the megaliths around Europe to groups of men whom he called "megalithic mathematicians".

Hitching also wrote The World Atlas of Mysteries (1981); an atlas which listed many of Earth mysteries. The book was criticized in the New Scientist for some of his conclusions such as linking animal extinctions to reversals in the Earth's magnetic field.

Hitching died in 2018.

== Evolution ==
Hitching was the author of the book The Neck of the Giraffe or Where Darwin Went Wrong (1983), which advocates non-darwinian evolution. A review on talk.origins stated that Hitching believes that "evolution is directed by some sort of cosmic force, but does not like Darwinism." Science writer Richard Dawkins wrote that The Neck of the Giraffe "is one of the silliest and most ignorant I have read for years." The book has been widely cited by creationists.

== Books published ==
- Pendulum: The Psi connection (1977)
- Earth Magic The Astounding Mystery of the Greatest of All Lost Civilizations (1977)
- Earth Magic (1976)
- Dowsing: The psi connection (1978)
- The World Atlas of Mysteries (1978)
- The Mysterious World: An Atlas of the Unexplained (1979)
- The Neck of the Giraffe or Where Darwin Went Wrong (1982)
- Boom Business of the 90s: Essential Start-Up Guide to Network Marketing (1992)
