= Sha La La =

1964 single by the Shirelles

Single by the Shirelles

from the album Hear & Now
- B-side: "His Lips Get in the Way"
- Released: March 1964
- Genre: R&B
- Length: 2:15
- Label: Scepter
- Songwriters: Robert Mosely, Robert Taylor
- Producers: Luther Dixon, Bob Irwin

The Shirelles singles chronology
"Tonight You're Gonna Fall in Love with Me" (1964)	"Sha La La" (1964)	"Thank You Baby" (1964)

"Sha La La" is a song written by Robert Mosely (whose name is spelled "Moseley" on the record) and Robert Taylor. The Shirelles released the original version of the song as a single in March 1964 in the US, reaching number 15 on the U.S. R&B chart and number 69 on the U.S. pop chart. A cover by the British pop group Manfred Mann would follow that October, being the most notable version of the song, reaching number 3 on the UK singles chart and number 12 on both the U.S. pop chart and the RPM charts in 1965. Around the same time as the release of Manfred Mann's version, the song was adapted into French by Georges Aber and performed by French pop singer Sylvie Vartan, whose version was released as a single in October 1964 and reached number 14 on the French Belgian chart.

== Manfred Mann recording ==
"Sha La La"

Single by Manfred Mann

from the album The Five Faces of Manfred Mann (US only)
- B-side: "John Hardy"
- Released: October 9, 1964
- Recorded: September 22–23, 1964
- Genre: Rock
- Length: 2:30
- Label: Ascot, His Master's Voice
- Songwriters: Robert Mosley, Robert Taylor
- Producer: John Burgess

Manfred Mann singles chronology
"Do Wah Diddy Diddy" (1964)	"Sha La La" (1964)	"Come Tomorrow" (1965)

The most successful version was performed by British pop group Manfred Mann. It reached number 3 on the UK singles chart and number 12 on both the U.S. pop chart and the Canadian chart in 1965. It reached number seven on the New Zealand Lever Hit parade. It was featured on the US version of their 1965 album The Five Faces of Manfred Mann.

Cash Box described it as "a delightful rock-a-rhythmic beat refitting of the Shirelles' few-seasons-back click."

== Other notable versions ==
"Sha la la"

Single by Sylvie Vartan
- Language: French
- B-side: "Il n’a rien retrouvé"
- Released: October 1964
- Recorded: 1964
- Genre: Pop
- Length: 2:14
- Label: RCA Victor
- Songwriters: Robert Mosley, Robert Taylor, Georges Aber

Sylvie Vartan singles chronology
"Mister Moonlight" (1964)	"Sha la la" (1964)	"L'homme en noir" (1964)

In 1964, the song was adapted into French by Georges Aber and performed by French pop singer Sylvie Vartan, whose version was released as a single in October 1964 and reached number 14 on the Ultratop Wallonia charts (French Belgium).
