= John Hardy (song) =

American folk song

"John Hardy" or "Old John Hardy" is a traditional American folk song based on the life of a railroad worker living in McDowell County, West Virginia in the Spring of 1893. The historical John Hardy is believed to have gotten into a drunken dispute during a craps game held near Keystone, and subsequently killed a man named Thomas Drews. Hardy was found guilty of murder in the first degree, and was hanged on January 19, 1894, with 3,000 people allegedly in attendance.

== Overview ==
The song has been performed by numerous artists from the 1920s through the present, including (in alphabetical order) Tom Adams, Clarence "Tom" Ashley, Long John Baldry, Bobby Bare, Leon Bibb, Norman Blake, Billy Strings, Dock Boggs, Jimmy Bowen, The Carter Family, Billy Childish, Roy Clark, Michael Cleveland, The Coachmen, Fred Cockerham, Country Gazette, The Country Gentlemen, The Dillards, Lonnie Donegan, The Easy Riders, Ramblin' Jack Elliott, Paul Evans, Raymond Fairchild, Flatt & Scruggs with Doc Watson, Bela Fleck, Michael Fracasso, Bill Frisell, The Gun Club, Alvin Youngblood Hart, Roy Harvey, Higher Ground Bluegrass, Wayne Henderson, Bart Hopkin, Lightnin' Hopkins, Cisco Houston, Burl Ives, Tommy Jarrell, Buell Kazee, Kentucky Colonels, The Kingston Trio, Koerner, Ray & Glover, Tim Lake, Lead Belly, The Lilly Brothers, Laura Love, Manfred Mann (as the B-side to their hit single "Sha La La"), Ed McCurdy, John McEuen, Joni Mitchell, Katy Moffatt, Bill Monroe, Andrew Morse, Alan Munde, Northern Lights, Osborne Brothers, Peter Ostroushko, Pine Valley Cosmonauts, Jerry Reed, Ola Belle Reed, Don Reno, Tony Rice, Dick Rosmini, Luther Russell, Doug Sahm, Earl Scruggs, Charles Seeger, Mike Seeger, Pete Seeger, Silver Apples, Martin Simpson, Sir Douglas Quintet, Sleepy Man Banjo Boys, Hobart Smith, Chris Smither, Roger Sprung, John Stewart, Ernest Stoneman, The String Cheese Incident, Steve Suffet, Todd Taylor, George Thorogood, Tony Trischka, The Twilights, Uncle Tupelo, Ben Webster, The Williamson Brothers and Glenn Yarbrough.

The earliest known recordings are credited to Eva Davis for Columbia in 1924, Ernest Stoneman for Okeh in 1925, and Buell Kazee for Brunswick in 1927. As with many other traditional folk songs, lyrics change from version to version. Early folk historians confused the ballads of John Hardy and John Henry. This has led to a mixing of stories related to Hardy and Henry, both African American men of the post-bellum period. In fact, the historical John Henry was a steel driver, not a railroad worker. John Harrington Cox, in an early (1919) article in The Journal of American Folklore attempts to disentangle the history of the two songs and their main characters, and provides a detailed discussion of five versions of "John Hardy."

Interestingly, most later versions of the song open with the lyric, "John Hardy was a desperate little man." But this may be a mondegreen for "desperating" considering how all contemporary accounts of the real John Hardy describe him as about six feet tall and strongly built. Alternate early lyrics describe him as a "brave little man" or a "brave and desperate man."

Martin Simpson has written and recorded a song 'Thomas Drew' which recounts the tale from the point of view of the victim.

== See also ==
- "Stagger Lee," another standard folk ballad of a gambler-turned-murderer
