= With God on Our Side (song) =

Anti-war song by Bob Dylan

Song by Bob Dylan

from the album The Times They Are a-Changin'
- Released: January 13, 1964
- Recorded: August 7, 1963
- Genre: Folk
- Length: 7:08
- Label: Columbia
- Songwriter: Bob Dylan
- Producer: Tom Wilson

"With God on Our Side" is a folk song by Bob Dylan, first performed during his debut at New York City's Town Hall on April 12, 1963. The song was released as the third track on his 1964 album The Times They Are A-Changin'. "With God on Our Side" is generally classified as an anti-war song for questioning the motives and justifications for war. In 2026, CBS News included it in its list of the 250 essential American songs of the past 250 years.

== Lyrics ==
The lyrics address the tendency of Americans (and people of other societies) to believe that God will invariably side with them and oppose those with whom they disagree, thus leaving unchallenged the morality of wars fought and atrocities committed by their country. Dylan mentions several historical events, including the slaughter of Native Americans in the nineteenth century, the Spanish–American War, the American Civil War, World War I and II, The Holocaust, the Cold War, and the betrayal of Jesus Christ by Judas Iscariot.

The original version of "With God on Our Side" did not reference the escalating conflict in Vietnam. However, when performing the song in the 1980s, Dylan added a new verse—written by Aaron Neville and recorded by The Neville Brothers—that ran as follows:

In the nineteen-sixties came the Vietnam War
Can somebody tell me what we're fightin' for?
So many young men died, so many mothers cried
Now I ask the question, was God on our side?

Tim Rice later said he was inspired by the song's lyric, "You'll have to decide / Whether Judas Iscariot / Had God on his side", to include Judas's perspective in Jesus Christ Superstar.

== Allegation of plagiarism ==
The melody of "With God on Our Side" is essentially identical to the traditional English folk song "The Merry Month of May", which was used by Dominic Behan in his song "The Patriot Game". The opening verse is also similar to the second verse of Behan's song in which the narrator gives his name and age. Behan criticized Dylan publicly by claiming the melody as an original composition and took the view that the provenance of Dylan's entire body of work must consequently be questioned. Historian Sean Wilentz suggested that Dylan had operated in the same folk tradition as Behan had when writing the song and borrowing the melody. Furthermore, at the 1963 Newport Folk Festival, Dylan himself acknowledged that he was inspired to write the song after hearing a rendition of "The Patriot Game" sung by Liam Clancy, thus admitting the origins of the song's melody.

== Incidents of censorship ==
In a 1984 interview with David Barsamian, Anthony B. Herbert reported that while serving in the U.S. Army during the Vietnam War, he was asked by a general to stop playing a record containing Joan Baez's version of "With God on Our Side," with the general describing Baez as "anti-military".

== Live recordings ==
Dylan and Joan Baez first performed the song as a duet at the May 1963 Monterey Folk Festival. They again sang it as a duet at the Newport Folk Festival in July 1963 and July 1964. The July 1963 performance was released on Newport Broadside: Topical Songs at the Newport Folk Festival 1963 (Vanguard VSD-79144). The liner notes mention Dominic Behan's "The Patriot Game", pointing out that Behan had borrowed the melody from the traditional "The Merry Month of May". Another live version of "With God on Our Side" by Dylan and Baez, recorded on October 31, 1964, can be found on the album The Bootleg Series Vol. 6: Bob Dylan Live 1964, Concert at Philharmonic Hall, released in 2004.

A rare post-1960s performance of the song, recorded on November 4, 1975, with extra lyrics, was included on the bonus disc in the box set The Rolling Thunder Revue: The 1975 Live Recordings (2019). Dylan's performance of the song on the album Bob Dylan Unplugged, released in 1995, omitted verses about the Germans and the Holocaust, and the Russians and the Cold War.

== Use in films and documentaries ==
- "With God on Our Side" plays over the closing credits of two films, Oren Jacoby's 2007 documentary on anti-Semitism, Constantine's Sword, and Oliver Stone's 2008 biography of George W. Bush, W.
- Used several times in Ken Burns' The Vietnam War.
- K'naan's version of the song was used during the ending credits in Michael Moore's 2018 film Fahrenheit 11/9.

== Covers ==
- Manfred Mann covered the song on the B-side of their EP The One in the Middle because, according to the record's liner notes, Dylan had attended a Manfred Mann gig and declared them "real groovy".
- The Mitchell Trio performed the song on their 1965 album Typical American Boys.
- Odetta covered the song on her Odetta Sings Dylan album.
- Straylight Run recorded the song on their Prepare to Be Wrong EP.
- San Francisco-based alternative rock band Wire Train recorded the song as "God On Our Side" for their 1985 album Between Two Words, and the recording appears on their compilation "Last Perfect Thing".
- The 2012 compilation album Chimes of Freedom featured a version by Canadian musician K'Naan with verses reflecting the singer's upbringing in Somalia.
- Cleveland Francis covered the song on his album Beyond The Willow Tree, recorded between 1968-1970 and released in 2022.
- In 2026, Meshell Ndegeocello covered the song, with vocals by Bill Callahan and Chris Thile, on her album Synonym.

== See also ==
- List of anti-war songs
