= Manfred Mann (musician) =

South African-born musician (born 1940)

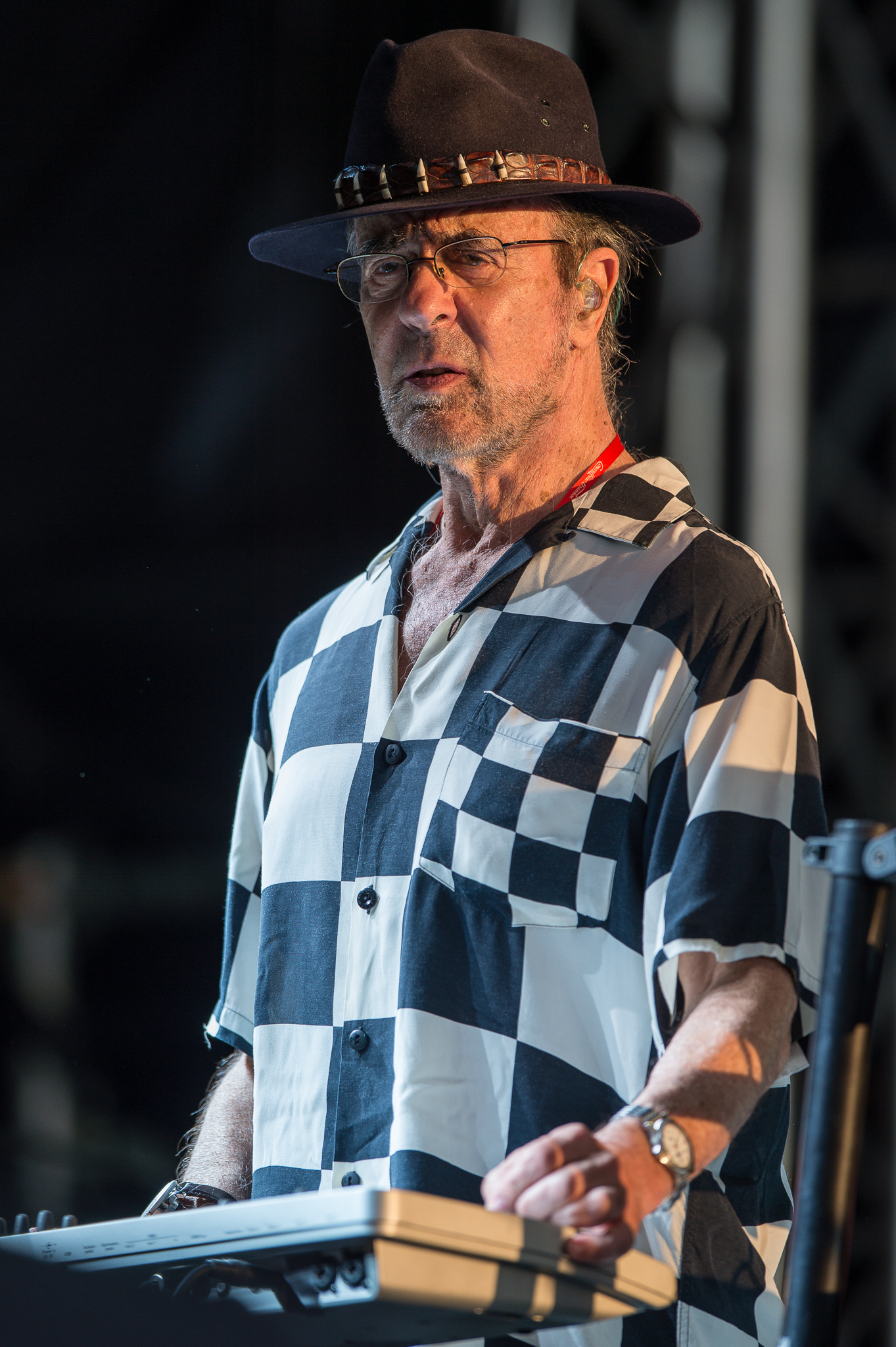
- Mann performing with his Earth Band in 2016

Background information
- Born: Manfred Sepse Lubowitz; 21 October 1940 (age 85); Johannesburg, Union of South Africa
- Origin: London, England
- Genres: Beat; blues rock; R&B; psychedelia; jazz rock; progressive rock; hard rock
- Occupations: Musician; songwriter; record producer
- Instruments: Keyboards; vocals; synthesiser
- Years active: Early 1960s–present
- Member of: Manfred Mann's Earth Band
- Formerly of: Manfred Mann; Manfred Mann Chapter Three
- Website: manfredmann.co.uk

Manfred Sepse Lubowitz (born 21 October 1940), known professionally as Manfred Mann, is a South African-born musician, residing in the UK since 1961. He is best known as a founding member of the eponymous bands Manfred Mann, Manfred Mann Chapter Three and Manfred Mann's Earth Band.

== Early life and career ==
Lubowitz was raised in a Lithuanian Jewish family in Johannesburg, the son of David Lubowitz and Alma Cohen. He studied music at the University of the Witwatersrand, and worked as a jazz pianist at a number of clubs in Johannesburg.

Strongly opposed to the apartheid system in his native South Africa, Lubowitz moved to the United Kingdom in 1961 and began to write for Jazz News under the pseudonym Manfred Manne (after jazz drummer Shelly Manne), which was soon shortened to Manfred Mann.

== Manfred Mann (band) ==
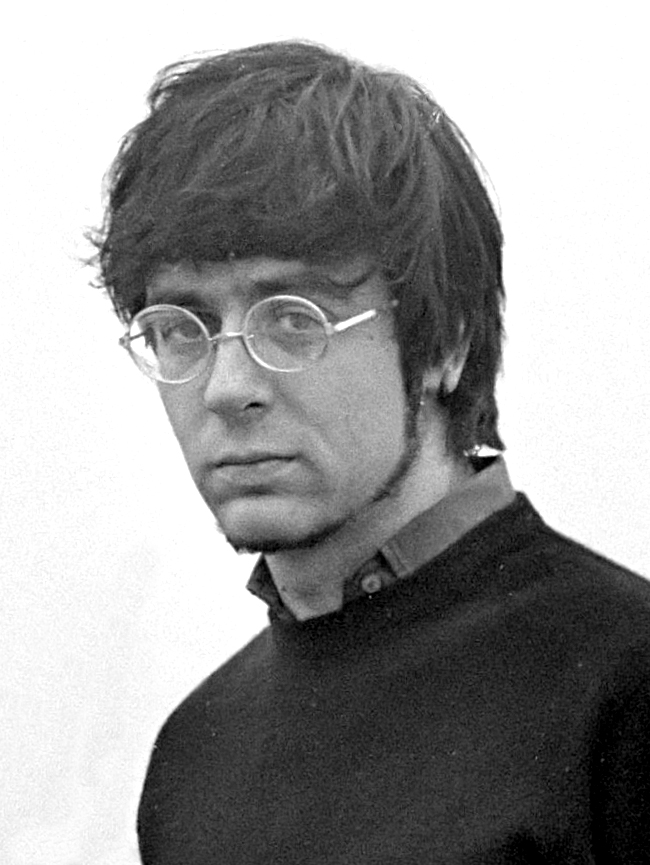
Mann in 1967

In 1962, he met drummer and keyboard player Mike Hugg at Clacton Butlins Holiday Camp; together they formed a large blues-jazz band called the Mann-Hugg Blues Brothers. This eventually evolved into a five-piece group named after him, and they signed a record deal with EMI in 1963, under the His Master's Voice label.

Prominent in the Swinging London scene of the 1960s, the group regularly appeared in the UK Singles Chart. Three of their most successful singles, "Do Wah Diddy Diddy", "Pretty Flamingo", and "Mighty Quinn", topped the UK charts. The band's 1964 hit "5-4-3-2-1" was the theme tune for the ITV pop music show Ready Steady Go!. They were also the first southern-England-based group to top the US Billboard Hot 100 during the British Invasion.

The band split up in 1969.

== Manfred Mann Chapter Three ==
With Manfred Mann recently broken up, Mann and Mike Hugg created Manfred Mann Chapter Three. The group's debut performance, which was at Newcastle's Mayfair ballroom on 24 October 1969, consisted of Mann and Hugg on keyboards and organ, as well as:

- Bernie Living (alto sax)
- Steve York (bass guitar)
- Craig Collinge (drums)

They were also backed by a five-piece brass group consisting of:

- Clive Stevens (tenor sax)
- Carl Griffiths (tenor sax)
- Dave Coxhill (baritone sax)
- Gerald Drewett (trombone)
- Sonny Corbett (trumpet)

They recorded two albums: Manfred Mann Chapter Three, in 1969, and Manfred Mann Chapter Three Volume Two, in 1970. The group were never commercially successful, and split up in late 1970.

== Manfred Mann's Earth Band ==
In 1971, Mann formed Manfred Mann's Earth Band. They had a chart topping hit in 1976 with a cover of the 1973 Bruce Springsteen song "Blinded by the Light"; their cover went to number one in Canada and the U.S.

Although the group never had the same success of "Blinded by the Light", as of 2025 the band is still active, and Mann still tours with the group along with founding member Mick Rogers.

== Solo and guest work ==
Manfred Mann appeared as a jazz pianist in the 1969 Jesús Franco film Venus in Furs, and performed the score for that film. He also released solo projects under the names Manfred Mann's Plain Music and Manfred Mann '06.

Manfred Mann played a Minimoog solo on the Uriah Heep song "July Morning". He also played keyboards on Trevor Rabin's album Wolf.

== Style ==
Mann has used various keyboard instruments throughout his career (piano and organ in the early 1960s, later also including Mellotron), but he is especially known for his distinctive solo performance on the Minimoog synthesizer, which he personalized by extensive use of the filter. His keyboard parts are often improvised and inspired by jazz. One example, as he explained in an interview with eclipsed magazine, is his tendency to bend notes downwards on the synthesizer, which he says he got from Miles Davis.

In the 2000s, he regularly used a Roland keytar on stage for two or three songs. The instrument is visually striking for being decorated with zebra stripes, which were hand-painted by Des Hegarty.

In the early 1970s, he played drums during the intro of the song "Black and Blue".

=== Equipment ===
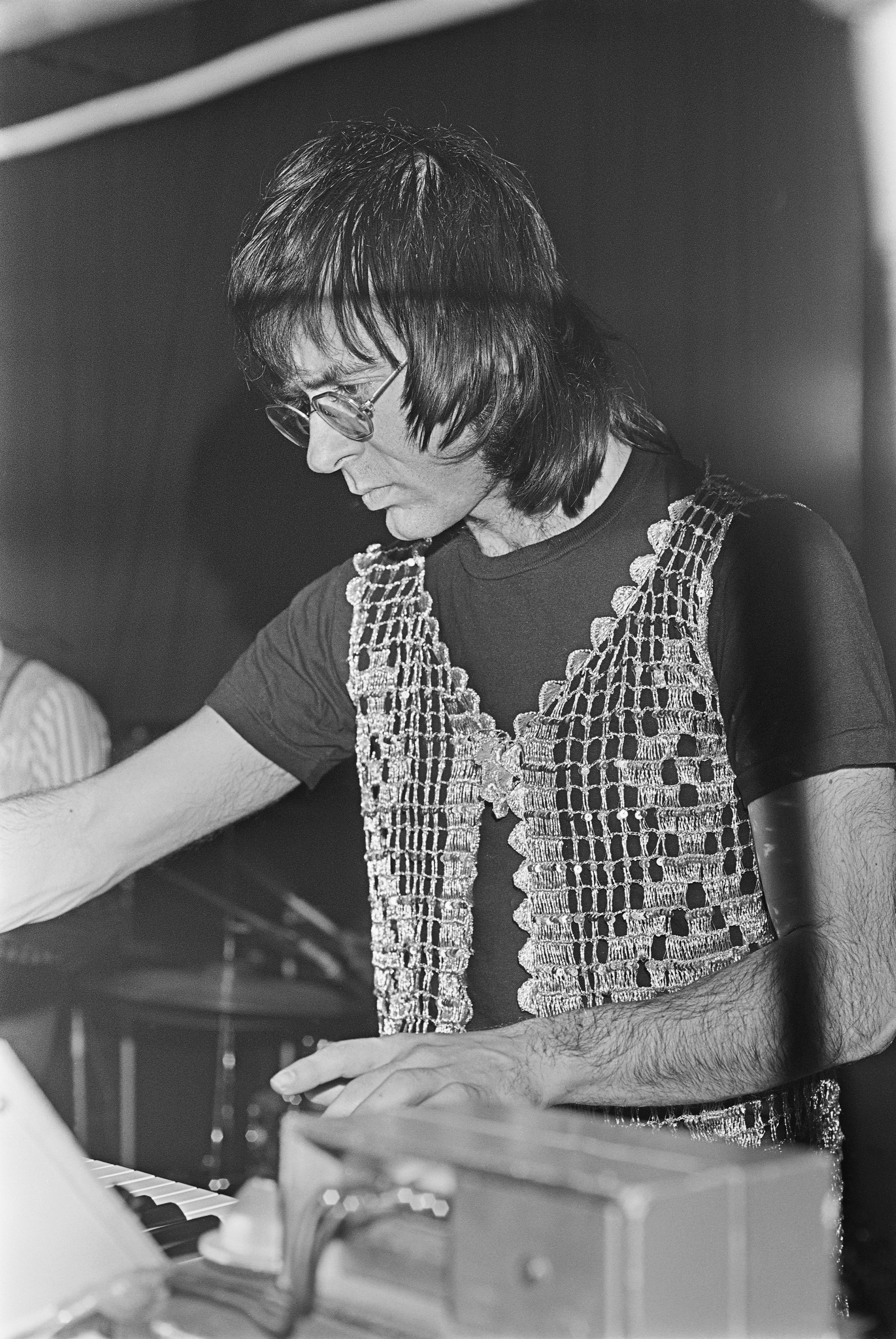
Mann in 1973

By the early 1970s, Mann used a Hammond M3 organ, which he had acquired from Alan Price and then modified to give it a grittier sound. This instrument was the basis for his live keyboard setup in Chapter Three as well as the classic Earth Band lineup until the late 1970s. For the Earth Band, Mann added a Minimoog monophonic synthesizer to his setup, which he had bought in the summer of 1971. By the mid-1970s he added a Fender Rhodes 73 Stage Piano to his setup.

In the late 1970s and early 1980s, Mann combined the Minimoog with an Oberheim SEM to expand the filter and effect section. At this point Mann used a considerably bigger live setup for which he had replaced the bulky Hammond M3 with a one-manual Korg CX-3 organ and added a Yamaha CP-70 for piano sounds as well as an ARP Omni for string sounds.

When digital keyboards became more common, Mann began replacing the bulky analogue instruments with them. In the early 1990s, he used a Yamaha SY77 and a Korg M-1 together with the Minimoog. During the 1990s Mann also used a Yamaha VL 1.

By the early 2000s, Mann had replaced the Minimoog with a new Minimoog Voyager for his live setup, which he combined with a Korg Z1 for other sounds. In the 2010s, he dropped the analogue Moog synthesizers from his live setup altogether and moved to a digital setup consisting of keyboards like the Roland V-Combo.

Mann has relied on effect pedals to achieve his keyboard sounds. When he was using an analogue setup, he fed his Hammond organ into a MXR Phase 100 and his Rhodes into an MXR Phase 90. His lead sounds are often combined with distortion pedals and fuzz boxes, especially for studio recordings. In the 1970s Mann used an Echoplex tape delay with his Minimoog.

During the 1970s, Mann used guitar amps to amplify his keyboard sounds. While the Hammond organ and Rhodes went into a 200-watt Hiwatt half stack, the Minimoog was amplified using an Acoustic half stack, consisting of an Acoustic 270 amp and an Acoustic 271 cabinet.

== Discography ==
- See Manfred Mann discography, Manfred Mann Chapter Three and Manfred Mann's Earth Band discography.
- Plains Music (1991) credited to Manfred Mann's Plains Music
- 2006 (2004) credited to Manfred Mann '06 with Manfred Mann's Earth Band
- Lone Arranger (2014)
