= Mike Vickers =

English musician (born 1940)

- Born: Michael Graham Vickers; 18 April 1940 (age 86); Staines-upon-Thames, England
- Occupations: Musician
- Instruments: Guitar; flute; saxophone; Moog synthesizer
- Formerly of: Manfred Mann; The Manfreds

Michael Graham Vickers (born 18 April 1940) is an English musician who came to prominence as the guitarist, flautist, and saxophonist with the 1960s band Manfred Mann.

== Early life ==
Vickers was born in Staines-upon-Thames, Surrey. At the age of seven, his family moved to Scotland, and when he was eleven, to Southampton, where he attended King Edward VI School.

== Career ==
=== Manfred Mann ===
Vickers originally played flute and saxophone, but with the increasing popularity of guitars in bands, it was decided that Manfred Mann should have a guitarist in their lineup. Vickers volunteered for this role, though he always preferred playing woodwind. His tough flute soloing on hard blues tracks, such as "Without You", prefigured the work of Ian Anderson with Jethro Tull five years later. As the group were all multi-instrumentalists, multi-tracking was used to allow Vickers to perform on guitar and woodwind on the same recordings, while drummer Mike Hugg similarly doubled on vibraphone.

He was credited as a co-writer on Manfred Mann's early hit singles and contributed a few tracks to albums, including "The Abominable Snowmann" and "You're for Me". In 1965, his bandmate Tom McGuinness described him as "the nicest one of the group...nice nearly all the time. But when he's nasty he just can't be nice about it." McGuinness added: "He collects saxophones – which we buy for him."

By 1965, according to McGuinness, Vickers was already "recording with his own orchestra and looks like becoming a definite threat to Semprini".

=== Solo ===
At the end of 1965, Vickers quit Manfred Mann, although his first solo album, I Wish I Were a Group Again, did not appear until 1968. In June 1967, Vickers conducted the orchestra for the live recording of the Beatles' "All You Need Is Love", which was shown on live TV across the world when communications satellite technology was celebrated by a worldwide linkup.

Vickers continued as a composer and arranger for records, television shows, and films. He composed "Pegasus", the theme from the cult ITV series The Adventures of Don Quick in 1970. One of his most familiar TV compositions is "Jet Set", which was used as the theme music for the NBC game show Jackpot in 1974–75, and as opening music for the sports series This Week in Baseball from 1977, until the programme's end in 2011. However, he did not write TWIB's iconic closing theme, "Gathering Crowds"; that was written by John Scott. His film work includes the scores to The Sandwich Man (1966), Press for Time (1966), My Lover, My Son (1970), Please Sir! (1971), Dracula A.D. 1972 (1972), The Sex Thief (1973), and the fantasy films At the Earth's Core (1976) and Warlords of Atlantis (1978).

In 1977, Vickers scored a UK chart hit under his own name, when Kenny Everett used his track "Retribution" as music for the Captain Kremmen cartoon segments on his television show, which became the single "Captain Kremmen (Retribution)". The track reached number 32 on the charts, and the duo appeared on Top of the Pops in November.

Vickers was an early user of the Moog synthesizer and found work outside his usual composing and arranging jobs as a programmer and performer of Moog equipment in the late 1960s, including teaching the Beatles how to use the Moog during recording sessions for the Abbey Road album.

He also founded the Baker Street Philharmonic, releasing singles, EPs, and four albums between 1969 and 1972. His instrumental piece "Visitation", composed and recorded in 1971, was used in the Polish television science series Sonda, broadcast between 1977 and 1989.

=== The Manfreds ===
From 1992 to 1999, Vickers was a member of the Manfreds, an amalgamation of 1960s Manfred Mann members and associates that featured both Paul Jones and his successor, Mike d'Abo, on vocals, the latter also playing keyboards. Vickers played only woodwind instruments—alto saxophone, flute, and occasionally recorder—in this ensemble. In some of the later hits, such as "Semi-Detached, Suburban Mr. James", he reproduced woodwind parts that had been performed on the original studio versions by his successor in Manfred Mann, Klaus Voormann.

== Discography ==
=== with Manfred Mann ===
- The Five Faces of Manfred Mann (1964)
- The Manfred Mann Album (1964)
- My Little Red Book of Winners! (1965)
- Mann Made (1965)

=== Solo ===
- Wish I Were a Group Again (1968)

=== with the Manfreds ===
- 5-4-3-2-1 (1998)
- Live (1999)
