= John Burgess (music producer) =

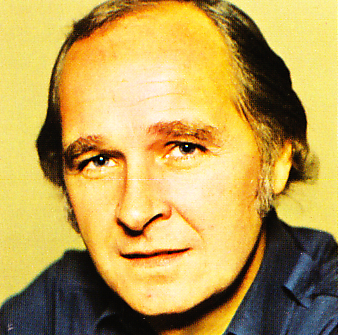
- Burgess at AIR Studios

Background information
- Born: John Edward Burgess; 8 March 1932; London, England
- Died: 13 March 2014 (aged 82) England
- Genres: Pop
- Occupation: Record producer
- Years active: 1950s–1980s

John Edward Burgess (8 March 1932 – 13 March 2014) was a British record producer and production company executive. In the 1960s, he produced hit records by Adam Faith, Freddie and the Dreamers, Manfred Mann, and many other acts of the early era of the British Invasion.

== Career ==
=== 1950s ===
Born in London, Burgess started working in the promotion and publicity section of EMI in 1951. When the company took over Capitol Records, he was responsible for promoting its artists including Frank Sinatra, Peggy Lee and Dean Martin. By the mid-1950s, he had become assistant to record producer Norman Newell.

In 1959, as Newell was unavailable for the recording session, Burgess was given responsibility for producing then-unknown Adam Faith's fourth single, "What Do You Want?". Arranged by John Barry, it rose to number one on the UK Singles Chart for three weeks in December 1959. The record company wished to stick to a successful formula, and so Burgess was retained as producer for Faith's follow-up record, "Poor Me", also a number one UK hit, and then for subsequent releases by the singer until the mid-1960s.

=== 1960s ===
He produced many of the recordings by the John Barry Seven, including their hit single "The James Bond Theme" in 1962.

From 1963, Burgess produced a series of UK hits by Freddie and the Dreamers, including "If You Gotta Make a Fool of Somebody" and "I'm Telling You Now", which hit number one on the American Billboard Hot 100 in 1965. Burgess was also impressed by a jazz and R&B-influenced band known variously as the Mann-Hugg Blues Brothers or the Manfreds. Changing the band's name to that of their leader, Manfred Mann, Burgess produced their early UK hits including "5-4-3-2-1", "Do Wah Diddy Diddy", and "Pretty Flamingo". He turned down the opportunity to record The High Numbers (later The Who), but produced hit records by Peter and Gordon, David and Jonathan, Cliff Bennett and the Rebel Rousers, Paul Jones, Matt Monro, The Congregation, The Pipkins, and early singles by The Sweet. Burgess also produced albums of the musicals Barnum and Guys and Dolls.

In 1965, together with George Martin and Ron Richards of EMI, and Peter Sullivan of Decca, he helped set up Associated Independent Recording (AIR), one of the earliest independent record production companies.

=== 1970s ===
From 1969, he was the managing director of AIR Studios in London, and, in 1979, became the managing director of AIR Studios in Montserrat, in the West Indies.

== Death ==
Burgess died in March 2014, aged 82.
