= Glay discography =

Discography for the Japanese band GLAY

The discography of Japanese pop rock band Glay consists of 17 studio albums, 42 unique singles, 27 video albums, and 64 songs associated with various promotions.

== Discography ==
All sales numbers are obtained from Oricon charts.

=== Albums ===
| Album # | Album information | Album track list |
|---|---|---|
| 1st | Hai to Diamond (灰とダイヤモンド): Released: 05-25-1994 (re-released: 09-13-2000); Label: Extasy Records; Highest oricon position (weekly): #57; Weeks on chart: 12; Sales: 51,370 | 01. Manatsu no Tobira (Glay Version); 02. Kanojo no "Modern..."; 03. Kissin' Noise; 04. Hidoku Arifureta White Noise wo Kure; 05. Rain (Glay Version); 06. Lady Close; 07. Two Bell Silence; 08. Sen no Knife ga Mune wo Sasu; 09. Burst; 10. If: Hai to Diamond |
| 2nd | Speed Pop: Released: 03-01-1995; Label: Platinum Records; Highest oricon position (weekly): #8; Weeks on chart: 51; Sales: 320,150 | 01. Speed Pop (Introduction); 02. Happy Swing; 03. Kanojo no "Modern..."; 04. Zutto Futari de...; 05. Love Slave; 06. Regret; 07. Innocence; 08. Freeze My Love; 09. Manatsu no Tobira; 10. Life: Touii Kara no Shita de 11. Junk Art; 12. Rain |
| 3rd | Beat Out!: Released: 02-07-1996; Label: Platinum Records; Highest oricon position (weekly): #1; Weeks on chart: 83; Sales: 821,890 | 01. More Than Love; 02. Yes, Summerdays; 03. Genshoku no Sora; 04. Trouble on Monday; 05. Together; 06. Tsuki ni Inoru; 07. Ikiteku Tsuyosa; 08. Shuumatsu no Baby Talk; 09. Glorious; 10. Kisaki no Hate; 11. Miki Piano |
| 4th | Beloved: Released: 11-18-1996; Label: Platinum Records; Highest oricon position (weekly): #1; Weeks on chart: 89; Sales: 1,522,540 | 01. Groovy Tour; 02. Lovers Change Fighters, Cool; 03. Beloved; 04. Shutter Speed No Theme; 05. Fairy Story; 06. Kanariya; 07. Hit the World Chart!; 08. A Boy: Zutto Wasurenai; 09. Haru wo Aisuru Hito; 10. Curtain Call; 11. Miyako Wasure; 12. Rhapsody |
| 5th | Pure Soul: Released: 07-29-1998; Label: Unlimited Records / Mustard; Highest oricon position (weekly): #1; Weeks on chart: 41; Sales: 2,427,010 | 01. You May Dream; 02. Biribiri Crashmen; 03. May Fair; 04. Soul Love; 05. Deatte Shimatta Futari; 06. Pure Soul; 07. Yuuwaku; 08. Come On!!; 09. Friedchicken & Beer; 10. 3 Nen Go; 11. I'm in Love |
| 6th | Heavy Gauge: Released: 10-20-1999; Label: Unlimited Records / Mustard; Highest oricon position (weekly): #1; Weeks on chart: 19; Sales: 2,366,000 | 01. Heavy Gauge; 02. Fatsounds; 03. Survival; 04. Kokodewanai, Dokoka e 05. Happiness; 06. Summer FM; 07. Level Devil; 08. Be with You; 09. Winter, Again; 10. Will Be King; 11. Ikigai; 12. Savile Row 3 Banchi |
| 7th | One Love: Released: 11-28-2001; Label: Unlimited Records / Mustard; Highest oricon position (weekly): #1; Weeks on chart: 11; Sales: 661,460 | 01. All Standard Is You; 02. Wet Dream; 03. Shitto (Kurid/Phantom mix); 04. Highway No. 5; 05. Fighting Spirit; 06. Hitohira no Jiyuu (Johnny's peace mix); 07. Think ABout My Daughter; 08. Viva Viva Viva; 09. Prize; 10. Mermaid; 11. Mister Popcorn; 12. Denki Iruka Kimyou na Shikou; 13. Stay Tuned; 14. Kimi ga Mitsumeta Umi; 15. Muyuu Byou; 16. Christmas Ring; 17. Global Communication; 18. One Love: All Standard Is You Reprise |
| 8th | Unity Roots and Family, Away: Released: 09-19-2002; Label: Unlimited Records / Mustard; Highest oricon position (weekly): #1; Weeks on chart: 16; Sales: 436,179 | 01. We All Feel His Strength of Tender; 02. Mata Kokode Aimashou; 03. Girlish Moon; 04. Way of Difference; 05. Koukai; 06. Yuruginai Monotachi; 07. Natsu no Kanata e (Johny the Unity mix); 08. Neverland; 09. Karera no Holy X'mas; 10. Father & Son; 11. Sotsugyou Made, Ato Sukoshi; 12. Friend of Mine; 13. All Standard Is You: End Roll |
| 9th | The Frustrated: Released: 03-24-2004; Label: Unlimited Records / Mustard; Highest oricon position (weekly): #2; Weeks on chart: 15; Sales: 241,485 | 01. HighCommunications; 02. The Frustrated; 03. All I Want; 04. Beautiful Dreamer; 05. Blast; 06. Ano Natsu Kara Ichiban Tooi Basho; 07. Mugen no déjà vu Kara; 08. Toki no Shizuku; 09. Billionaire Champagne Miles Away; 10. Coyote, Colored Darkness; 11. Bugs in My Head; 12. Runaway Runaway; 13. Street Life; 14. Minamigochi |
| 10th | Love Is Beautiful: Released: 01-31-2007; Label: Toshiba EMI / Capitol Records; Highest oricon position (weekly): #1; Weeks on chart: 9; Sales: 193,526 | 01. Rock'N'Roll Swindle; 02. Henna Yume: Thousand Dreams; 03. 100 Mankai no Kiss; 04. Natsuoto; 05. American Innovation; 06. Answer; 07. Bokutachi no Shouhai; 08. Saragi no Tou; 09. World's End; 10. Scream; 11. Koi; 12. I Will; 13. Layla; 14. Mirror |
| 11th | Glay: Released: 10-13-2010; Label: For Life Music / Lover Soul Music & Associates; Highest oricon position (weekly): #1; Weeks on chart: 14; Sales: 125,081 | 01. Shikina; 02. Kegarenaki Season; 03. Wasted Time; 04. Haruka; 05. Apologize; 06. Tsuki no Yoru ni 07. Kaze no Hitori; 08. Precious; 09. Satellite of Love; 10. Chelsea |
| 12th | Justice: Released: 01-23-2013; Label: Pony Canyon / Lover Soul Music & Associates; Highest oricon position (weekly): #1; Weeks on chart: 11; Sales: 73,925 | 01. Who Killed Ny Diva; 02. Route 5 Bayshore Line; 03. Paradise Lost; 04. Love Impossible; 05. Mahiru no Tsuki no Shizukesa ni 06. Gestalt; 07. Justice [from] Guilty; 08. Kizu Darake no Taiyou; 09. Unmeiron; 10. Smile |
| 13th | Guilty: Released: 01-23-2013; Label: Pony Canyon / Lover Soul Music & Associates; Highest oricon position (weekly): #2; Weeks on chart: 10; Sales: 72,473 | 01. Red Moon & Silver Sun ~ My Private "Jealousy"; 02. everKrack (album ver.); 03. Factory; 04. Fuyu no Yuhodou; 05. Hana yo Arashi yo 06. Kiri no Naka (album ver.); 07.Hatsukoi wo Utae; 08. Bible; 09. Ruby's Blanket; 10. Kimi ni Aetara |
| 13th | Music Life: Released: 11-05-2014; Label: Pony Canyon / Lover Soul Music & Associates; Highest oricon position (weekly): #2; Weeks on chart: 20; Sales: 89,923 | 1. "Bleeze"; 2. "Hyakka Ryoran"; 3. "Only Yesterday"; 4. "Hashire! Mirai"; 5. "Matsuri no Ato"; 6. "Uwaki na Kiss Me Girl"; 7. "Mousou Collector"; 8. "Hospital pm9" 9. "Dark River"; 10. "Till Kingdom Come"; 11. "Music Life" |
| 14th | Summerdelics: Released: 07-12-2017; Label: Pony Canyon; Highest Oricon position (weekly): #1; Weeks on chart: 22; Sales: 71,372 | 1. "Sin Zombie"; 2. "Binetsu Agirl Summer"; 3. "XYZ"; 4. "Chou Onsoku Destiny"; 5. "Long Run"; 6. "The Other End of the Globe"; 7. "Deathtopia"; 8. "Heroes"; 9. "Summerdelics"; 10. "Sora ga Aozora de Aru Tame ni" 11. "Scoop"; 12. "Seija no Inai Machi"; 13. "Supernova Express 2017"; 14. "Lifetime" |
| 15th | No Democracy: Released: 02-10-2019; Label: Pony Canyon; Highest Oricon position (weekly): #2; Sales: 39,153 | 1. REIWADEMOCRACY; 2. Hansei no iro nashi 3. My name is DATURA; 4. Flowers Gone; 5. Koori no tsubasa 6. Daremoga tokubetsudatta koro 7. Ah, mujou 8. Senka no ko 9. JUST FINE; 10. Hajimari no uta 11. Anata to ikite yuku 12. COLORS; 13. Urei no Prisoner; 14. Gengou |
| 16th | Freedom Only: Released: 06-10-2021; Label: Pony Canyon; Highest Oricon position (weekly): #1; Sales: 30,738 | |
| 17th | Back to the Pops: Released: 10-09-2024; Label: Pony Canyon; Highest Oricon position (weekly): #1; Sales: 25,773 | |
| 18th | Tabisuru Riyū wo Machinagara (旅する理由を待ちながら): Released: 10-21-2026; Label: Pony Canyon; Highest Oricon position (weekly): #4; Sales: 24,667 | |

=== Compilations, etc. ===
| Album # | Album information | Album track list |
|---|---|---|
| 1st | Review: Released: 10-01-1997; Label: Platinum Records; Highest oricon position (weekly): #1; Weeks on chart: 106; Sales: 4,875,980 | 01. Glorious; 02. Kanojo no "Modern..."; 03. Beloved; 04. More Than Love; 05. Sen no Knife ga Mune wo Sasu; 06. Zutto Futari de...; 07. Kuchibiru; 08. Rhapsody; 09. However; 10. Freeze My Love; 11. Kissin' Noise; 12. Kiseki no Hate |
| 2nd | Glay Song Book: Released: 02-25-1998; Label: Platinum Records; Highest oricon position (weekly): ?; Weeks on chart: ?; Sales: ? | 01. Tsuki ni Inoru #1; 02. Freeze My Love (orchestra); 03. Haru wo Ai Suru Hito (orchestra); 04. However (Kaisou no Theme); 05. Miyako Wasure (orchestra); 06. Yes, Summerdays (orchestra); 07. Innocence (orchestra); 08. Tsuki no Inoru #2; 09. However (orchestra); 10. Trouble On Monday (orchestra); 11. Miki Piano (Wakare no Theme); 12. Tsuki ni Inoru (orchestra) |
| 3rd | "Mirai Nikki" Original Sound Track: Released: 09-06-2000; Label: ?; Highest oricon position (weekly): ?; Weeks on chart: ?; Sales: ? | 01. Mirai Nikki; 02. Special Thanks: Piano Version; 03. Natsu no Kanata e ~ Vocal Version; 04. Prayer; 05. Whenever You Smile; 06. Ikiteku Tsuyosa: Instre'Arrnge Version; 07. Tomadoi: Summer Days; 08. Eve; 09. Far Away; 10. Obey; 11. Tomadoi: Strings Version; 12. Natsu no Kanata e: Slide Guitar Version; 13. Special Thanks: Strings Version |
| 4th | Drive: Glay Complete Best: Released: 11-29-2000; Label: Unlimited Records / Mustard; Highest oricon position (weekly): #1; Weeks on chart: 23; Sales: 2,637,420 | Disc 1; 01. Tomadoi (Jet the Phantom); 02. Kuchibiru; 03. Shutter Speeds No Theme; 04. Zutto Futari de...: 05. Glorious; 06. A Boy: Zutto Wasurenai; 07. Ikiteku Tsuyosa; 08. Happy Swing; 09. Kanojo no "Modern..."; 10. Soul Love; 11. However; 12. I'm in Love; Disc2; 01. Yuuwaku; 02. Ikigai; 03. Biribiri Crashmen; 04. Beloved; 05. Happiness; 06. Survival; 07. Pure Soul; 08. Be with You; 09. Winter, Again; 10. Haru wo Ai Suru Hito; 11. Special Thanks; 12. Missing You (New Single) |
| 5th | Flow of Soul Vol. 1: Takuro Meets Vanessa-Mae: Released: 04-24-2002; Label: Unlimited Records; Highest oricon position (weekly): ?; Weeks on chart: ?; Sales: ? | 01. Way of Difference; 02. Francis Elena (featuring Vanessa-Mae); 03. Zutto Futari de...; 04. Glorious; 05. A Boy: Zutto Wasurenai; 06. Kanojo no "Modern..."; 07. However; 08. I'm in Love; 09. Yuuwaku; 10. Biribiri Crashmen; 11. Sen no Knife ga Mune wo Sasu; 12. Pure Soul |
| 6th | Glay Rare Collectives Vol. 1: Released: 02-05-2003; Label: Unlimited Records / Mustard; Highest oricon position (weekly): #3; Weeks on chart: 11; Sales: 258,225 | Disc 1; 01. Life: Touii Sora no Shita de 02. Innocence; 03. Regret; 04. Gone with the Wind; 05. Acid Head; 06. Believe in Fate; 07. Together (new version with orchestra); 08. Haru wo Ai Suru Hito; 09. I'm Yours; 10. Little Lovebirds; 11. Doku Rock; 12. Strawberry Shake; 13. It's Dying It's Not Dying; 14. Shiwase ni Naru, Sono Toki ni. Disc2; 01. Innocence (Live Version); 02. Mitsumeteitai; 03. Survival (Live Version); 04. Misery; 05. Misery (Glay Expo '99; Survival Live Version); 06. Kokodewanai, Dokoka e (Glay Expo '99 Survival Live Version); 07. Hitohira no Jiyuu (Glay Expo 2001 "Gloval; Communication" in Kyushu Version) |
| 7th | Glay Rare Collectives Vol. 2: Released: 02-05-2003; Label: Unlimited Records / Mustard; Highest oricon position (weekly): #2; Weeks on chart: 11; Sales: 264,710 | Disc 1; 01. Young oh!oh!: 02. Hello My Life; 03. Summer FM; 04. Rock Icon; 05. Good Bye Bye Sunday; 06. Time; 07. Why Don't We Make You Happy; 08. Good Morning N.Y.C; 09. Back Up; 10. Super Ball 425; 11. Sotsugyou Made, Ato Sukoshi; 12. Brothel Creepers; 13. Itsuka; Disc2; 01. 17bars (Instrumental); 02. Cynical; 03. Neuromancer; 04. Ai; 05. Surf Rider; 06. Giant Strong Faust Super Star; 07. 17ans 08. I'm Yours (Knightmare mix'99); 09. Dosanko Shiisaa |
| 8th | Ballad Best Singles: White Road: Released: 01-19-2005; Label: Toshiba EMI; Highest oricon position (weekly): #1; Weeks on chart: 14; Sales: 411,521 | 01. White Road; 02. Way of Difference; 03. Soul Love; 04. Beloved; 05. Special Thanks; 06. Blue Jean; 07. Aitai Kimochi; 08. A Boy: Zutto Wasurenai; 09. However; 10. Zutto Futari de...; 11. Be with You; 12. Winter, Again; 13. Toki no Shizuku; 14. Tsuzureori: So Far and Yet So Close |
| 9th | The Great Vacation Vol. 1: Super Best of Glay: Released: 06-10-2009; Label: EMI Music Japan / Capitol Records; Highest oricon position (weekly): #2; Weeks on chart: 21; Sales: 194,709 | Disc 1; 01. Yuuwaku; 02. Mermaid; 03. Missing You; 04. GloBal Communications; 05. Stay Tuned; 06. Hitohira no Jiyuu; 07. Way of Difference; 08. Mata Koko de Aimashou; 09. Aitai Kimochi; 10. Itsuka; 11. Beautiful Dreamer; 12. Street Life; 13. Toki no Shizuku; 14. Tenshi no Wakemae; 15. Peak Hateshinaku Soul Kagirinaku; Disc2; 01. Blue Jean (Jet the Phantom Mix); 02. White Road; 03. Scream (Glay x Exile); 04. Rock'N'Roll Swindle; 05. Layla; 06. Answer (Glay feat. Kyosuke Himuro); 07. Natsuoto; 08. Henna Yume: Thousand Dreams; 09. 100 Mankai no Kiss; 10. Mirror; 11. Kodou; 12. Bokutachi no Shouhai; 13. Sorry Love; 14. aka to kuro no Matadora; 15. Harumadewa; Disc3; 01. Burning Chrome; 02. Ashes-1969-: 03. Verb; 04. Laotour: Furueru Kobushi ga Tsukamu Mono; 05. The Birthday Girl; 06. I Love Youi wo sagashiteru 07. Itsuka no Natsu ni Mimi wo Sumaseba; 08. No Escape; 09. Synchronicity; 10. I Am xxx 11. Run; 12. Say Your Dream; 13. Rhythm |
| 10th | The Great Vacation Vol. 2: Super Best of Glay: Released: 10-21-2009; Label: EMI Music Japan / Capitol Records; Highest oricon position (weekly): #1; Weeks on chart: 18; Sales: 189,038 | Disc 1; 01. Rain; 02. Manatsu no Tobira; 03. Kanojo no "Modern..."; 04. Freeze My Love; 05. Zutto Futari de...: 06. Gone with the Wind; 07. Yes, Summerdays; 08. Ikiteku Tsuyosa; 09. Glorious; 10. Beloved; 11. A Boy: Zutto Wasurenai; 12. Curtain Call; 13. Haru wo Aisuru Hito; 14. Kuchibiru; 15. However; Disc2; 01. Yuuwaku; 02. Soul Love; 03. Pure Soul; 04. I'm in Love; 05. Be with You; 06. Winter, Again; 07. Survival; 08. Kokodewanai, Dokoka e 09. Happiness: Winter Mix; 10. Tomadoi; 11. Special Thanks; 12. Goran, Sekai wa Kurusimi ni Michite Iruyo; 13. Two Bell Silence; 14. Shutter Speed No Theme; 15. Acid Head; 16. Burst; Disc3; 01. Great Vacation; 02. Fame Is Dead; 03. Absolute "Zero"; 04. RainbirD; 05. Let Me Be; 06. Black Eyes She Had; 07. Tokyo Vice Terror; 08. 1988; 09. Ruca; 10. Omae to Tomo ni Aru; 11. Real Shadow |
| 11th | Review II ～Best of Glay～: Released: March 11, 2020; Label: Pony Canyon; Highest Oricon position (weekly): #1; Sales: 64,106 | |

=== Singles ===
| Single # | Single information | Album track list |
|---|---|---|
| 1st | Rain: Released: 05-25-1994; Label: Platinum Records; Highest oricon position (weekly): #26; Weeks on chart: 11; Sales: 100,990 | 01. Rain; 02. Rain (Instrumental) |
| 2nd | Manatsu no Tobira (真夏の扉): Released: 06-15-1994; Label: Platinum Records; Highest oricon position (weekly): #24; Weeks on chart: 5; Sales: 42,940 | 01. Manatsu no Tobira; 02. Life: Touii Sora no Shita de |
| 3rd | Kanojo no "Modern..." (彼女の"Modern・・・"): Released: 11-16-1994; Label: Platinum Records; Highest oricon position (weekly): #45; Weeks on chart: 4; Sales: 20,600 | 01. Kanojo no "Modern..."; 02. Innocence; 03. Kanojo no "Modern..." (Instrumental) |
| 4th | Freeze My Love: Released: 01-25-1995; Label: Platinum Records; Highest oricon position (weekly): #19; Weeks on chart: 5; Sales: 71,850 | 01. Freeze My Love; 02. Regret; 03. Freeze My Love (Instrumental) |
| 5th | Zutto Futari de... (ずっと2人で・・・): Released: 05-17-1995; Label: Platinum Records; Highest oricon position (weekly): #34; Weeks on chart: 5; Sales: 39,860 | 01. Zutto Futari de...; 02. Gone With the Wind; 03. Acid Head |
| 6th | Yes, Summerdays: Released: 08-09-1995; Label: Platinum Records; Highest oricon position (weekly): #13; Weeks on chart: 10; Sales: 232,300 | 01. Yes, Summerdays; 02. Innocence; 03. Yes, Summerdays (Original Karaoke) |
| 7th | Ikiteku Tsuyosa (生きてく強さ): Released: 11-08-1995; Label: Platinum Records; Highest oricon position (weekly): #19; Weeks on chart: 6; Sales: 90,810 | 01. Ikiteku Tsuyosa; 02. Cynical; 03. Ikiteku Tsuyosa (Original Karaoke) |
| 8th | Glorious (グロリアス): Released: 01-17-1996; Label: Platinum Records; Highest oricon position (weekly): #4; Weeks on chart: 14; Sales: 592,970 | 01. Glorious; 02. Believe in Fate; 03. Glorious (Original Karaoke) |
| 9th | Beloved: Released: 08-07-1996; Label: Platinum Records; Highest oricon position (weekly): #3; Weeks on chart: 24; Sales: 841,160 | 01. Beloved; 02. Together (New Version with Orchestra); 03. Beloved (Original Karaoke) |
| 10th | A Boy: Zutto Wasurenai (A Boy: ずっと忘れない): Released: 11-11-1996; Label: Platinum Records; Highest oricon position (weekly): #2; Weeks on chart: 13; Sales: 273,260 | 01. A Boy: Zutto Wasurenai; 02. Neuromancer; 03. A Boy: Zutto Wasurenai (Original Karaoke) |
| 11th | Kuchibiru (口唇): Released: 05-14-1997; Label: Platinum Records; Highest oricon position (weekly): #1; Weeks on chart: 20 times; Sales: 994,120 | 01. Kuchibiru; 02. Haru wo Ai Suru Hito; 03. Kuchibiru (Instrumental) |
| 12th | However: Released: 08-06-1997; Label: Platinum Records; Highest oricon position (weekly): #1; Weeks on chart: 34; Sales: 1,341,980 | 01. However; 02. I'm Yours; 03. However (Instrumental) |
| 13th | Yuuwaku (誘惑): Released: 04-29-1998; Label: Platinum Records; Highest oricon position (weekly): #1; Weeks on chart: 19; Sales: 1,625,520 | 01. Yuuwaku; 02. Little Lovebirds; 03. Yuuwaku (Instrumental) |
| 14th | Soul Love: Released: 04-29-1998; Label: Platinum Records; Highest oricon position (weekly): #2; Weeks on chart: 16; Sales: 1,371,750 | 01. Soul Love; 02. Ai; 03. Soul Love (Instrumental) |
| 15th | Be With You: Released: 11-25-1998; Label: Unlimited Records / Mustard; Highest oricon position (weekly): #1; Weeks on chart: 16; Sales: 1,173,180 | 01. Be With You; 02. Doku Rock; 03. Strawberry Shake: It's Dying It's Not Dying; 04. Be With You (Instrumental) |
| 16th | Winter, Again: Released: 02-03-1999; Label: Unlimited Records / Mustard; Highest oricon position (weekly): #1; Weeks on chart: 17; Sales: 1,642,530 | 01. Winter, Again; 02. Young Oh! Oh!; 03. Hello My Life; 04. Winter, Again (Instrumental) |
| 1st Video; Single | Survival (サバイバル): Released: 05-19-1999; Label: Unlimited Records / Mustard; Highest oricon position (weekly): #1; Weeks on chart: 14; Sales: 901,775 | 01. Survival (2.7-D Animation Version); 02. Survival (Live Version ('99.3.10 in Tokyo Dome)) |
| 17th | Kokodewanai, Dokoka e (ここではない、どこかへ): Released: 08-25-1999; Label: Unlimited Records / Mustard; Highest oricon position (weekly): #1; Weeks on chart: 10; Sales: 921,150 | 01. Kokodewanai, Dokoka e 02. Summer FM; 03. Kokodewanai, Dokoka e (Instrumental) |
| 18th | Happiness: Winter Mix: Released: 01-01-2000; Label: Unlimited Records / Mustard; Highest oricon position (weekly): #1; Weeks on chart: 8; Sales: 487,220 | 01. Happiness: Winter Mix; 02. Misery; (Glay Expo '99 Survival Live Version) (hide cover); 03. Kokodewanai, Dokoka e (Glay Expo '99 Survival Live Version); 04. Happiness: Winter Mix (Instrumental) |
| 19th | Mermaid: Released: 07-19-2000; Label: Unlimited Records / Mustard; Highest oricon position (weekly): #1; Weeks on chart: 10; Sales: 771,780 | 01. Mermaid; 02. Rock Icon; 03. Mermaid (Instrumental) |
| 20th | Tomadoi (とまどい) / Special Thanks: Released: 08-23-2000; Label: Unlimited Records / Mustard; Highest oricon position (weekly): #1; Weeks on chart: 9; Sales: 1,009,010 | 01. Tomadoi; 02. Special Thanks; 03. Good Bye Bye Sunday; 04. Tomadoi (Instrumental); 05. Special Thanks (Instrumental) |
| 21st | Missing You: Released: 11-15-2000; Label: Unlimited Records / Mustard; Highest oricon position (weekly): #1; Weeks on chart: 8; Sales: 548,460 | 01. Missing You; 02. Time; 03. Why Don't We Make You Happy; 04. Surf Rider; 05. Missing You (Instrumental) |
| 22nd | Gloval Communication: Released: 04-25-2001; Label: Unlimited Records / Mustard; Highest oricon position (weekly): #1; Weeks on chart: 8; Sales: 490,980 | 01. Gloval Communication; 02. Good Morning N.Y.C; 03. Global Communication (Let's Mimi Copy Version) |
| 23rd | Stay Tuned: Released: 07-04-2001; Label: Unlimited Records / Mustard; Highest oricon position (weekly): #2; Weeks on chart: 7; Sales: 384,460 | 01. Stay Tuned; 02. Back-Up; 03. Super Ball 425; 04. Stay Tuned (Guts! Mimi Copy Version) |
| 24th | Hitohira no Jiyuu (ひとひらの自由): Released: 09-19-2001; Label: Unlimited Records / Mustard; Highest oricon position (weekly): #1; Weeks on chart: 6; Sales: 352,930 | 01. Hitohira no Jiyuu; 02. Hitohira no Jiyuu: (Glay Expo 2001 "Global Communication"; In Kyushu Live Version) |
| 25th | Way of Difference: Released: 02-27-2002; Label: Unlimited Records / Mustard; Highest oricon position (weekly): #1; Weeks on chart: 12; Sales: 730,100 | 01. Way of Difference; 02. Sotsugyou Made, Ato Sukoshi; 03. Way of Difference: Instrumental |
| 26th | Mata Koko de Aimashou (またここであいましょう): Released: 07-24-2002; Label: Unlimited Records / Mustard; Highest oricon position (weekly): #2; Weeks on chart: 6; Sales: 255,840 | 01. Mata Koko de Aimashou; 02. Giant Strong Faust Super Star |
| 27th | Aitai Kimochi (逢いたい気持ち): Released: 07-31-2002; Label: Unlimited Records / Mustard; Highest oricon position (weekly): #2; Weeks on chart: 10; Sales: 278,350 | 01. Aitai Kimochi; 02. Brothel Creepers |
| 1st DVD; Single | Itsuka (いつか): Released: 03-05-2003; Label: Unlimited Records / Mustard; Highest oricon position (weekly): #2 (charted only on the DVD ranking); Weeks on chart: 5; Sales: 60,678 | Itsuka PV, Making of, Jiro Ver, Takuro Ver; Teru Ver, Hisashi Ver |
| 28th | Beautiful Dreamer / Street Life: Released: 10-16-2003; Label: Unlimited Records / Mustard; Highest oricon position (weekly): #1; Weeks on chart: 17; Sales: 188,819 | 01. Beautiful Dreamer; 02. Street Life; 03. Children in the War; (Live from High Communications 2003) |
| 29th | Toki no Shizuku (時の雫): Released: 01-28-2004; Label: Unlimited Records / Mustard; Highest oricon position (weekly): #1; Weeks on chart: 11; Sales: 186,407 | 01. Toki no Shizuku; 02. Soshite, Korekaramo; 03. However (Inspired by High Communications); 04. Toki no Shizuku (Radio Edit) |
| 30th | Tenshi no Wakemae (天使のわけまえ) / Peak Hateshinaku Soul Kagirinaku (ピーク果てしなくソウル限りなく): Released: 05-19-2004; Label: Unlimited Records / Mustard; Highest oricon position (weekly): #1; Weeks on chart: 19; Sales: 115,802 | 01. Tenshi no Wakemae; 02. Peak Hateshinaku Soul Kagirinaku; 03. Beautiful Dreamer (Live Version); 04. Toki no Shizuku: Overture |
| 30th | Tenshi no Wakemae (天使のわけまえ) / Peak Hateshinaku Soul Kagirinaku (ピーク果てしなくソウル限りなく); X-Rated/Area Edition Hokkaido (北海道): Released: 05-25-2004; Label: Unlimited Records / Mustard; Highest oricon position (weekly): #17; Weeks on chart: 4; Sales: 19,559 | 01. Tenshi no Wakemae; 02. Peak Hateshinaku Soul Kagirinaku; 03. Beautiful Dreamer (Live Version); 04. Coyote, Colored Darkness (Live Version) |
| 30th | Tenshi no Wakemae (天使のわけまえ) / Peak Hateshinaku Soul Kagirinaku (ピーク果てしなくソウル限りなく); X-Rated/Area Edition Tohoku (東北): Released: 05-25-2004; Label: Unlimited Records / Mustard; Highest oricon position (weekly): #21; Weeks on chart: 3; Sales: 17,636 | 01. Tenshi no Wakemae; 02. Peak Hateshinaku Soul Kagirinaku; 03. Runaway Runaway (Live Version); 04. The Frustrated (Live Version) |
| 30th | Tenshi no Wakemae (天使のわけまえ) / Peak Hateshinaku Soul Kagirinaku (ピーク果てしなくソウル限りなく); X-Rated/Area Edition Hokuriku (北陸): Released: 05-25-2004; Label: Unlimited Records / Mustard; Highest oricon position (weekly): #18; Weeks on chart: 3; Sales: 18,495 | 01. Tenshi no Wakemae; 02. Peak Hateshinaku Soul Kagirinaku; 03. Street Life (Live Version); 04. Minamigochi (Live Version) |
| 30th | Tenshi no Wakemae (天使のわけまえ) / Peak Hateshinaku Soul Kagirinaku (ピーク果てしなくソウル限りなく); X-Rated/Area Edition Kanto (関東): Released: 05-25-2004; Label: Unlimited Records / Mustard; Highest oricon position (weekly): #16; Weeks on chart: 4; Sales: 19,823 | 01. Tenshi no Wakemae; 02. Peak Hateshinaku Soul Kagirinaku; 03. Blast (Live Version); 04. Peak Hateshinaku Soul Kagirinaku (Live Version) |
| 30th | Tenshi no Wakemae (天使のわけまえ) / Peak Hateshinaku Soul Kagirinaku (ピーク果てしなくソウル限りなく); X-Rated/Area Edition Tokai (東海): Released: 05-25-2004; Label: Unlimited Records / Mustard; Highest oricon position (weekly): #22; Weeks on chart: 3; Sales: 16,492 | 01. Tenshi no Wakemae; 02. Peak Hateshinaku Soul Kagirinaku; 03. HighCommunications (Live Version); 04. All I Want (Live Version) |
| 30th | Tenshi no Wakemae (天使のわけまえ) / Peak Hateshinaku Soul Kagirinaku (ピーク果てしなくソウル限りなく); X-Rated/Area Edition Kansai (関西): Released: 05-25-2004; Label: Unlimited Records / Mustard; Highest oricon position (weekly): #15; Weeks on chart: 4; Sales: 20,282 | 01. Tenshi no Wakemae; 02. Peak Hateshinaku Soul Kagirinaku; 03. Bugs in My Head (Live Version); 04. Billionaire Champagne Miles Away (Live Version) |
| 30th | Tenshi no Wakemae (天使のわけまえ) / Peak Hateshinaku Soul Kagirinaku (ピーク果てしなくソウル限りなく); X-Rated/Area Edition Tsugoku (中国): Released: 05-25-2004; Label: Unlimited Records / Mustard; Highest oricon position (weekly): #27; Weeks on chart: 3; Sales: 13,757 | 01. Tenshi no Wakemae; 02. Peak Hateshinaku Soul Kagirinaku; 03. Ano Natsu Kara Ichiban Tooi Basho (Live Version); 04. Mugen no déjà vu Kara (Live Version) |
| 30th | Tenshi no Wakemae (天使のわけまえ) / Peak Hateshinaku Soul Kagirinaku (ピーク果てしなくソウル限りなく); X-Rated/Area Edition Kyushu (九州): Released: 05-25-2004; Label: Unlimited Records / Mustard; Highest oricon position (weekly): #26; Weeks on chart: 3; Sales: 15,382 | 01. Tenshi no Wakemae; 02. Peak Hateshinaku Soul Kagirinaku; 03. Tenshi no Wakemae (Live Version); 04. Toki no Shizuku (Live Version) |
| 31st | Blue Jean: Released: 08-04-2004; Label: Unlimited Records / Mustard; Highest oricon position (weekly): #1; Weeks on chart: 11; Sales: 162,529 | 01. Blue Jean; 02. Minamigochi: Peaceful Session; 03. Subete, Ai Datta: La vie d'une Petite Fille; 04. Subete, Ai Datta: La vie d'une Petite Fille (Acoustic Version); 04. Blue Jean (Instrumental) |
| 32nd | White Road (ホワイトロード): Released: 12-08-2004; Label: Unlimited Records / Mustard; Highest oricon position (weekly): #1; Weeks on chart: 7; Sales: 151,201 | 01. White Road; 02. Egao no Ooi hi Bakari Janai; 03. White Road (Instrumental) |
| Special; Project | Scream (Glay x Exile): Released: 06-20-2005; Label: Avex / Rhythm Zone; Highest oricon position (weekly): #1; Weeks on chart: 28; Sales: 545,098 | 01. Scream (Original Ver.) |
| 33rd | G4: Released: 07-12-2006; Label: Toshiba EMI / Capitol Records; Highest oricon position (weekly): #2; Weeks on chart: 10; Sales: 179,912 | 01. Rock'N'Roll Swindle; 02. Darekano Tameni Ikiru; 03. Koi; 04. Layla |
| Special; Project | Answer (Glay feat. Kyosuke Himuro): Released: 08-02-2006; Label: Toshiba EMI; Highest oricon position (weekly): #2; Weeks on chart: 12; Sales: 208,398 | 01. Answer |
| 34th | Natsuoto (夏音) / Henna Yume: Thousand Dreams (変な夢: Thousand Dreams): Released: 09-13-2006; Label: Toshiba EMI / Capitol Records; Highest oricon position (weekly): #1; Weeks on chart: 10; Sales: 151,115 | 01. Natusoto; 02. Henna Yume: Thousand Dreams; 03. Lock on You |
| 35th | 100 Mankai no Kiss (100万回のKiss): Released: 01-17-2007; Label: Toshiba EMI / Capitol Records; Highest oricon position (weekly): #1; Weeks on chart: 7; Sales: 173,724 | 01. 100 Mankai no Kiss; 02. Lone Wolf; 03. 100 Mankai no Kiss (Instrumental) |
| 36th | Kodou (鼓動): Released: 04-04-2007; Label: Toshiba EMI / Capitol Records; Highest oricon position (weekly): #1; Weeks on chart: 7; Sales: 94,465 | 01. Kodou; 02. Bokutachi no Shouhai; 03. Toge |
| 37th | Ashes. EP: Released: 10-31-2007; Label: EMI Music Japan / Capitol Records; Highest oricon position (weekly): #2; Weeks on chart: 8; Sales: 102,578 | 01. Ashes: 1969; 02. Rosy; 03. Sorry Love; 04. Mother Nature's Son (The Beatles cover) |
| 38th | Verb: Released: 06-11-2008; Label: EMI Music Japan / Capitol Records; Highest oricon position (weekly): #1; Weeks on chart: 10; Sales: 122,088; Highest Billboard Japan Hot 100 position: #1 | 1. (CD+DVD Limited Edition); 01. Verb; 02.Venus; 03. With or Without You (U2 cover); 2. (Regular Edition); 01. Verb; 02. Starless Night; 03. With or Without You (U2 cover) |
| 39th | Aka to Kuro no Matadora (紅と黒のMatadora) / I Love You wo Sagashiteru (I Love Youをさがしてる): Released: 09-10-2008; Label: EMI Music Japan / Capitol Records; Highest oricon position (weekly): #2; Weeks on chart: 8; Sales: 87,572; Highest Billboard Japan Hot 100 position: #2 (aka to kuro no Matadora), #37 (I Love You wo Sagashiteru) | 01. Aka to Kuro no Matadora; 02. I Love You wo Sagashiteru; 03. Suffragette City (David Bowie cover) |
| 40th | Say Your Dream: Released: 03-04-2009; Label: EMI Music Japan / Capitol Records; Highest oricon position (weekly): #2; Weeks on chart: 13; Sales: 101,422; Highest Billboard Japan Hot 100 position: #3 (Haru made wa), #57 (Say Your Dream) | 01. Chronos; 02. Say Your Dream; 03. Harumadewa; 04. Say Your Dream (Instrumental); 05. Harumadewa (Instrumental); 06. The Meaning of Life (The Offspring cover) |
| 41st | I Am XXX: Released: 05-25-2009; Label: EMI Music Japan / Capitol Records; Highest oricon position (weekly): #2; Weeks on chart: 8; Sales: 90,050; Highest Billboard Japan Hot 100 position: #4 | 01. I Am XXX; 02. Fuyu no Etoranjie (The Great Vacation Extra Live ver.); 03. I Am XXX (Instrumental); 04. The Great Vacation Vol.1 (Trailer) |
| 42nd | Precious: Released: 09-08-2010; Label: For Life Music / Lover Soul Music & Associates; Highest oricon position (weekly): #2; Weeks on chart: 8; Sales: 78,185; Highest Billboard Japan Hot 100 position: #3 | 01. Precious; 02. Heart Snow -Kokoro ni Furu Yuki-; 03. Kanojo no "Modern..." (Re-recorded); 04. 10th Album [GLAY] (Trailer) |
| 43rd | G4 II -THE RED MOON-: Released: 10-05-2011; Label: Lover Soul Music & Associates; Sales: -; Highest Billboard Japan Hot 100 position: #81 (everKrack) | 01. everKrack; 02. Kiri no Naka; 03. MAD BREAKER; 04. Ruby's Blanket |
| 44th | My Private "Jealousy": Released: 11-16-2011; Label: For Life Music / Lover Soul Music & Associates; Highest oricon position (weekly): #6; Weeks on chart: 8; Sales: 59,213; Highest Billboard Japan Hot 100 position: #7 | 01. My Private "Jealousy"; 02. Snow Flake; 03. Zankoku na tenshi no tēze (We ♥ Happy Swing Live ver.) |
| 45th | Bible: Released: 05-23-2012; Label: For Life Music / Lover Soul Music & Associates; Highest oricon position (weekly): #3; Weeks on chart: 11; Sales: 60,362; Highest Billboard Japan Hot 100 position: #6 | 01. Bible; 02. Ano Hi no Shounen; 03. Thank you for your love |
| 46th | Justice [from] Guilty: Released: 12-05-2012; Label: Pony Canyon / Lover Soul Music & Associates; Highest oricon position (weekly): #3; Weeks on chart: 8; Sales: 52,840; Highest Billboard Japan Hot 100 position: #5 | 01. Justice [from] Guilty; 02. Milestone: Mune Ippai no Yūutsu; 03. Time for Christmas (Club mix); 04. 11th Album [JUSTICE] & 12th Album [GUILTY] (Trailer) |
| 47th | Unmeiron (運命論): Released: 12-05-2012; Label: Pony Canyon / Lover Soul Music & Associates; Highest oricon position (weekly): #4; Weeks on chart: 8; Sales: 52,394; Highest Billboard Japan Hot 100 position: #3 | 01. Unmeiron; 02. 4 Roses; 03. Route 5 Bayshore Line; 04. 11th Album [JUSTICE] & 12th Album [GUILTY] (Trailer) |
| 48th | Dark River / Eternally / Tokei (時計): Released: 07-24-2013; Label: Pony Canyon / Lover Soul Music & Associates; Highest oricon position (weekly): #4; Weeks on chart: 9; Sales: 53,565; Highest Billboard Japan Hot 100 position: #4 (Dark River) | 01. Dark River; 02. Eternally; 03. Tokei |
| 49th | Diamond Skin / Niji no Pocket (虹のポケット) / Crazy Dance: Released: 11-27-2013; Label: Pony Canyon / Lover Soul Music & Associates; Highest oricon position (weekly): #4; Weeks on chart: 9; Sales: 45,109; Highest Billboard Japan Hot 100 position: #7 (Diamond Skin) | 01. Diamond Skin; 02. Niji no Pocket; 03. Crazy Dance |
| 50th | Bleeze -G4 III-: Released: 07-09-2014; Label: Pony Canyon / Lover Soul Music & Associates; Highest oricon position (weekly): #4; Weeks on chart: 11; Sales: 59,160; Highest Billboard Japan Hot 100 position: #4 | 01. Bleeze; 02. Waitan Sapphire; 03. Kuroku Nure!; 04. You |
| 51st | Hyakka Ryoran (百花繚乱) / Hashire! Mirai (疾走れ! ミライ): Released: 10-15-2014; Label: Pony Canyon / Lover Soul Music & Associates; Highest oricon position (weekly): #6; Weeks on chart: 7; Sales: 43,795; Highest Billboard Japan Hot 100 position: #9 (Hyakka Ryoran), #26 (Hashire! Mirai) | 01. Hyakka Ryoran; 02. Hashire! Mirai; 03. Bleeze (Studio Session Ver.); 04. Waitan Sapphire (Studio Session Ver.); 05. Kuroku Nure! (Studio Session Ver.); 06. You (Studio Session Ver.); 07. 13th Album [MUSIC LIFE] (Trailer) |
| 52nd | Heroes / Binetsu Agirl Summer (微熱Ⓐgirlサマー) / Tsuzureori: So Far and Yet So Close (つづれ織り ～so far and yet so close～): Released: 05-25-2015; Label: Pony Canyon / Lover Soul Music & Associates; Highest oricon position (weekly): #5; Weeks on chart: 9; Sales: 49,026; Highest Billboard Japan Hot 100 position: #11 (Heroes) | 01. Heroes; 02. Binetsu Agirl Summer; 03. Tsuzureori: So Far and Yet So Close (Live from Miracle Music Hunt 2014-2015); 04. Album [MUSIC LIFE] Reprise |
| 53rd | G4 IV: Released: 01-27-2016; Label: Pony Canyon / Lover Soul Music & Associates; Highest oricon position (weekly): #1; Weeks on chart: 14; Sales: 54.049; Highest Billboard Japan Hot 100 position: #7 (Kanojo wa Zombie), #78 (Supernova Express 2016) | 01. Kanojo wa Zombie; 02. Scoop; 03. Supernova Express 2016; 04. Sora ga Aozora de Aru Tame ni |
| 54th | [Deathtopia]: Released: 08-03-2016; Label: Pony Canyon / Lover Soul Music & Associates; Highest oricon position (weekly): #6; Weeks on chart: 9; Sales: 41,536; Highest Billboard Japan Hot 100 position: #8 | 01. Deathtopia; 02. Chou Onsoku Destiny; 03. Justice [from] Guilty (Live); 04. Binetsu Agirl Summer (Live); 05. Kuroku Nure! (Live); 06. everKrack (Live); 07. Coyote, Colored Darkness (Live); 08. World's End (Live) |
| 55th | WINTERDELICS. EP: Anata to Ikite Yuku (WINTERDELICS.EP ～あなたといきてゆく～): Released: 11-22-2017; Label: Pony Canyon / Lover Soul Music & Associates; Highest oricon position (weekly): #3; Weeks on chart: 9; Sales: 41,972; Highest Billboard Japan Hot 100 position: #5 (Anata to Ikite Yuku) | 01. Anata to Ikite Yuku; 02. Tokei (Re-Recording); 03. Satellite of Love (Re-Recording); 04. Joker (Live from Visual Japan Summit 2016); 05. [SUMMERDELICS] Reprise |

Approximately total single sales (including video single "Survival", DVD single "Itsuka" and collaboration singles "Scream" and "Answer"): 20.451.156

=== Videos ===
| Video # | Video information | Video track list |
|---|---|---|
| 1st | Video Glay: Released: 05-17-1995; Label: Platinum Records | 01. Speed Pop (Introduction); 02. Rain; 03. Manatsu no Tobira; 04. Kanojo no "Modern..."; 05. Freeze My Love; 06. Innocence |
| 2nd | Video Glay 2: Released: 05-02-1996; Label: Platinum Records | 01. More Than Love; 02. Yes, Summerdays; 03. Glorious; 04. Ikiteku Tsuyosa; 05. Zutto Futari de... |
| 3rd | 無限のdéjà vu (Mugen no déjà vu); Document of "Beat out!" Tours: Released: 01-29-1997; Label: Platinum Records; Sales: 136,740 | 01. More Than Love; 02. Ikiteku Tsuyosa; 03. Tsuki ni Inoru; 04. Innocence; 05. Shuumatsu no Baby Talk; 06. Shutter Speeds no Theme; 07. Love Slave; 08. Together; 09. Yes, Summerdays; 10. Kanojo no "Modern..."; 11. Acid Head; 12. Beloved; 13. Glorious; 14. Burst; 15. Kiseki no Hate; 16. Zutto Futari de... |
| 4th | Hit the World Glay Arena Tour '97 at Yoyogidaiichitaiikukan: Released: 12-03-1997; Label: Platinum Records; Sales: 286,102 | 01. Kuchibiru; 02. More Than Love; 03. Ikiteku Tsuyosa; 04. Freeze My Love; 05. A Boy: Zutto Wasurenai; 06. Kiseki no Hate; 07. Cynical; 08. Shuumatsu no Baby Talk; 09. Beloved; 10. Hit the World Chart!; 11. Shutter Speeds No Theme; 12. Acid Head; 13. Glorious; 14. I'm Yours; 15. Kissin' Noise; 16. Kanojo no "Modern..." |
| 5th | Video Glay 3: Released: 02-05-1998; Label: Platinum Records; Sales: 269,597 | 01. Yes, Summerdays; 02. Together; 03. Beloved; 04. A Boy: Zutto Wasure; 05. Kuchibiru; 06. Rhapsody; 07. However; 08. Haru wo Ai Suru Hito |
| 6th | "Pure Soul" Tour '98: Released: 08-05-1998; Label: Unlimited Records / Mustard; Sales: 265,251 | 01. Yuuwaku; 02. Lovers Change Fighters, Cool; 03. Ikiteku Tsuyosa; 04. Little Lovebirds; 05. May Fair; 06. Soul Love; 07. Ai; 08. I'm Yours; 09. Kuchibiru; 10. Kanojo no "Modern..."; 11. Acid Head; 12. Beloved; 13. More Than Love; 14. Shutter Speeds no Theme; 15. I'm in Love |
| 7th | Summer of '98 Pure Soul in Stadium: Released: 12-09-1998; Label: Unlimited Records / Mustard; Sales: 253,576 | 01. You May Dream; 02. Biribiri Crashmen; 03. Soul Love; 04. May Fair; 05. Fried Chicken & Beer; 06. 3 Nen Go; 07. However; 08. Kuchibiru; 09. More Than Love; 10. Pure Soul; 11. Yuuwaku; 12. Acid Head; 13. I'm in Love |
| 8th | Dome Tour "Pure Soul" 1999 Live in Big Egg: Released: 07-07-1999; Label: Unlimited Records / Mustard; Sales: 217,217 | 01. 3 Nen Go; 02. You May Dream; 03. Young Oh! Oh!; 04. Biribiri Crashmen; 05. Be with You; 06. Pure Soul; 07. Doku Rock; 08. Strawberry Shake; 09. Love Slave; 10. Winter, Again; 11. Come On!!; 12. Shutter Speeds No Theme; 13. Cynical; 14. I'm in Love; 15. Survival; 16. Burst |
| 9th | Video Glay 4: Released: 04-05-2000; Label: Unlimited Records / Mustard; Sales: | 01. Yuuwaku; 02. Soul Love; 03. Be with You; 04. Winter, Again (directed by Yutaka Onaga); 05. Kokodewanai, Dokoka e 06. Happiness: Winter Mix; 07. Heavy Gauge; 08. Winter, again (directed by Hiroyuki Nakano) |
| 10th | Glay Expo '99 Survival Live in Makuhari: Released: 07-31-2000; Label: Unlimited Records / Mustard | 01. Opening; 02. Happy Swing; 03. Kuchibiru; 04. Glorious; 05. Shutter Speeds No Theme; 06. More Than Love; 07. Survival; 08. Ikiteku Tsuyosa; 09. Yes, Summerdays; 10. Summer FM; 11. Innocence; 12. Freeze My Love; 13. However; 14. Kokodewanai, Dokoka e 15. Two Bell Silence; 16. Misery; 17. Yuuwaku; 18. Come On!!; 19. Acid Head; 20. I'm in Love; 21. Kanojo no "Modern..."; 22. Biribiri Crashmen; 23. Burst / Rain / Burst; 24. Ending |
| 11th | Glay Expo 2001 Global Communication; Live in Hokkaido: Released: 01-01-2002; Label: Unlimited Records / Mustard | 01. Opening; 02. Ikiteku Tsuyosa; 03. Super Ball 425; 04. Soul Love; 05. Shutter Speeds No Theme; 06. Survival; 07. Global Communication; 08. Kuchibiru; 09. Biribiri Crashmen; 10. Hitohira no Jiyuu; 11. Summer FM; 12. Happy Swing; 13. Manatsu no Tobira; 14. Viva Viva Viva; 15. Back-Up; 16. Tomadoi; 17. Pure Soul; 18. Stay Tuned; 19. Mermaid; 20. Yuuwaku; 21. Acid Head; 22. Takuro Blues; 23. Wet Dream; 24. Misery; 25. Burst; 26. However; 27. Glorious; 28. I'm in Love; 29. Ending |
| 12th | Glay Expo 2001 Global Communication; Live in Hokkaido Special Edition: Released: 01-01-2002; Label: Unlimited Records / Mustard | Disc 1; 01. Opening; 02. Ikiteku Tsuyosa; 03. Super Ball 425; 04. Soul Love; 05. Shutter Speeds No Theme; 06. Survival; 07. Global Communication; 08. Kuchibiru; 09. Biribiri Crashmen; 10. Hitohira no Jiyuu; 11. Summer FM; 12. Happy Swing; 13. Manatsu no Tobira; 14. Viva Viva Viva; 15. Back-Up; 16. Tomadoi; 17. Pure Soul; 18. Stay Tuned; 19. Mermaid; 20. Yuuwaku; 21. Acid Head; 22. Takuro Blues; 23. Wet Dream; 24. Misery; 25. Burst; 26. However; 27. Glorious; 28. I'm in Love; 29. Ending; Disc 2; 01. Takuro Interview; 02. Global Communication Recording Document; 03. Takuro Interview; 04. "Global Communication" Demo Ver.: 05. Glay Expo 2001 Staff Meeting; 06. Takuro Interview; 07. Jiro Interview; 08. Glay Expo 2001 Opening CG Staff Meeting; 09. Hisashi Interview; 10. "Stay Tuned" Sapporo Ver.; 11. Teru Interview; 12. Glay Expo 2001 Rehearsal Document; 13. Teru Interview; 14. Shibuya-Ax Live Document; 15. Teru Interview; 16. Tokyo Stadium: "Telvis no Theme"; 17. Teru Interview; 18. Tokyo Stadium "Glorious"; 19. Tokyo Stadium "Rock Icon"; 20. Teru Interview; 21. Tokyo Stadium "Special Thanks"; 22. Hisashi Interview; 23. Hokkaido Rehearsal Document; 24. Expo Kan Member Annai; 25. Takuro Interview; 26. Jiro Interview; 27. Teru Interview; 28. Hisashi Interview; 29. Kyushu "Gloval Communication"; 30. Takuro Interview; 31. Kyushu "Cynical"; 32. Jiro Interview; 33. Kyushu MC; 34. Hisashi Interview; 35. Kyushu "FatSounds"; 36. Teru Interview; 37. Kyushu "Super Ball 425; 38. Takuro Interview; 39. Kyushu "I'm in Love"; 40. End Roll |
| 13th | Glay Dome Tour 2001-2002 One Love: Released: 08-27-2002; Label: Unlimited Records / Mustard | 01. Opening; 02. All Standard Is You; 03. Shitto; 04. Wet Dream; 05. Prize; 06. Kimi ga Mitsumeta Umi; 07. Fighting Spirit; 08. Hitohira no Jiyuu; 09. Highway No. 5; 10. Mister Popcorn; 11. Denki Iruka Kimyou na Shikou; 12. Viva Viva Viva; 13. Way of Difference; 14. Muyuu Byou; 15. Christmas Ring; 16. Stay Tuned; 17. Mermaid; 18. Think About My Daughter; 19. Global Communication; 20. Sotsugyou Made, Ato Sukoshi; 21. Acid Head; 22. Ending |
| 14th | Video Glay 5: Released: 11-20-2002; Label: Unlimited Records / Mustard; Sales: 38,260; Highest oricon position (weekly): ?; Weeks on chart: ? | 01. Mermaid; 02. Tomadoi; 03. Special Thanks; 04. Missing You; 05. Global Communication; 06. Stay Tuned; 07. Hitohira no Jiyuu; 08. Fighting Spirit; 09. Shitto; 10. Way of Difference; 11. Mata Koko de Aimashou; 12. Aitai Kimochi |
| 15th | Glay One Love in Beijing Live & Document: Released: 12-18-2002; Label: Unlimited Records / Mustard; Sales: 33,708; Highest oricon position (weekly):?; Weeks on chart: ? | 01. Global Communication; 02. Mata Kokode Aimashou; 03. Ge Sheng You Wei Xiao; 04. Beloved; 05. Koukai; 06. Viva Viva Viva; 07. FriedChicken & Beer; 08. Winter, Again; 09. I'm in Love |
| 16th | Glay High Communications Tour 2003: Released: 09-26-2003; Label: Unlimited Records / Mustard; Sales: 63,889; Highest oricon position (weekly): #1; Weeks on chart: 8 | 01. Opening; 02. High Communications; 03. Brothel Creepers; 04. All I Want; 05. Yuuwaku; 06. Haru wo Ai Suru Hito; 07. Girlish Moon; 08. Way of Difference; 09. Yuriginai Monotachi; 10. However; 11. Giant Strong Faust Super Star; 12. Fatsounds; 13. Come On!! 2003; 14. Itsuka; 15. Runaway Runaway; 16. Think About My Daughter; 17. Global Communication; 18. Children in the War; 19. Pure Soul; 20. Koukai; 21. 17ans 22. Kanojo no "Modern..."; 23. Mata Kokode Aimashou (Tour Mix Edit); 24. Ending |
| 17th | The Complete of The Frustrated: Released: 06-16-2004; Label: Unlimited Records / Mustard; Sales: ? | 01. Opening; 02. Billionaire Champagne Miles Away :Studio Live; 03. High Communications :Live; 04. Runaway Runaway (Short Ver.) :PV; 05. All I Want (Short Ver.) :Live; 06. Beautiful Dreamer (Short Ver.) :PV; 07. Coyote, Colored Darkness :Live; 08. Toki no Shizuku (Short Ver.) :PV; 09. Mugen no déjà vu Kara (Short Ver.) :Live; 10. Blast (Short Ver.) :Live; 11. Bugs in My Head :Live; 12. Minamigochi (Short Ver.) :Live; 13. Ano Natsu Kara Ichiban Tooi Basho :Live; 14. The Frustrated :Studio Live; 15. Street Life (Acoustic Ver.) :Studio |
| 18th | Acoustic Live in Nippon Budokan (produced by Jiro): Released: 11-03-2004; Label: Unlimited Records / Mustard; Sales: ? | 01. May Fair; 02. Savile Row 3 Banchi; 03. Doku Rock; 04. Come On!!; 05. Deatte Shimatta 2 Ri; 06. However; 07. Kanariya; 08. Happiness; 09. Russian . Hiro no Ue de 10. Biribiri Crashmen; 11. FriedChicken & Beer; 12. Miyako Wasure; 13. A Boy: Zutto Wasurenai; 14. Will Be King; 15. Shutter Speeds No Theme |
| 19th | Arena Tour 2000 "Heavy Gauge" in Saitama Super Arena: Released: 11-03-2004; Label: Unlimited Records / Mustard; Sales: ? | 01. Heavy Gauge; 02. Fatsouds; 03. Mermaid; 04. Biribiri Crashmen; 05. Ikigai; 06. Special Thanks; 07. Savile Row 3 Banchi; 08. Tomadoi; 09. Missing You; 10. Level Devil; 11. Rock Icon; 12. Yuuwaku; 13. Kanojo no "Modern..."; 14. Come On!!; 15. Survival; 16. Will Be King; 17. Wet Dream; 18. Ikiteku Tsuyosa; 19. Shutter Speeds No Theme; 20. Acid Head |
| 20th | Glay Expo 2001 Global Communication; Live in Tokyo Stadium: Released: 11-03-2004; Label: Unlimited Records / Mustard; Sales: ? | 01. Stay Tuned; 02. Glorious; 03. More Than Love; 04. Super Ball 425; 05. Mermaid; 06. Hitohira no Jiyuu; 07. Pure Soul; 08. Back-Up; 09. Viva Viva Viva; 10. Rock Icon; 11. May Fair; 12. Special Thanks; 13. Biribiri Crashmen; 14. Come On!!; 15. Global Communication; 16. Survival; 17. Shutter Speeds No Theme; 18. Yuuwaku; 19. Good Bye Bye Sunday; 20. However; 21. Wet Dream; 22. Ikiteku Tsuyosa; 23. Acid Head; 24. I'm in Love; 25. However |
| 21st | Glay Box Vol. 1 (Including Live DVD 3 Title and Glay Perfect Data 1994-2004): Released: 11-03-2004; Label: Unlimited Records / Mustard; Sales: 36,344; Highest oricon position (weekly): #1 | |
| 22nd | Loves & Thanks: Hadousuru Shinon; Glay Expo 2004 in Universal; Studios Japan The Frustrated: Released: 12-15-2004; Label: Unlimited Records / Mustard; Sales: 58,958; Highest oricon position (weekly): #2 | Disc 1; 01. Koukai; 02. Ano Natsu Kara Ichiban Tooi Basho; 03. Tomadoi; 04. However; 05. Cynical; 06. Beautiful Dreamer; 07. Minamigochi; 08. Yuuwaku; 09. Biribiri Crashmen; 10. Soul Love; 11. Glorious; 12. Haru wo Ai Suru Hito; 13. Ikiteku Tsuyosa; 14. Peak Hateshinaku Soul Kagirinaku; 15. Shuumatsu no Baby Talk; Disc 2; 01. Beloved; 02. However; 03. I'm in Love; 04. Pure Soul; 05. Blue Jean; 06. Misery; 07. Kanojo no "Modern..."; 08. Shutter Speeds No Theme; 09. Expo 2004 Medley; 10. Beautiful Dreamer; 11. Acid Head; 12. Minamigochi |
| 23rd | Glay Dome Tour 2005 "White Road" in Tokyo Dome: Released: 06-22-2005; Sales: 72,975; Highest oricon position (weekly): #1; Label: Unlimited Records / Mustard | Disc 1; 01. Prologue: White Road; 02. White Road; 03. Freeze My Love; 04. Ikiteku Tsuyosa; 05. Stay Tuned; 06. Kokodewanai, Dokoka e 07. Winter, Again; 08. Way of Difference; 09. Zutto Futari de...: 10. Beloved; 11. Global Communication; 12. Survival; 13. Glorious; 14. Rain; 15. Soul Love; 16. Kanojo no "Modern..."; 17. Yuuwaku; 18. Beautiful Dreamer; 19. Toki no Shizuku; 20. Tsuzureori: So Far and Yet So Close; 21. Epilogue: White Road; Disc 2; 01. Doku Rock Session; 02. However; 03. Aitai Kimochi; 04. Cynical; 05. Peak Hateshinaku Soul Kagirinaku; 06. Shutter Speeds No Theme; 07. Acid Head; 08. Minamigochi; 09. Ending: The Frustrated |
| 24th | Rebirth: Rock'N'Roll Swindle at Nippon Budokan: Released: 10-04-2006; Label: Toshiba EMI / Capitol Records; Sales: 46,676 | 01. Rock'N'Roll Swindle; 02. Yuuwaku; 03. Ikiteku Tsuyosa; 04. Glorious; 05. Fatsounds; 06. Coyote, Colored Darkness; 07. Heavy Gauge; 08. 3 Nen Go; 09. Kiseki no Hate; 10. Beloved; 11. Tsuzureori: So Far and Yet So Close; 12. Kissin' Noise; 13. Kanojo no "Modern..."; 14. Shutter Speeds No Theme; 15. Peak Hateshinaku Soul Kagirinaku; 16. Beautiful Dreamer; 17. Layla; 18. Winter, Again; 19. More than Love; 20. Acid Head; 21. I'm in Love |
| 25th | Glay Arena Tour 2007 "Love Is Beautiful": Complete Edition: Released: 11-07-2007; Label: Toshiba EMI / Capitol Records; Sales: 45,329 | 01. Mirror; 02. Rock'N'Roll Swindle; 03. Henna Yume: Thousand Dreams; 04. Biribiri Crashmen; 05. Ikiteku Tsuyosa; 06. 100 Man Kai no KISS; 07. Natsuoto; 08. Saragi no tou 09. Shitto; 10. American Innovation; 11. Lock on You; 12. Bokutachi no shouhai 13. I Will; 14. Lone Wolf; 15. World's End; 16. More Than Love; 17. Shutter Speeds No Theme; 18. Peak Hateshinaku Soul Kagirinaku; 19. Beautiful Dreamer; 20. Layla; 21. Happy Swing; 22. Kodou; 23. Think About My Daughter; 24. Kanojo no "Modern..."; 25. Acid Head |
| 26th | Video Glay 6: Released: 12-19-2007; Label: Toshiba EMI / Capitol Records; Sales: 37,392; Highest oricon position (weekly): #1; Weeks on chart: 7 | 01. Itsuka; 02. Beautiful Dreamer; 03. Street Life; 04. Toki no shizuku 05. Runaway Runaway; 06. The Frustrated; 07. Billionaire Champagne Miles Away; 08. Tenshi no wakemae 09. Peak hateshinaku soul kagirinaku 10. Blue Jean; 11. White Road; 12. Rock'N'Roll Swindle; 13. Koi; 14. Natsuoto; 15. 100 man kai no Kiss; 16. Kodou |
| 27th | Glay 15th Anniversary Special Live 2009 The Great Vacation in Nissan Stadium: Released: 01-27-2010; Label: Toshiba EMI / Capitol Records; Sales: 50,861; Highest oricon position (weekly): #2; Weeks on chart: 4 | 1. [DISC1&2 (Live on August 15)] Great Vacation; 2. [DISC1&2 (Live on August 15)] Layla; 3. [DISC1&2 (Live on August 15)] Global Communication; 4. [DISC1&2 (Live on August 15)] Mermaid; 5. [DISC1&2 (Live on August 15)] Laotour: Furueru Kobushi ga Tsukamu Mono; 6. [DISC1&2 (Live on August 15)] Rock'N'Roll Swindle; 7. [DISC1&2 (Live on August 15)] Street Life; 8. [DISC1&2 (Live on August 15)] Run; 9. [DISC1&2 (Live on August 15)] Julia; 10. [DISC1&2 (Live on August 15)] Starless Night; 11. [DISC1&2 (Live on August 15)] The Birthday Girl; 12. [DISC1&2 (Live on August 15)] Tsuzure Ori: So Far and Yet So Close; 13. [DISC1&2 (Live on August 15)] Synchronicity; 14. [DISC1&2 (Live on August 15)] I Sm xxx 15. [DISC1&2 (Live on August 15)] High Communications; 16. [DISC1&2 (Live on August 15)] Verb; 17. [DISC1&2 (Live on August 15)] Peak Hateshinaku, Soul Kagirinaku; 18. [DISC1&2 (Live on August 15)] Beautiful Dreamer; 19. [DISC1&2 (Live on August 15)] Say Your Dream; 20. [DISC1&2 (Live on August 15)/encore] Shutter Speeds No Theme; 21. [DISC1&2 (Live on August 15)/encore] Acid Head; 22. [DISC3&4 (Live on August 16)] Great Vacation; 23. [DISC3&4 (Live on August 16)] Biribiri Crash Men; 24. [DISC3&4 (Live on August 16)] Glorious; 25. [DISC3&4 (Live on August 16)] Soul Love; 26. [DISC3&4 (Live on August 16)] Summer FM; 27. [DISC3&4 (Live on August 16)] Survival; 28. [DISC3&4 (Live on August 16)] Cynical; 29. [DISC3&4 (Live on August 16)] Sen no Knife ga Mune wo Sasu; 30. [DISC3&4 (Live on August 16)] Zutto Futari de. . .; 31. [DISC3&4 (Live on August 16)] However; 32. [DISC3&4 (Live on August 16)] Julia; 33. [DISC3&4 (Live on August 16)] More than Love; 34. [DISC3&4 (Live on August 16)] Ikiteku Tsuyosa; 35. [DISC3&4 (Live on August 16)] Yuuwaku; 36. [DISC3&4 (Live on August 16)] Happy Swing; 37. [DISC3&4 (Live on August 16)] Kanojo no "Modern. . ."; 38. [DISC3&4 (Live on August 16)] Shutter Speeds No Theme; 39. [DISC3&4 (Live on August 16)] Acid Head; 40. [DISC3&4 (Live on August 16)] I'm in Love; 41. [DISC3&4 (Live on August 16)/encore] Peak Hateshinaku, Soul Kagirinaku; 42. [DISC3&4 (Live on August 16)/encore] Beautiful Dreamer |

DVD sales information is incomplete and may not be up-to-date.

== Tie up songs ==
- Rain (1994): ending theme of anime "Yamato Takeru".
- Manatsu no Tobira (真夏の扉) (1994): opening theme of anime "Yamato Takeru".
- Freeze My Love： opening theme of TV Asahi's sport show "Ring no Tamashii".
- Zutto Futtari de...(ずっと2人で...)： ending theme of TV Asahi's "Channel ninety nine".
- Gone with the Wind: opening theme of NHK-BS2's animation "Biker Mice from Mars".
- Yes, Summerdays：Miki's "Camelia Diamond" commercial movie.
- Ikitekutsuyosa (生きてく強さ)：opening theme of TV Asahi's variety show "Kazeona Downtown".
- Glorious (グロリアス)："Victoria" commercial movie.
- Together：mizuno commercial movie.
- Beloved：theme song for TBS's drama "ひと夏のプロポーズ"/"Hokkaido Shumbun Press" commercial movie.
- a Boy - zutto wasurenai (〜ずっと忘れない〜)：ending theme of NHK's show Pop Jam.
- Groovy Tour：Mitsubishi Motors "Pajero Jr." commercial movie Song.
- Kuchibiru (口唇)：ending theme of Fuji Television's show "Hey!Hey!Hey! Music Champ".
- However： theme of TBS drama "Ryakudatsu Ai - Abunai Onna (略奪愛・アブない女)".
- Yūwaku (誘惑)：TDK's Mini Disc campaign song.
- Soul Love： Kanebo Ltd. "Bronze Love Summer '98" campaign song.
- You May Dream：Meiji Seika chocolate cookie "Horn" commercial movie song.
- pure soul：TDK's mini disc campaign song.
- Be With You: theme song of Fuji Television's drama "Tabloid".
- Winter, again：East Japan Railway Company's "Jr Ski Ski" commercial movie song.
- Survival (サバイバル): opening theme of TV Tokyo's anime Kaikan Phrase.
- kokodewanai, dokokae (ここではない、どこかへ)：theme song of Fuji Television's drama "Perfect Love".
- Ikigai (生きがい)：TDK's digital media commercial movie song.
- Will Be King：Meiji Seika's "Fran" commercial song.
- Fatsounds：Meiji Seika's "Horn" commercial song.
- Happiness：theme song of TBS Television drama "Sanyoubino koibitotachie (金曜日の恋人たちへ)".
- Tomadoi (とまどい)：theme song of TBS's show "Mirai Nikki VII".
- Special Thanks：theme song of the movie"Mirai Nikki (未来日記)".
- Global Communication：KDDI's "M-up Glay Phone" commercial movie song.
- Stay Tuned：Nifty's "Broadband@nifty" CM song.
- Shitto (嫉妬): "Glay Life Mastercard" CM song.
- Fighting Spirit："Santory Diet" CM song.
- Kimiga Mitsumeta Umi (君が見つめた海)："20 years of blood donation campaign" CM song.
- Way of Difference：theme song of Fuji Television's "Ainori".
- Mata kokode aimashou (またここであいましょう)：Japan Airlines "Jal New China" CM song.
- Aitai Komochi (逢いたい気持ち)：theme song of TV Asahi's drama "Satorare".
- Kōkai (航海)："Glay Life Mastercard Beijing Memorial Type" CM song.
- Shiawase ni naru, sono toki ni (幸せになる、その時に): theme song of TBS drama "Seiji Echiro".
- Itsuka (いつか)：theme song of TBS Television drama『 "Seiji Echiro (刑事☆イチロー).
- Beautiful Dreamer and Tenshi no Wakemae (天使のわけまえ)：Suzuki/Chevrolet Cruise CM song
- Street Life：NTT DoCoMo CM song
- Toki no Shizuku (時の雫): theme song of TV Asahi's drama "Sky High 2"
- Billionaire Champagne Miles Away：WOWOW channel's Europe Soccer image song.
- Runaway Runaway： Life Card CM song.
- Minamigochi (南東風)：WOWOW channel 2004 Summer Campaign song
- Peak Hateshinaku Soul Kagirinaku (ピーク果てしなく ソウル限りなく)：WOWOW CM song.
- Blue Jean：TBC 2004 Summer Campaign CM song.
- (Unknown title)：House Hokkaido Stew Cream CM song.
- Tsuzure ori - so far and yet so close -(つづれ織り 〜)：Japan Fm Network Niigata disaster campaign theme song.
- Scream (Glay X Exile)：TBS Television 50th anniversary "Doors" special theme song.
- Dareka no Tameni Ikiru (誰かの為に生きる)：TBS Television' J Sports "Super Soccer Plus" theme song.
- Natsuoto (夏音)：TBS Television's show "Aisuru Hani Kami! (恋するハニカミ!)" theme song.
- Henna Yume - Thousand Dreams- (変な夢〜): "Modern Amusement" clothing CM song.
- Kodō (鼓動)：main theme song of the movie "Taitei no Ken (大帝の剣)"
- Ashes - 1969-：Asahi Television "Adorena!Garejii" ending theme.
- Starless Night: NTV's Soccer programs image song / "Eclipse" Fujitsu CM song.
- Verb：NTV's "Music Fighter" opening theme /"music.jp" TV CM song.
- Aka to Kuro no Matadora (紅と黒のMatadora)：Japanese theme of Korean movie "Shukumei".
- I Love you o Sagashiteru (I Love Youをさがしてる)：Asahi Television's drama "Dageki Tenshi Ruri (打撃天使ルリ)" opening theme.
- Haru made wa (春までは)："Toyota Prius" CM song.
- I Am XXX: theme song for the movie Blood: The Last Vampire
- Let Me Be: theme song for the movie documentary "Isamu Katayama - Artisanal Life"
- Synchronicity: theme song for Xbox 360 game Magna Carta 2.
- Satellite of love: theme song for the short animated film "Je t'aime".

== Notes ==
1. Glay official homepage. Happy Swing Space Site.
2. Oricon official homepage. Oricon Style.
3. DVD sales information: http://jbbs.livedoor.jp/bbs/read.cgi/music/3914/1057507128/
