= Drive: Glay Complete Best =

Compilation album by Glay
- Released: November 29, 2000
- Genre: Power pop, pop rock, progressive rock
- Length: 132:33
- Label: Pony Canyon; Mustard/Unlimited Records
- Producer: Masahide Sakuma; Glay

Glay chronology
Heavy Gauge (1999)	Drive: Glay Complete Best (2000)	One Love (2002)

Drive: Glay Complete Best (typeset as DRIVE ~GLAY complete BEST~) is the second "greatest hits" album by Japanese pop/rock band Glay. It is composed by some of Glay's most popular singles and album tracks from their debut in 1994 to 2000. The two discs each contain hits from albums Speed Pop to Heavy Gauge as well as various singles. The album peaked at #1 at Oricon charts and sold 2,637,420 according to the charts. The album was certified "Double Million" by the Recording Industry Association of Japan (RIAJ).

== Track listing ==
=== Disc 1 ===
1. "Tomadoi (Jet the phantom)" (とまどい (Jet the Phantom))
2. "Kuchibiru" (口唇, Lips)
3. "Shutter Speeds no tēma" (The theme song of Shutter Speeds)
4. "Zutto futari de..." (ずっと２人で…, Always together)
5. "Glorious" (グロリアス)
6. "A boy (zutto wasurenai)" (A Boy: ずっと忘れない, A boy: unforgettable)
7. "Ikiteku tsuyosa" (生きてく強さ, Live Strong)
8. "Happy Swing"
9. "Kanojo no 'Modern...'" (彼女の"Modern...")
10. "Soul Love"
11. "However"
12. "I'm in Love"

=== Disc 2 ===
1. "Yuuwaku" (誘惑, Temptation)
2. "Ikigai" (生きがい)
3. "Biribiri Crashmen" (ビリビリクラッシュメン)
4. "Beloved"
5. "Happiness"
6. "Survival"
7. "Pure Soul"
8. "Be with You"
9. "Winter, Again"
10. "Haru wo ai suru hito" (春を愛する人, The One who Love Spring)
11. "Special Thanks"
12. "Missing You"
