= Global communication (disambiguation) =

Global communication or international communication is a branch of communication studies.

Global communication may also refer to:

- Global Communication, an electronic music act, composed of Tom Middleton and Mark Pritchard
- Global Communication Group, Inc., or Sky Link TV
- "Global Communication", song on One Love (Glay album) (2001)
  - Glay Global Communication, TV series (2001)

== See also ==
- Study of global communication
- Global Communications Conference
- Global Communications Academy
