= Super Best =

Super Best may refer to:

- Super Best (The Blue Hearts album)
- Super Best (Shizuka Kudo album)
- Super Best, album by Lindberg (band)
- Super Best, album by Chage & Aska
- Super Best Records: 15th Celebration, compilation album by Japanese R&B singer Misia
- The Great Vacation Vol. 2: Super Best of Glay compilation album by Japanese band Glay 2009
- The Great Vacation Vol. 1: Super Best of Glay compilation album by Japanese band Glay 2009
