= Stay Tuned =

Stay Tuned may refer to:

== Film and television ==
- Stay Tuned (film), a 1992 American film directed by Peter Hyams
- Stay Tuned (TV series), a Canadian comedy television series
- "Stay Tuned", an episode of The Avengers 1960s TV series
- Stay Tuned!, a 2019 Japanese manga by Noriko Sasaki
- Stay Tuned, a news program hosted by Gadi Schwartz

== Music ==
- Stay Tuned (Sharon, Lois & Bram album), 1987
- Stay Tuned (Chet Atkins album), 1985
- Stay Tuned, a 2000 album by Let's Go Bowling
- Stay Tuned, a 2007 album by Mark Radice
- "Stay Tuned", a song by Glay
- "Stay Tuned", a track on 1992 album Daily Operation by Gang Starr
- "Stay Tuned", a track on 2005 The Find (Ohmega Watts album)
- "Stay Tuned", a track on 2007 album Comicopera by Robert Wyatt
- "Stay Tuned", a track on 2009 album Evolution of a Man by Brian McKnight
- "Stay Tuned", a track on 2001 album Smiling & Waving by Anja Garbarek
- "Stay Tuned", a track on 2013 album Last Patrol by Monster Magnet
- "Stay Tuned", 2009 single by Exile (producer)

== See also ==
- Nancy Drew: Stay Tuned for Danger, PC game
- Extraña invasión, or Stay Tuned for Terror, a 1965 film
- ...Or Stay Tuned, 2003 album by the People Under the Stairs
