= Glay Rare Collectives Vol. 1 and 2 =

Glay Rare Collectives Vol. 1

Greatest hits album by Glay
- Released: February 2, 2003
- Recorded: ???
- Genre: Power pop, pop rock
- Length: 108:59
- Label: Toshiba EMI; Mustard/Unlimited Records
- Producer: Masahide Sakuma; Glay

Glay chronology
| Unity Roots and Family, Away (2002) | Glay Rare Collectives Vol. 1 (2003) | The Frustrated (2004) |

Glay Rare Collectives Vol. 2

Greatest hits album by Glay
- Released: February 2, 2003
- Recorded: ???
- Genre: Power pop, pop rock
- Length: 75:32
- Label: Toshiba EMI; Mustard/Unlimited Records
- Producer: Masahide Sakuma; Glay

Glay chronology
| Unity Roots and Family, Away (2002) | Glay Rare Collectives Vol. 2 (2003) | The Frustrated (2004) |

Singles from Glay Rare Collectives Vol. 2
- 1. "Itsuka" Released: March 5, 2003

Glay Rare Collectives Vol. 1 and 2 are the third and fourth released collection albums from the Japanese rock band, Glay. Unlike Review and Drive: Glay Complete Best, these two double disc CDs feature all of the B sides from their singles that were released from their debut to "mata koko de aimashou" as well as some other songs originally used for different works and not featured in any of their albums or singles. The first volume features the original song "Shiawase ni naru, sono toki ni", while the second volume featured the then newly released song "Itsuka".

== Track listing ==
=== Volume 1 ===
Disc 1

1. Life ~tooi sora no shita de~ (Life ～遠い空の下で～)
2. Innocence
3. Regret
4. Gone with the Wind
5. Acid Head
6. Believe in fate
7. Together (new version with orchestra)
8. Haru wo ai suru hito (春を愛する人)
9. I'm Yours
10. Little Lovebirds
11. Doku Rokku (Rock) (毒ロック)
12. Sutoroberii Sheiku (Strawberry Shake) (ストロベリーシェイク)
13. It's Dying It's Not Dying
14. Shiwase ni naru, sono toki ni (幸せになる、その時に)

Disc 2

1. Innocence (Live Version 1995.6.12 in Shibuya Kokaido)
2. Mitsumeteitai (見つめていたい, from Glay Tour '98 pure soul Pamphlet CD)
3. Sabaibaru (Survival) (サバイバル, Live Version 99.3.10 In Tokyo Dome)
4. Misery (from Hide Tribute Spirits)
5. Misery (Glay Expo'99 Survival Live Version)
6. Koko dewanai, dokoka e (ここではない、どこかへ, Glay Expo'99 Survival Live Version)
7. Hitohira no jiyuu (ひとひらの自由, Glay Expo 2001 "Global Communication In Kyushu Version)

=== Volume 2 ===
Disc 1

1. Young Oh! Oh!
2. Hello My Life
3. Summer FM
4. Rock Icon
5. Good Bye Bye Sunday
6. Time
7. Why Don't We Make You Happy
8. Good Morning N.Y.C
9. Back Up
10. Super Ball 425
11. Sotsugyou made, ato sukoshi (卒業まで、あと少し)
12. Brothel Creepers
13. Itsuka (いつか)

Disc 2

1. 17bars (Instrumental)
2. Cynical
3. Neuromancer
4. Ai (アイ)
5. Surf Rider
6. Giant Strong Faust Super Star
7. 17ans
8. I'm Yours (Knightmare mix'99)
9. Dosanko shiisaa (道産子シーサー)

== Chart information ==
- Volume One

Oricon Top Ranking: #3
Weeks on: 11
Overall Glay Ranking: #12

- Volume Two

Oricon Top Ranking: #2
Weeks on: 11
Overall Glay Ranking: #11
(NOTE: Overall Glay Ranking is how it is ranked against Glay's other albums according to the Oricon)
