= Love Is Beautiful =

Love Is Beautiful may refer to:

- Love Is Beautiful (album), a 2007 album by Glay
- Love Is Beautiful (TV series), a 2002 Hong Kong costume drama
