= The Great Vacation Vol. 1: Super Best of Glay =

Compilation album by Glay
- Released: June 10, 2009
- Genre: Power pop, pop rock
- Label: EMI Music Japan
- Producer: Glay, Masahide Sakuma

Glay chronology
Love Is Beautiful (2007)	The Great Vacation Vol. 1: Super Best of Glay (2009)	The Great Vacation Vol. 2: Super Best of Glay (2009)

The Great Vacation Vol.1: Super Best of Glay is a compilation album by Japanese band Glay, released on June 10, 2009. It reached #2 on Billboard Japan Top Albums and Oricon charts and sold 194.289 copies. It was certified Platinum for the shipment of over 250,000 copies.

== Track list ==
Disc 1

1. Yuuwaku
2. MERMAID
3. Missing You
4. GLOBAL COMMUNICATION
5. STAY TUNED
6. Hitohira no Jiyuu
7. Way of Difference
8. Mata Koko de Aimashou
9. Aitai Kimochi
10. Itsuka
11. BEAUTIFUL DREAMER
12. STREET LIFE
13. Toki no Shizuku
14. Tenshi no Wakemae
15. Peak Hateshinaku Soul Kagirinaku

Disc 2

1. Blue Jean (Jet the Phantom Mix)
2. White Road
3. SCREAM (GLAY x EXILE)
4. ROCK'N'ROLL SWINDLE
5. LAYLA
6. ANSWER (GLAY feat. KYOSUKE HIMURO)
7. Natsuoto
8. Henna Yume ~THOUSAND DREAMS~
9. 100 Mankai no KISS
10. MIRROR
11. Kodou
12. Bokutachi no Shouhai
13. SORRY LOVE
14. aka to kuro no MATADORA
15. Harumadewa

Disc 3

1. Burning Chrome
2. ASHES-1969-
3. VERB
4. laotour ～Furueru Kobushi ga Tsukamu Mono～
5. THE BIRTHDAY GIRL
6. I LOVE YOU wo sagashiteru
7. Itsuka no Natsu ni Mimi wo Sumaseba
8. NO ESCAPE
9. Synchronicity
10. I am xxx
11. RUN
12. SAY YOUR DREAM
13. Rhythm
