= Glay (album) =

Studio album by Glay
- Released: October 13, 2010
- Recorded: 2010
- Genre: Pop rock, power pop
- Label: Loversoul Music & Associates, distributed by For Life Music Entertainment
- Producer: Glay/Masahide Sakuma

Glay chronology
The Great Vacation Vol. 2: Super Best of Glay (2009)	Glay (2010)	Justice/Guilty (2013)

Glay is the eleventh studio album by Japanese band Glay. The album was released on October 13, 2010. It reached #1 on the Oricon charts and Billboard Japan Top Albums chart and sold a total of 125,081 copies as of January 3, 2011. It is the first album released under the band's own label "Loversoul Music & Associates." The limited edition came with a DVD featuring a live at Niigata Lots on July 30, 2010 and the anime movie Je t'aime, which was directed by Oshii Mamoru, produced by Production I.G and featured "Satellite of Love" as the theme song.

The album is certified Gold by the RIAJ for shipment of over 100,000 copies.

== Track listing ==
=== Standard Edition ===
1. Shikina (シキナ)
2. Kegarenaki Season (汚れなきSEASON)
3. Wasted Time
4. Haruka... (遥か…)
5. Apologize
6. Tsuki no Yoru ni (月の夜に)
7. Kaze ni Hitori (風にひとり)
8. Precious
9. Satellite of Love
10. Chelsea

=== Limited Edition ===
- Glay (album)
- Original video animation

Je t'aime
- Directed by: Mamoru Oshii
- Produced by: Mitsuhisa Ishikawa
- Music by: Glay
- Studio: Production I.G Division 8
- Released: October 20, 2010 – present
- Runtime: 10 minutes
- Episodes: 1

Bonus DVD track listing

1. 2010.7.30 Niigata Lots Otoko Night Shuuroku Yotei 2010.7.30 (新潟LOTS「男ナイト」収録予定)
2. Tanpei Eiga Je t'aime (短編映画「Je t'aime」)
