= Heavy Gauge =

Studio album by Glay
- Released: October 20, 1999
- Genre: Power pop; pop rock; progressive rock
- Length: 65:35
- Label: Pony Canyon; Mustard/Unlimited Records
- Producer: Masahide Sakuma; Glay

Glay chronology
Pure Soul (1998)	Heavy Gauge (1999)	Drive: Glay Complete Best (2000)

Singles from Heavy Gauge
- 1. "Be With You" Released: November 25, 1998; 2. "Winter, Again" Released: February 3, 1999; 3. "Survival" Released: May 19, 1999; 4. "koko dewanai, dokoka e" Released: August 8, 1999; 5. "Happiness" Released: January 1, 2000

Heavy Gauge is the 6th album by Japanese rock band Glay. This is the first album which Glay dabbles in the genres of progressive rock and gospel, using progressive chords on songs like the self-titled track, and using gospel choirs in songs such as "Will Be King" and "Happiness". This album also marks a milestone in Glay's career with their hit song "Winter, Again". The song won Single of the Year (1999) at the Japan Record Award. Many songs from the album were used in the Meiji Seika Kaisha advertising campaigns for their "Horn" and "Flan" product food lines. The album reached #1 on Oricon charts and sold about 2,370,000. The album was certified "Double Million" by the Recording Industry Association of Japan (RIAJ).

== Track listing ==
1. Heavy Gauge - 6:52
2. Fatsounds - 3:50
3. Survival - 4:24
4. Koko Dewanai, Dokoka e (ここではない、どこかへ) (Translation: To somewhere, that is not here) - 5:49
5. Happiness - 5:51
6. Summer FM - 5:11
7. Level Devil - 5:06
8. Be with You - 5:10
9. Winter, Again - 5:14
10. Will Be King - 7:30
11. Ikigai (生きがい) (Translation: Something to live for) - 5:57
12. Savile Row -3 Savile Row- (Savile Row ～サヴィル ロウ 3番地～) - 4:35

Bonus Tracks:

1. Young Oh! Oh!
2. Hello My Life
3. Doku Rock (毒ロック) (Translation: Poisonous Rock)

== Album chart information ==
Oricon Top Ranking: #1
