= Beat Out! =

Studio album by Glay
- Released: February 7, 1996
- Genre: Power pop, pop rock, alternative rock
- Length: 62:00
- Label: Platinum Records / PolyGram (1996); Warner Music Japan (2001); Toshiba EMI (2003)
- Producer: Glay

Glay chronology
Speed Pop (1995)	Beat Out! (1996)	Beloved (1996)

Singles from Beat Out!
- 1. "Yes, Summerdays" Released: August 9, 1995; 2. "Ikiteku Tsuyosa" Released: November 8, 1995; 3. "Glorious" Released: January 17, 1996

Beat Out! (typeset as BEAT out!) is the third album by Japanese rock/pop band Glay. It was released on February 7, 1996, and peaked at No. 1 at Oricon charts, with 821,890 copies sold. It was named one of the top albums from 1989 to 1998 in a 2004 issue of the music magazine Band Yarouze. Teru said that "Tsuki ni Inoru" was heavily influenced by Luna Sea.

== Track listing ==
1. "More Than Love" – 4:47
2. "Yes, Summerdays" – 5:10
3. "Genshoku no Sora (Cloudy Sky) (原色の空<Cloudy Sky>)" – 4:19
4. "Trouble On Monday" – 5:28
5. "Together" – 7:02
6. "Tsuki ni Inoru (月に祈る)" – 4:19
7. "Ikiteku Tsuyosa (生きてく強さ)" – 3:49
8. "Shuumatsu no Baby Talk (週末のBaby talk)" – 5:57
9. "Glorious (グロリアス)" – 4:55
10. "Kiseki no Hate (軌跡の果て)" – 5:34
11. "Miki Piano" – 5:14
