= Ballad Best Singles: White Road =

Compilation album by Glay
- Released: January 19, 2005
- Genres: Pop rock, power pop Length = 75:01
- Labels: EMI Music Japan; Unlimited Records
- Producer: Glay

Glay chronology
The Frustrated (2004)	Ballad Best Singles: White Road (2005)	Love Is Beautiful (2007)

Ballad Best Singles: White Road is the fourth released greatest hits album from the Japanese rock band, Glay. It was released on January 19, 2005. The album peaked at #1 at Oricon charts, with 411,521 sales. It was certified Double Platinum (500,000) by the Recording Industry Association of Japan (RIAJ).

== Track listing ==
1. Howaito Rōdo (White Road) (ホワイトロード)
2. Way of Difference
3. Soul Love
4. Beloved
5. Special Thanks
6. Blue Jean
7. Aitai Kimochi (逢いたい気持ち)
8. A Boy: Zutto Wasurenai (A Boy: ずっと忘れない)
9. However
10. Zutto Futari de... (ずっと2人で...)
11. Be with You
12. Winter, again
13. Toki no Shizuku (時の雫)
14. Tsuzureori: So Far and Yet So Close (つづれ織り So Far and Yet So Close)
