= Unity Roots and Family, Away =

Studio album by Glay
- Released: September 19, 2002
- Genre: Rock, pop, R&B, gospel
- Length: 59:30
- Label: Pony Canyon; Mustard/Unlimited Records
- Producer: Masahide Sakuma; Glay

Glay chronology
One Love (2001)	Unity Roots and Family, Away (2002)	Glay Rare Collectives Vol. 1 and 2 (2003)

Singles from Unity Roots and Family, Away
- 1. "Way of Difference" Released: February 27, 2002; 2. "mata koko de aimashou" Released: July 24, 2002

Unity Roots and Family, Away (also known as UR&FA) is the eighth released album from the Japanese rock band Glay. It reached #1 on Oricon charts and sold about 436,180 copies. In this album Glay takes a new turn and dabbles in genres such as gospel, R&B and blues.

== Track listing ==
1. We All Feel His Strength of Tender - 6:41
2. Mata Koko de Aimashou (またここであいましょう) - 3:54
3. Girlish Moon - 6:22
4. Way of Difference - 4:45
5. Koukai (航海) - 4:59
6. Yuruginai Monotachi (ゆるぎない者達) - 4:58
7. Natsu no Kanata e (Johnny the Unity Mix) (夏の彼方へ (Johnny the unity mix)) - 2:54
8. Neverland - 3:33
9. Karera no Holy X'mas (彼らのHOLY X'MAS) - 2:59
10. Father & Son - 4:04
11. Sotsugyou Made, Ato Sukoshi (卒業まで、あと少し) - 4:52
12. Friend of Mine - 6:04
13. All Standard Is You -End Roll- (Arranged by Glay, Masahide Sakuma, and dj honda) - 4:16
- All lyrics and compositions by Takuro, except #8 (music by Jiro), musical arrangements by Glay and Masashide Sakuma, except when noted.

== Album chart information ==
Oricon Top Ranking: #1
Weeks on: 16
Overall Glay Ranking: #8
(NOTE: Overall Glay Ranking is how it is ranked against Glay's other albums according to the Oricon)
