= The Great Vacation Vol. 2: Super Best of Glay =

Compilation album by Glay
- Released: October 21, 2009
- Genres: Power pop, pop rock
- Label: EMI Music Japan
- Producers: Glay, Masahide Sakuma

Glay chronology
The Great Vacation Vol. 1: Super Best of Glay (2009)	The Great Vacation Vol. 2: Super Best of Glay (2009)	Glay (2010)

The Great Vacation Vol.2: Super Best of Glay is a compilation album by Japanese band Glay, released on October 21, 2009. It reached #1 at Billboard Japan Top Albums chart and #1 on Oricon charts, selling sold 187,732 copies. It was certified gold for shipment of over 100,000 copies.

== Track list ==
Disc 1

1. Rain
2. Manatsu no Tobira
3. Kanojo no "Modern..."
4. Freeze My Love
5. Zutto Futari de...
6. Gone with the Wind
7. Yes, Summerdays
8. Ikiteku Tsuyosa
9. Glorious
10. Beloved
11. A Boy: Zutto Wasurenai
12. Curtain Call
13. Haru wo Aisuru Hito
14. Kuchibiru
15. However

Disc 2

1. Yuuwaku
2. Soul Love
3. Pure Soul
4. I'm in Love
5. Be with You
6. Winter, Again
7. Survival
8. Kokodewanai, Dokoka e
9. Happiness: Winter Mix
10. Tomadoi
11. Special Thanks
12. Goran, Sekai wa Kurusimi ni Michite Iruyo
13. Two Bell Silence
14. Shutter Speed No Theme
15. Acid Head
16. Burst

Disc 3

1. Great Vacation
2. Fame Is Dead
3. Absolute "Zero"
4. RainbirD
5. Let Me Be
6. Black Eyes She Had
7. Tokyo Vice Terror
8. 1988
9. Ruca
10. Omae to Tomo ni Aru
11. Real Shadow
