= One Love (Glay album) =

Studio album by Glay
- Released: November 28, 2001
- Genre: Power pop, pop rock, fusion
- Length: 72:12
- Label: Pony Canyon unlimited records
- Producer: Glay

Glay chronology
Drive: Glay Complete Best (2000)	One Love (2001)	Unity Roots and Family, Away (2002)

Singles from One Love
- 1. "Mermaid" Released: July 19, 2000; 2. "Global Communication" Released: April 25, 2001; 3. "Stay Tuned" Released: July 4, 2001; 4. "Hitohira no Jiyuu" Released: September 19, 2001

One Love is the seventh released album from the Japanese rock band Glay. This album is the first one to have song compositions from each member (except vocalist, Teru).

The single "Global Communication" quickly rose up the charts to the number one spot. It was also the main theme for their 2001 outdoor concert tour, "Glay Expo 2001 Global Communication", and the title for their Fuji Television series, Glay Global Communication. The album peaked at #1 on Oricon charts and sold about 661,460.

== Track listing ==
All lyrics and compositions by Takuro, except for #4, #11 (Lyrics and music by Jiro), #9 and #12 (Music and lyrics by Hisashi), all arrangements by Glay and Masashide Sakuma, except where noted.

1. "All Standard Is You" (Arranged by Glay, Masahide Sakuma, and DJ Honda) - 3:21
2. "Wet Dream" - 4:14
3. "Shitto (Kurid/Phantom Mix) (嫉妬 (KURID/PHANTOM mix))" - 3:36
4. "Highway No.5" - 3:11
5. "Fighting Spirit" - 5:07
6. "Hitohira no Jiyuu (Johnny the Peace Mix) (ひとひらの自由 (Johnny the peace mix))" - 6:49
7. "Think About My Daughter" - 4:05
8. "Viva Viva Viva" - 4:28
9. "Prize" - 3:08
10. "Mermaid" - 4:10
11. "Mister Popcorn" - 3:14
12. "Denki Iruka kimyou na Shikou (電気イルカ奇妙ナ嗜好)" - 2:34
13. "Stay Tuned" - 3:35
14. "Kimi ga Mitsumeta Umi (君が見つめた海)" - 4:07
15. "Muyuubyou (夢遊病)" - 3:38
16. "Christmas Ring" - 6:01
17. "Global Communication" - 4:13
18. "One Love -All Standard Is You Reprise-" (Arranged by Hisashi only) - 2:58

== Album chart information ==
Oricon Top Ranking: #1
