= Beloved (Glay album) =

Studio album by Glay
- Released: November 18, 1996
- Genres: Power pop, pop rock
- Labels: Platinum Records / PolyGram (1996); Warner Music Japan (2001); Toshiba EMI (2003)
- Producer: Glay

Glay chronology
Beat Out! (1996)	Beloved (1996)	Review (1997)

Singles from Beloved
- 1. "Beloved" Released: August 7, 1995; 2. "A Boy -Zutto Wasurenai-" Released: November 11, 1996

Beloved is the fourth album by Japanese rock/pop band Glay. It was released on November 18, 1996, and peaked at #1 at Oricon charts, with 1,522,540 copies sold. The album was certified "Million" by the Recording Industry Association of Japan (RIAJ).

== Track listing ==
1. Groovy Tour - 6:12
2. Lovers Change Fighters, Cool - 3:59
3. Beloved - 4:45
4. Shutter Speeds no Theme (SHUTTER SPEEDSのテーマ) - 3:26
5. Fairy Story - 4:06
6. Kanariya (カナリヤ) - 6:52
7. Hit the World Chart! - 5:29
8. A Boy -Zutto Wasurenai- (a Boy〜ずっと忘れない〜) - 4:52
9. Haru wo Aisuru Hito (春を愛する人) - 5:02
10. Curtain Call (カーテンコール) - 5:34
11. Miyako Wasure (都忘れ) - 5:03
12. Rhapsody - 5:18

Preceded by Globe (Globe)	Japan Record Award for the Best Album; 1997	Succeeded by Time to Destination (Every Little Thing)
