= Love Is Beautiful (album) =

Studio album by Glay
- Released: January 31, 2007
- Recorded: 2006
- Genre: Rock
- Length: 69:13
- Label: EMI Japan

Glay chronology
Ballad Best Singles: White Road (2005)	Love Is Beautiful (2007)	The Great Vacation Vol. 1: Super Best of Glay (2009)

Professional ratings
Review scores
Source	Rating
AllMusic	4/5 stars

Love Is Beautiful is the tenth album by Japanese band Glay. The album was released on January 31, 2007. It reached #1 on Oricon charts with 193,530 sales.

The album was certified Platinum by the Recording Industry Association of Japan in January 2007.

== Track listing ==
=== Standard Edition ===
No.	Title	Length
1.	"Rock'n'Roll Swindle (Album Ver.)"	4:01
2.	"Henna Yume ~Thousand Dreams~" (変な夢 〜THOUSAND DREAMS〜)	3:45
3.	"100 Mankai no Kiss" (100万回のKISS)	4:50
4.	"Natsuoto" (夏音)	5:04
5.	"American Innovation"	3:55
6.	"Answer (Album Ver.)"	5:15
7.	"Bokutachi no Shouhai" (僕達の勝敗)	5:41
8.	"Saragi no Tou" (サラギの灯)	5:49
9.	"World's End"	3:36
10.	"Scream (Album Ver.)"	4:43
11.	"Koi" (恋)	5:15
12.	"I will ~"	5:51
13.	"Layla (Album Ver.)"	5:38
14.	"Mirror"	5:50
Total length:		69:13

=== Limited Edition ===
Bonus DVD track listing

1. "Rock'n'Roll Swindle's Promotional Video"
2. "Koi's Promotional Video"
3. "Scream's Promotional Video"
4. "Answer's Promotional Video"
5. "Natsuoto's Promotional Video"
6. "100 Mankai no Kiss's Promotional Video"
7. "Love Is Beautiful Road Movie"

The Limited Edition sells with a 32-page booklet at ¥3,800(taxin)
