= Glay =

Japanese rock band

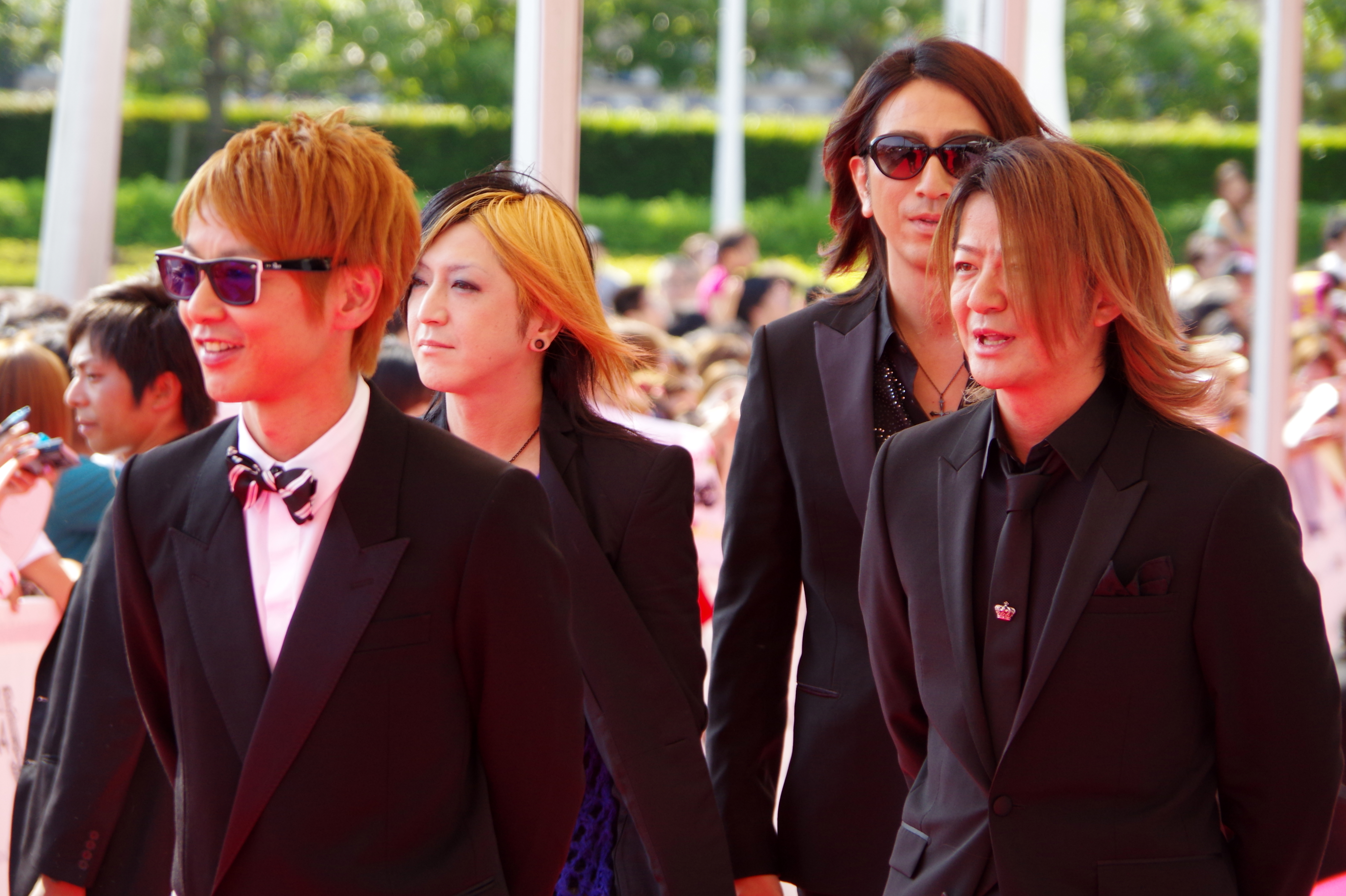
- Glay at the 2014 MTV Video Music Awards Japan. From left to right: Jiro, Hisashi, Takuro, Teru.

Background information
- Origin: Hakodate, Hokkaido, Japan
- Genres: Pop rock; power pop; progressive rock
- Works: Glay discography
- Years active: 1988–present
- Labels: Extasy; Platinum/PolyGram; Mustard/Unlimited; Pony Canyon; EMI Music Japan; Capitol; Loversoul Music & Associates / For Life Music
- Members: Teru; Takuro; Hisashi; Jiro
- Past members: Shingo; Iso; Akira; Nobumasa
- Website: www.glay.co.jp

Glay (stylized in all caps) is a Japanese rock band formed in Hakodate in 1988. The core four members, vocalist Teru, guitarists Takuro and Hisashi, and bassist Jiro, have been together since 1992. Primarily composing songs in the rock and pop genres, they have also arranged songs using elements from a variety of other genres, including progressive rock, punk, gothic rock, electronic, R&B, folk, gospel, reggae, and ska. Originally a visual kei band, the group slowly shifted to less dramatic attire through the years. With five million copies sold, Glay's 1997 compilation album Review is the fifth best-selling album of all time in Japan. Their July 1999 concert "Expo '99" at Makuhari Messe was attended by 200,000 people, making it the largest-ticketed concert ever held by a single act at the time. As of 2008, Glay had sold an estimated 51 million records; 28 million singles and 23 million albums, making them one of the top ten best-selling artists of all time in Japan.

== History ==
=== 1988–1994: Indies era ===
Glay formed in 1988 as a high school band when Takuro asked Teru, a schoolmate, to play the drums. They found a bassist but had difficulty finding a vocalist. When Teru made a tape of his singing and gave it to Takuro he was immediately recruited for the part, leaving the drums part to be filled by another person. On the search for a second guitarist, Hisashi was asked to join but declined the offer, as he was already part of a locally well-known heavy punk/rock band called Ari, which better suited his taste in music. Hisashi eventually accepted Takuro's offer and became Glay's lead guitarist after Ari disbanded in 1989. Officially, the name "Glay" was coined by Takuro and is a deliberate misspelling of the word "gray" to represent the style of music they wanted to play: a mixture between rock (black) and pop (white). However, Hisashi confirmed in an interview with Natalie that the name came from Jun Gray, a member of the punk rock band Kenzi & The Trips that he and Takuro had read about in the magazine Takarajima.

By the time of Takuro and Teru's graduation, Glay were enjoying some popularity in their hometown of Hakodate and were playing full live houses. Following Hisashi's high school graduation in 1990, the three moved to Tokyo to try to further expand their musical career. The bassist and the drummer chose to stay in Hakodate. In Tokyo, they found a completely different situation: although they had been relatively popular in their hometown, it was not easy to begin a career in Tokyo. Their concerts attracted few people, and sometimes none at all, and many live houses would not accept them because they did not fit well into either rock or pop categories. The band had to conciliate their music career to part-time jobs and faced financial problems during their first years in Tokyo.

During this time, members (particularly drummers) were constantly joining and leaving the band. When their bassist quit, Takuro knew that Jiro, who was also from Hakodate and had played with the indie band Pierrot (different from the now disbanded Pierrot, that enjoyed mainstream popularity), had moved to Tokyo and invited him to join Glay. He too, declined the offer, insisting that he was already heading in the right direction for himself. It wasn't until Takuro asked him to play at just one show to fill in for their missing bassist that he decided to go. Following that show, Jiro continued to receive invitations to play with Glay, and eventually he became Glay's official bass player, finalizing the official four member lineup in August 1992.

They promoted the band by handing out flyers on the street and giving out demo tapes. Eventually they became better known on the Tokyo live house circuit and began drawing larger crowds. Eventually, hide of X Japan gave one of Glay's demos to his bandmate Yoshiki. During an October 1993 show, Yoshiki and his entourage came to watch and offered the band a contract to his record label Extasy Records. Their debut single, "Rain", and their first album, Hai to Diamond, were both released on May 25, 1994.

=== 1995–2000: Record-setting success ===
After the time of their debut, Glay steadily became more popular. Their 4th single "Freeze My Love" made it onto the Oricon Top 20, debuting at No. 19. Two months later their second album, Speed Pop, peaked at No. 8. It was their first album released on Platinum Records, a division of PolyGram that Yoshiki founded that same year. Their first No. 1 hit was in 1996 with their third album Beat Out!, which was marked as a major turning point in Glay's career. Released later that same year, the fourth album Beloved was their first album to sell over 1 million copies. In September 1996, Glay played the final concert of the Beat Out! Reprise Tour at Nippon Budokan, their first concert at the venue, which is stated by them to have been their biggest dream coming true. In August 1997, their 12th single "However" remained at the top of the charts for two weeks in a row and, after it was displaced by Zard's single "Eien" for one week, it re-appeared at the top position for another three weeks.

In the period between 1997 and 2000, Glay produced six million-selling singles, being the third artist with most million-selling singles of all time. Their 13th single "Yuuwaku" topped Oricon yearly single ranking in 1998. In 1999, their 16th single "Winter, Again" was number two of the year and won the 41st Japan Record Awards "Grand Prix" award, which is considered the most important Japanese music award. Their albums were also massively successful; both Pure Soul (1998) and Heavy Gauge (1999), along with the compilation album Drive - Glay Complete Best (2000), sold more than two million copies each.

The impact of their popularity was such that, in 1998, Japan's telephone service was temporarily put out of order due to the mass number of fans trying to reserve tickets to their upcoming tour. The 1998 Winter Olympics were being held, and press coverage of the event became chaotic because of the incident.

In this period, the band won several prizes and established records. In 1997, their compilation album Review - Best of Glay stayed for five weeks in a row at the top position of the Oricon chart and became the all-time best-selling album in Japan at the time, with almost 5 million copies sold. Their 1999 video Survival sold approximately 900,000 copies and is the all-time best-selling video/DVD. In the same year, their first "Expo" concert would lure a record audience of 200,000 people (see "Glay Expos" below).

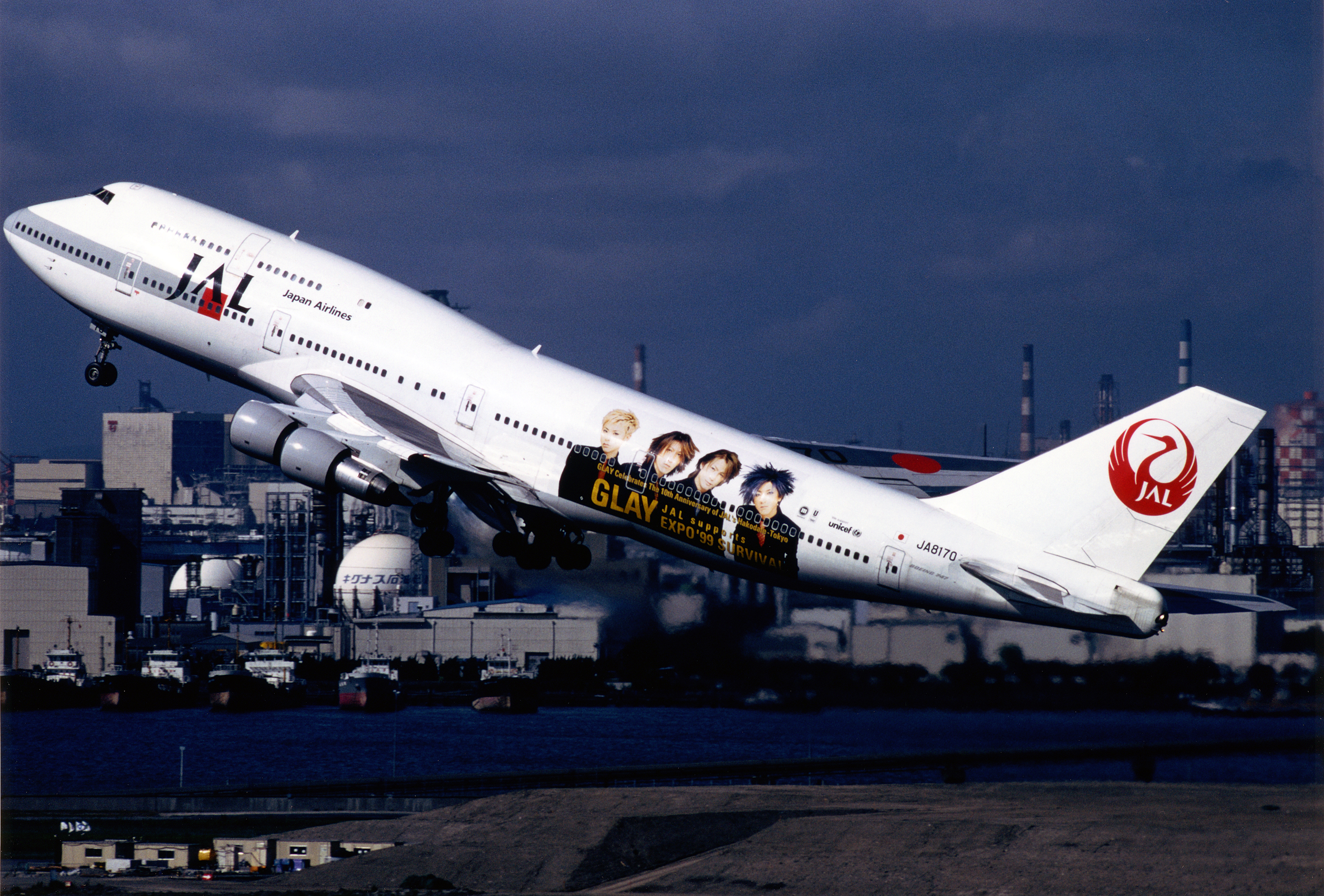
A Japan Airlines Boeing 747 featuring Glay Expo '99 Survival livery

1999 was the year Glay played their first dome tour, Glay Dome Tour "pure soul" 1999, which made the band the first to hold a consecutive 5 day "dome" concert. This tour had a total of 15 performances in four venues and attracted a total audience of 750,000 people. Glay closed the year of 1999, playing the concert The Millennium Eve - A Christmas Present for the People Who Love Live a Lot, a joint concert with Luna Sea, on December 23, and the Glay Countdown Live in Messe "Come Together" concert on December 31.

Takuro described the "Expo'99" as a dream come true. When the album Heavy Gauge was released, in October 1999, Takuro wrote a diary entry in Glay's official home page, describing the album as a representation of his feelings at that moment. His feelings were not of happiness, but of "emptiness" and not knowing what to do after "doing everything" they wanted to. The album is seen as a first step to a new direction in the band's career. The band considered disbanding in 2000, after releasing their second compilation album, which was a suggestion made by fellow singer Yuki Isoya, whose group Judy and Mary had disbanded.

=== 2001–2003 ===
After this period of massive success and a considerably steady style in their music, Glay's work took a turn in 2001. Their 2001 album One Love got mixed feelings among the fans, due to its disparities to their earlier works, with a different, generally poppier and experimental sound, and songs that had reggae and R&B influences. Their 2002 album Unity Roots and Family, Away, which was almost completely made of slow-paced songs and also had elements from other types of music (gospel, rap and traditional Okinawan music), was not welcomed by most fans.

In spite of the "cold" reception these works had, the band reached No. 1 spot in the charts with both albums. Glay continued being successful with their tours in Japan. They proved to enjoy popularity outside Japan as well, in 2001, when members visited Thailand, Hong Kong, Taiwan and Korea to promote the Expo 2001 "Global Communication" and officially invited artists Dome, Nicholas Tse, Mayday and Jaurim to participate in one of the Expo concerts. The next year, they played outside Japan for the first time (not counting one concert in Hawaii for their fanclub members), when they played a sold-out live performance for a 35,000 audience in Beijing. The concert is the most expensive in China's history. Glay also met then-CCP General Secretary Jiang Zemin.

In 2003, they made a contract transfer from Pony Canyon to Toshiba EMI, the most expensive transfer in Japan's history, at 4 billion yen. Under the new company, Glay released their first DVD—single "Itsuka" and their first B-Side compilation albums, Rare Collectives Vol.1 and Rare Collectives Vol. 2.

Also in 2003, an art gallery dedicated to Glay was opened in their hometown, Hakodate. "Art Style of Glay" was located in the Winning Hall, a famous building in the city and remained open until 2007.

=== 2004: 10th Anniversary ===
In 2004, Glay had several activities to celebrate their 10th anniversary since their major debut. As a start to this celebration, Glay presented the concert Rock Shock vol. 3 in 2003. The name was taken from an indie festival organized by Glay in 1989, which had had two editions. In March of that year, they released their 9th studio album, The Frustrated, and in order to promote the album, the band held the Glay Concert Tour 2004 X-Rated and later, in October, the Glay Arena Tour 2004 "The Frustrated" -Extreme-.

On July 27 they played a "pre-Expo" concert at Universal Studios Japan and on July 31, they played the third edition of the Glay Expo, which was the main event of the year by the band. At the end of the year, they held the fan-club exclusive Countdown Live in Messe "Come Together" on December 31. They finished the 10th anniversary celebration with the release of the compilation Ballad Best Singles: White Road in January 2005 and with the 10th Anniversary Year Final Glay Dome Tour 2005 "White Road" which finished with the Glay 10th Anniversary Year Final Glay Osaka 4 Days Special 2005 "White Road".

=== 2005–2006: Rebirth ===
In 2005, after years of touring, promoting, and recording, the four took a hiatus. Their only new release as a group was the single "Scream", their first collaboration work, with the vocal–dance group Exile. "Scream", which was released under Exile's record company, was the fifth bestselling single of the year.

During that time, Jiro created a side band with the pillows guitarist Sawao Yamanaka and Straightener's drummer Nakayama Shinpei called The Predators, in the summer of 2005. The Predators played in summer festivals and released the mini-album Hunting!. Teru and Hisashi formed a band called Rally with The Mad Capsule Markets drummer Motokatsu and bassist Koji Ueno from Thee Michelle Gun Elephant. Rally contributed a cover of Buck-Tick's "Aku no Hana" for the tribute CD Parade -Respective Tracks of Buck-Tick-.

Although it was believed that Glay took a break as a group to take a rest, it was later reported in the news that the band had split from their former agency, Unlimited Group. The reasons were obscure, but the event managed to delay the band's work. The band refers to it as a time when they "couldn't move forward" and "had thoughts of quitting". Cyzo magazine's October 2005 issue had reported Glay's management dispute and referred to it as a media taboo.

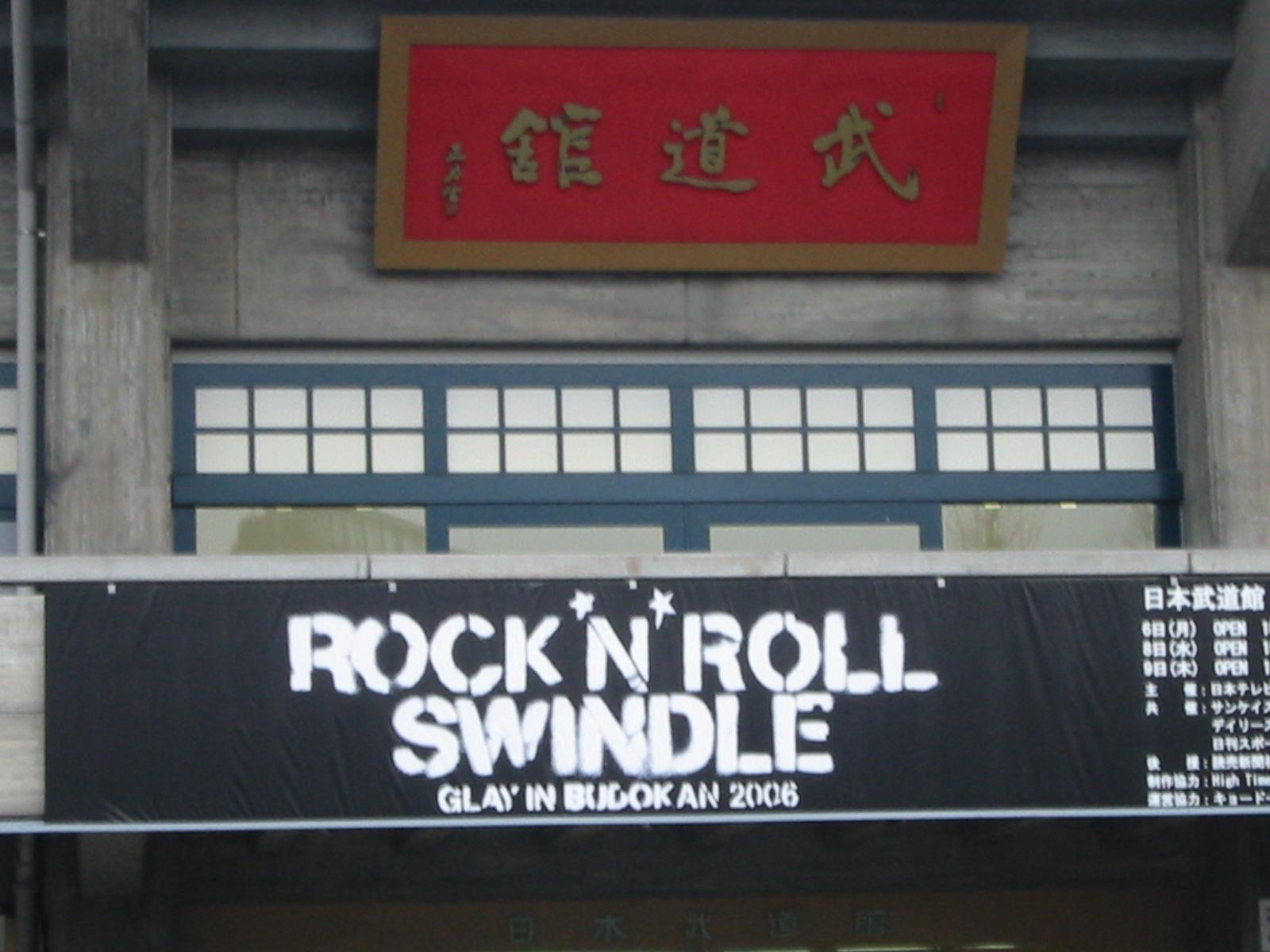
The front of the Nippon Budokan in 2006, advertising Glay's Rock 'n' Roll Swindle concerts

In February 2006, Glay ended their silence by having a two-day live performance in Zepp Tokyo and a three-day live performance at Nippon Budokan, titled Rock 'n' Roll Swindle, which was produced as an independent event. Here, they played many of their old songs and introduced two new written songs as their new sound. It was the start of a campaign called "Re-Birth" to promote the band's return to the music scene. Posters of their "dead" faces were displayed around the city of Tokyo and a movie of the "old" Glay burial by the "new" Glay was shown on television during the commercial breaks. Takuro founded his own office, called Lover Soul, but the band signed with Amuse, the office of Southern All Stars's Keisuke Kuwata, in 2006 until the new office was established.

On July 12, 2006, they released a new single titled "G4" after a year and seven months away from the limelight, returning to their rock and roll roots. In the following month, they collaborated with former Boowy vocalist Kyosuke Himuro in their single "Answer". Together, they performed "Answer" in Kyosuke Himuro + Glay Swing Addiction 2006. In August, Glay performed at Southern All Stars's summer concert Mujintou alongside various artists. In September, "Natsuoto/Henna Yume -Thousand Dreams-" was released, with "Natsuoto" being the theme song to TV show Koi suru Hanikami.

Following the release of these singles was their tour, Rock 'n' Roll Swindle -Re-Birth- from November 2006 to early 2007.

=== 2007–2008 ===
On January 31, 2007, Glay released their tenth full-length studio album, Love is Beautiful, containing 14 tracks, which reached No. 1 spot and was their 10th album to do so, Until then, Glay had been the all-male band with most No. 1 albums in Japan, but later that year Mr. Children would replace them. Following the release of this album, the band began an arena tour, titled after the album.

Although there was not much to promote, Glay was very active as a live band. Over the summer of 2007, they performed at the 15th Anniversary Cue Music Jam-Boree in Yubari on July 1 and produced the "Rock Shock. Vol. 4" on August 23, 2007. They revived the side projects: Jiro's band, The Predators, performed at the Rising Sun Rock Festival in Ezo on August 17 and 18 while Teru and Hisashi's side band, Rally, performed at the "Buck-Tick Fest 2007" in September. Glay also performed the Highcommunications Tour 2007-2008 from November 2007 to March 2008.

As of 2008, the band continued the series of shows with the concerts Rock Shock vol. 5, in Zepp Fukuoka, on April 19 and AP Bank Fes '08 on July 19 and 20. In August, they performed for the first time in the United States. The Verb tour 2008 in U.S. was held at The Fillmore, in San Francisco, on August 12, and at the House of Blues, in Los Angeles, on August 15 and 16, 2008.

On September 21, the band appeared in a concert by Kyosuke Himuro held in Hokkaido. In December, the band continued their Glay Verb Tour in Japan, with four concerts in Zepp Sendai, Zepp Osaka, Zepp Nagoya, and Zepp Tokyo for their fan-club members. On December 30 and 31 they played the Glay Verb Tour Final "Come Together" 2008–2009, the third edition of their year-end countdown concerts.

=== 2009: 15th anniversary ===
In 2009, Glay celebrated 15 years since the release of their debut single "Rain". In January 2009, the band announced several concert tours during the year and two special concerts at the Nissan Stadium in August.

The first commemorative release was the 6 track single "Say Your Dream" on March 4, 2009. The title song is 13 minutes long and is reported to be a song about Glay's history. Takuro reported that he approached this song as the message he would like to leave if he were to die, and that it took seven years to be completed. The promotional video was divided into two parts, the first of them started broadcasting on TV channels five days before the release of the single. The second part remains accessible on internet only through a pass code obtained with the limited edition of the single. On the same premium site, there is a PV of the coupling song "Haru made wa". The single finishes Glay's series of western song covers with "The Meaning of Life" by the band The Offspring.

During April, the band held five concerts produced by the members, titled Glay Member Produced Live 2009 - The Great Vacation- Extra-. On April 8 and 9, the band played two concerts for official fanclub "Happy Swing" members who also have been affiliated with the fanclub for over 10 years at NHK Hall. The concerts were produced by Takuro. Teru produced another edition of the "men only night" concert (as he had done in 1999), which was held on April 13 at Studio Coast. Jiro produced a "pair only" concert, which was played on April 15 at the Osaka Hall, and, on April 17, Hisashi produced Resonance Vol. 2, which was broadcast by Yahoo!douga.

On May 25, 2009, the day Glay completed 15 years since their debut, the band released the single "I am XXX". The song was used as the main theme for the movie Blood: The Last Vampire around Asia, chosen by producer Bill Kong. On June 10, 2009, Glay released the greatest hits collection The Great Vacation Vol. 1 - Super Best of Glay, a triple CD containing most of their singles released after 2000, and a re-recorded version of 1998's "Yuuwaku" in the 2 first CDs, while the third CD was mostly composed of unreleased songs.

During the period between June 15 and July 6 the band held the Glay Hall Tour 2009 - The Great Vacation, prior to their two date Glay 15th Anniversary Special Live 2009 The Great Vacation in Nissan Stadium, held on August 15 and 16, which gathered a total of 150 thousand people and cost 1.5 billion yen.

In September, Glay returned to the U.S. and held The Great Vacation U.S. Tour in California. The band played at The Fillmore, in San Francisco, on September 9 and at the House of Blues on September 11 and 12.

On October 21, 2009, Glay released the second part of their greatest hits collection The Great Vacation Vol. 2 - Super Best of Glay, another triple CD containing hit singles from 1994 to 2000 and re-recorded versions of "Acid Head", "Shutter Speeds no Teema" and "Burst", as well as a remastering of older tracks. The third disc was another collection of unreleased songs.

On October 22, 2009, a Tokyo court ruled in favor of Glay over the ownership of 147 songs and ordered Unlimited Records to pay them 670 million yen for back royalties and unpaid contract fees. This was the issue that started in 2005 wherein royalties to Glay have ceased to be provided, leading the four-man band to seek termination of their contract with the company.

=== 2010–2013: Loversoul Music & Associates ===
On April 1, 2010, Glay released "Apologize", a free digital single that, according to Takuro, was a signal of gratitude to the fans. In June, the band announced the establishment of their own label, Loversoul Music & Associates. Their first work under their new label was the single "Precious", released on September 8, followed by their tenth studio album Glay, released on October 13. From June 2010 to February 2011 the band performed their Live Tour 2010-2011 Rock Around the World in several halls and arenas in Japan.

Glay's song "Winter, Again" was covered by 12012 on the compilation Crush! -90's V-Rock Best Hit Cover Songs-, which was released on January 26 and features current visual kei bands covering songs from bands that were important to the '90s visual kei movement. Their song "Yuuwaku" was covered by Hero on its sequel, Crush! 2 -90's V-Rock Best Hit Cover Songs-, released on November 23, 2011.

In March 2011, Glay released the albums; Rare Collectives Vol. 3 and Rare Collectives Vol. 4. Each volume is a double CD set containing the B-sides of all their singles released since 2003, as well as unreleased tracks. In May, the band released the video Rock Around the World 2010–2011 of the final concert of the tour performed at Saitama Super Arena. In November, Glay released the 3-song maxi-single My Private "Jealousy", which included a cover of the Neon Genesis Evangelion theme song, "A Cruel Angel's Thesis".

In May 2012, Glay released the 3-song maxi-single Bible. The title track served as the theme song for the band's two-day Hotel Glay concert at Nagai Stadium, held July 28 and 29. Bible also included the CD version of the song "Thank you for your love", which was written in support of victims of the 2011 Japan Earthquake and Tsunami. In December, the band released two simultaneous singles: "Justice [from] Guilty", a rock track written by Hisashi, and "Unmeiron", a ballad composed by Jiro.

In July 2013, Glay released "Dark River", the theme song for the TV series Gekiryu - Watashi wo Oboeteimasuka?, starring Japanese actress Rena Tanaka. In November, they followed up with the single "Diamond Skin", produced by The Plastics' Masahide Sakuma.

=== 2014–2016: Anniversary anthologies, Ace of Diamond, Music Life ===
To celebrate their 20th anniversary, Glay released their 26-song 2CD+DVD Hai to Diamond Anthology in May 2014, which included remixed and remastered versions of previously released songs as well as demo tracks, radio show recordings, and music videos from their indie era. The band's October double-A-side single, "Hyakka Ryoran"/"Hashire! Mirai", included the third opening song for the anime series Ace of Diamond, and in November, they released their thirteenth album Music Life, which was also available as a 2-disc limited edition including the bonus CD Ballade Best Melodies, featuring their best ballads selected by fan voting. Music Life's cover image was inspired by The Beatles album Revolver.

In 2015, Glay created their second theme song for the Ace of Diamond series, "Heroes". In October, they released the special-edition Speed Pop Anthology, which contained 27 songs including demos and remasters from the original 1995 album plus a documentary.

In January 2016, the band released their third Ace of Diamond theme, "Sora ga Aozora de aru Tame ni", followed by a set of theme songs, "Deathtopia" and "Chou Onsoku Destiny", for the anime series Kuromukuro, which were packaged as a double-A-side release in August. One month later BEAT out! Anthology was released in September to commemorate the band's first number one ranking on the Oricon chart. Along with remixed and remastered tracks, the special edition contained 2 full-length 1996 concert videos from Shibuya Public Hall and Nippon Budokan.

=== 2017–2018: Summerdelics and Asian tour ===
In July 2017, Glay released their 14th album Summerdelics, which reached number 1 on the Oricon album chart, followed by a national arena tour. In September 2017, they released the special edition Beloved Anthology set, which included 14 songs remastered by Michael Zimmering, 15 previously unreleased demo tracks, and a video documentary including segments shot by Yutaka Onaga on location in Iceland in 1996.

In November 2017, Glay released the EP Winterdelics, which included "Anata to ikite yuku", the theme song for the TV Tokyo drama Universal Kokokusha - Anata no Jinsei, Urikomimasu!

In 2018, Glay toured Asia, collaborating on stage with Taiwanese band Mayday and performed the 900th concert of their career in Hong Kong.

== Influences ==
Teru cited Boøwy and Southern All Stars as his two biggest influences, and named Kyosuke Himuro and Miles Hunt as his favorite musicians. Takuro cited the Beatles as his biggest influence, while Hisashi named Nuno Bettencourt as his. Jiro cited Flea and Kurt Cobain as some of his biggest influences, and named Lenny Kravitz, John Frusciante, Duff McKagan, Nikki Sixx, Chad Smith and Tommy Lee as among his favorite musicians.

== Members ==
- Takuro – guitar, bandleader (1988–present)
- Teru – vocals, drums (1988–present)
- Hisashi – lead guitar (1989–present)
- Jiro – bass (1992–present)

Former members

- Shingo – bass, drums (1990–1992)
- Iso – drums (1992)
- Akira Ueshima – drums (1992–1994)
- Nobumasa Ohba – drums (1994–1995)

=== Support members ===
- Toshimitsu "Toshi" Nagai – drums (1995–present)
- Seiichiro Nagai – keyboards (2007–present)

Former support members

- Daijiro "D.I.E." Nozawa – keyboards (1995–1998)
- Shigeo "Shige/sk55" Komori – keyboards (1998–2004)
- Yuta Saitou – keyboards (2004–2005)
- Masahide Sakuma – guitar, keyboards, producer (mid-1994–2014, deceased)

== Glay Expos ==
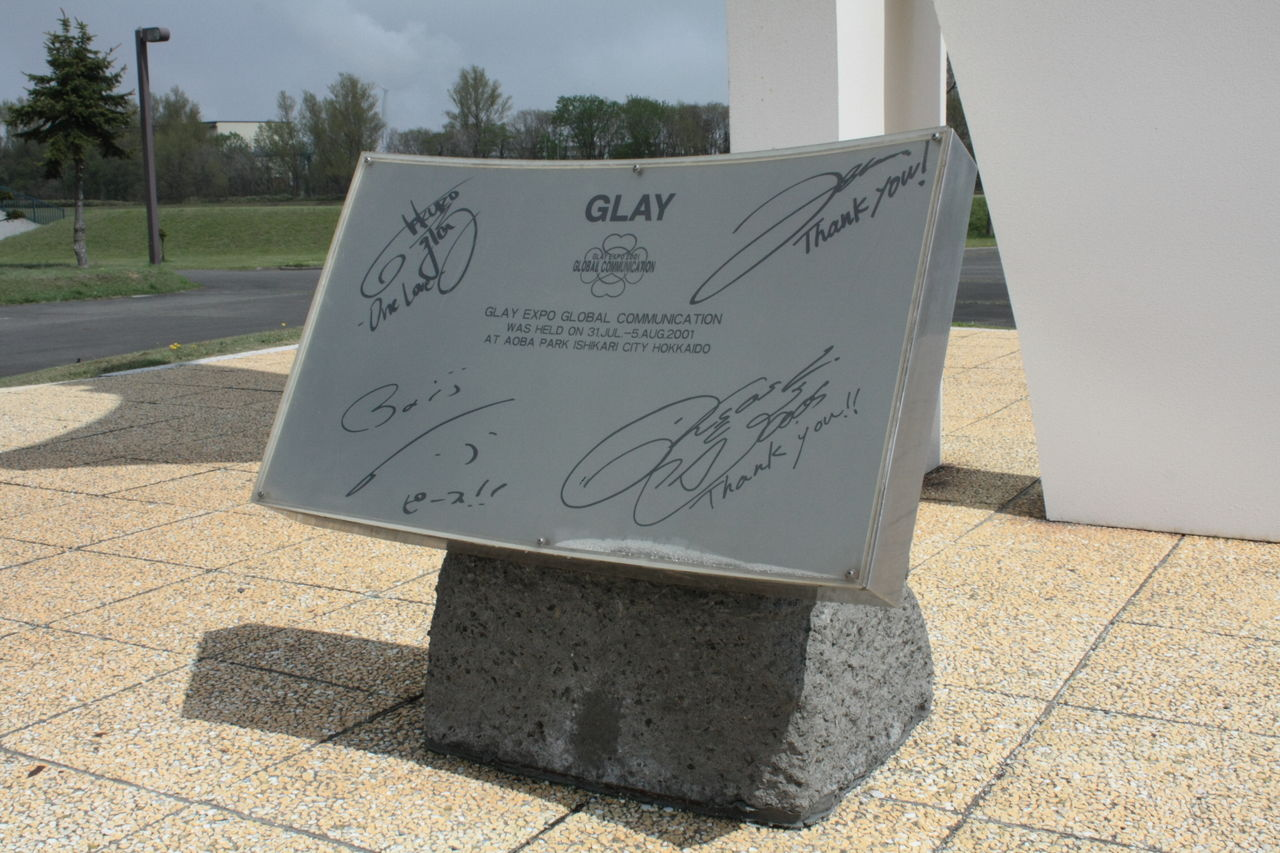
A plaque in Ishikari commemorating the 2001 Glay Expo

Glay occasionally holds an exposition and concert called Glay Expo, which is always expensively produced and lures greater audiences than their normal stadium concerts. The first edition of the event was held on July 31, 1999. The Glay Expo '99 Survival, held in the parking lot of Makuhari Messe, gathered a total audience of 200,000 people, making it the largest-ticketed concert ever held by a single act, certified by Guinness World Records.

The second edition was held in 2001. Glay Expo 2001 "Global Communication" was divided into four performances: two in Tokyo, one in Ishikari, and an all-night long performance in Fukuoka, which featured artists; Dome from Thailand, Nicholas Tse from Hong Kong, Mayday from Taiwan, Jaurim from South Korea, and The D.e.p., a group formed by Glay's producer Masahide Sakuma, Taiwanese singer Vivian Hsu, Gota Yashiki, Masami Tsuchiya and Mick Karn. These concerts accumulated a total audience of over 280,000. The concert in Ishikari had part of its fuel generated from solar and aeolic energy generating devices displayed in a booth.

July 2004 had three Glay Expo 2004 in "The Frustrated" shows. The latter two celebrating their 10th anniversary were held in the parking lot of Universal Studios Japan and sold out the 100,000 tickets in under 15 minutes. 2014 had two Glay Expos in September, the second celebrated the band's 20th anniversary and brought 55,000 fans to Miyagi Stadium.

== Media exposure and works outside music ==
Glay has appeared on several TV programs and front covers of many famous music magazines in Japan, such as Gigs, What's In?, BPass, Ongaku to Hito, PatiPati, Newsmaker, etc. Kadokawa Shoten has also produced two "Glay only" special edition books.

They have starred in several campaigns for various products, as clothes, chocolate, and Mini Discs. To promote the "Expo '99", at the peak of their mainstream popularity, they had their faces printed on the sides of Japan Airlines jumbo jets, the sponsor of the event. The campaign was also a celebration of the 10th anniversary of the Tokyo-Hakodate route. In 2002, they starred another campaign for Japan Airlines, promoting travel between Japan and China.

Each member of Glay, except Teru, has written a book (Jiro has written two and Takuro, three). In 2001, as a part of their "Expo 2001" preparation, they presented the TV show Glay Global Communication. Besides appearing in magazines and on TV, all of them have participated in their own weekly radio shows. As of 2008, only Teru and Jiro keep their radio-shows (aired on BayFM and FM802, respectively). In January 2009, Hisashi started his first TV regular segment "RX-72 -Hisashi (Glay) VS Junichi Mogi-", every last Monday of each month on the Music-On TV channel. Takuro has also started a web radio-show, Takuro Mobile Meeting.

== Humanitarian and environmental works ==
Besides performing in charity festivals as the "Red Ribbon Live" (in which Teru has participated since 2005), the "White Band Fes" in 2005, the "Re-style Live" (organized by the DJ Hisashi Yamada) and the "AP Bank Fes" in 2008, Glay, specially Teru and Takuro, have been actively participating in different causes.

In 2001, Takuro along with Ryuichi Sakamoto started "Artists Power", an organization of artists who want to be active in the research on renewable energy. The two started talking about this project when they worked in Sakamoto's charity project Zero Landmine and the first event linked to it was the Ishikari leg of the "Glay Expo 2001" (see "Glay Expo" above). AP Bank, which was founded by Mr. Children's Kazutoshi Sakurai, composer Takeshi Kobayashi and Sakamoto, is linked to this organization; "AP" stands for both "Artists Power" and "Alternative Power".

Teru has been engaged with the "Red Ribbon Link Project" since 2005 and has become an active spokesperson for the project. In 2008, he starred a HIV awareness campaign with posters and a commercial in which he had his own blood tested.

In 2011, after Eastern Japan was affected by the 9.0 magnitude Tōhoku earthquake and tsunami, Glay joined other artists in making donations for victim relief. The band donated 20 million yen to the "Asahi Shimbun Social Welfare Organization". Takuro also made a donation of 10 million yen to "Mudef" (Music Design Foundation), an organization that aims at the accomplishment of all the United Nations Organization 8 MDGs (Millennium Development Goals) and seeks to help out people all over the world through music and arts. Takuro is also a board member along with singer Misia. Teru wrote and recorded a song called "Thank You for Your Love" to send a message of support to the victims and released it via Twitter. The song was re-recorded and was released as a download-only track with its profits donated to the Japanese Red Cross.

== Discography ==
Studio albums

- Hai to Diamond (灰とダイヤモンド; 1994)
- Speed Pop (1995)
- Beat Out! (1996)
- Beloved (1996)
- Pure Soul (1998)
- Heavy Gauge (1999)
- One Love (2001)
- Unity Roots and Family, Away (2002)
- The Frustrated (2004)
- Love Is Beautiful (2007)
- Glay (2010)
- Justice/Guilty (2013)
- Music Life (2014)
- Summerdelics (2017)
- No Democracy (2019)
- Freedom Only (2021)
- Back to the Pops (2024)
- Tabisuru Riyū wo Machinagara (2026)

== Video games ==
- Glay Complete Works (Sony PlayStation, April 16, 1999)

== Awards ==
- 1996
  - 29th All Japan Cable Broadcast Awards "Gold Request Award" - "Beloved"
- 1997
  - 30th All Japan Cable Broadcast Awards "Grand Prize"
  - 30th Japan Cable Broadcast Awards "Grand Prize" - "However"
  - 39th Annual Japan Record Awards "Grand Prize - Album" - Beloved
  - 39th Annual Japan Record Awards " Best Album" - Beloved
  - 39th Annual Japan Record Awards "Excellent work prize" - "However"
- 1998
  - 35th Golden Arrow Awards "Grand Prize"
  - World Music Awards "Best Selling Japanese Artist"
  - 12th Annual Japan Gold Disc Award "Rock Album of the Year"
  - 12th Annual Japan Gold Disc Award "Musical Video of the Year"
  - 12th Annual Japan Gold Disc Award "Artist of the Year - Grand Prize"
  - 40th Annual Japan Record Awards "Best Album" - Pure Soul
  - 40th Annual Japan Record Awards "Excellent work prize" - "Soul Love"
- 1999
  - 13th Annual Japan Gold Disc Awards "Song Of The Year" - "Yuuwaku"
  - 13th Annual Japan Gold Disc Award "Song Of The Year" - "Soul Love"
  - 13th Annual Japan Gold Disc Award "Song Of The Year" - "Be with You"
  - 13th Annual Japan Gold Disc Award "Rock Album Of The Year" - Pure Soul
  - Grand Prize winner at the "32nd All Japan Cable Broadcast Awards" - "Winter, Again"
  - 32nd Japan Cable Broadcast Awards "Most Requested Artist"
  - 41st Annual Japan Record Awards "Best single - Grand Prize" - "Winter, Again"
  - 41st Annual Japan Record Awards "Excellent work prize" - "Winter, Again"
- 2000
  - 14th Annual Japan Gold Disc Award "Song Of The Year" - "Kokodeha nai Dokoka"
  - 14th Annual Japan Gold Disc Award "Song Of The Year" - "Winter, Again"
  - 14th Annual Japan Gold Disc Award "Rock Album Of The Year" - Heavy Gauge
- 2001
  - 15th Annual Japan Gold Disc Award "Song Of The Year" - "Tomadoi/Special Thanks"
  - 15th Annual Japan Gold Disc Award "Rock Album Of The Year" - Drive -Glay complete Best-
- 2003
  - 16th Annual Japan Gold Disc Award "Song Of The Year" - "Way of Difference"
- 2005
  - Special prize for their career at the "Space Shower Music Video Awards"
- 2006
  - 20th Annual Japan Gold Disc Award "Song of the Year" - "Scream" (Glay x Exile)
- 2009
  - Short Shorts Video Festival and Asia 2009 "Best Music Short" - "Say Your Dream"

== See also ==
- List of best-selling music artists in Japan
