= Speed Pop =

Studio album by Glay
- Released: March 3, 1995
- Genres: Power pop, alternative rock
- Length: 62:00
- Labels: Platinum Records / PolyGram (1995); Warner Music Japan (2001); Toshiba EMI (2003)
- Producers: Masahide Sakuma; Masami Tsuchiya; Yoshiki

Glay chronology
Hai to Diamond (1994)	Speed Pop (1995)	Beat Out! (1996)

Singles from Speed Pop
- 1. "Rain" Released: May 25, 1994; 2. "Manatsu no Tobira" Released: June 15, 1994; 3. "Kanojo no "Modern..."" Released: November 16, 1994; 4. "Freeze My Love" Released: January 25, 1995; 5. "Zutto Futari de..." Released: May 17, 1995

Speed Pop is the second album by Japanese rock band Glay. It is the band's major label debut album, was released on March 3, 1995, and peaked at #8 at Oricon charts, with 320,150 copies sold.

== Overview ==
Takuro wrote "Innocence" when he was 16-years-old, and "Rain" when he was 17.

Former drummer Akira appears on tracks 9 and 10, which originally appeared on their debut album along with "Rain". Masami Tsuchiya and Yūji Kawashima also contributed electric guitar and synthesizer to these new versions of those two songs respectively. Masafumi Minato (Saber Tiger and Dead End) performs on tracks 3 and 7.

The album's cover art features John William Waterhouse's painting, The Lady of Shalott.

The Speed Pop Gig '95 tour featured eleven shows, beginning on April 2 at Nissin Power Station and ending on June 12 at Shibuya Public Hall.

== Track listing ==
All tracks written and composed by Takuro except track 1, composed by Masahide Sakuma, and track 12, written by Yoshiki and composed by Takuro and Yoshiki.

1. "Speed Pop (Introduction)" - 1:20
2. "Happy Swing" - 5:12
3. "Kanojo no "Modern..." (彼女の "Modern…")" - 4:29
4. "Zutto Futari de... (ずっと2人で…)" - 7:06
5. "Love Slave" - 4:17
6. "Regret" - 4:53
7. "Innocence" - 6:16
8. "Freeze My Love" - 5:33
9. "Manatsu no Tobira (真夏の扉)" - 5:07
10. "Life -Tooi Sora no Shita de- (Life ～遠い空の下で～)" - 6:53
11. "Junk Art" - 4:34
12. "Rain" - 6:45

== Personnel ==
- Masahide Sakuma – mandolin, saxophone, trumpet, recorder, organ, acoustic piano, synthesizer, electric and acoustic guitar (2–8, 11), string arrangements (1–11), computer programming (1–11)
- Soul Toul – drums (tracks 2, 4–6, 8, 11)
- Masafumi Minato – drums (3 & 7)
- Akira – drums (9 & 10)
- Mike Baird – drums (12)
- Yūji Kawashima – synthesizer (9 & 10)
- Masami Tsuchiya – electric guitar (9 & 10)
- Yoshiki – piano & string arrangements (12)
