= Review (Glay album) =

Greatest hits album by Glay
- Released: October 10, 1997
- Genre: Power pop
- Length: 132:33
- Label: Platinum Records / PolyGram
- Producer: Masahide Sakuma; Glay

Glay chronology
Beloved (1996)	Review (1997)	Pure Soul (1998)

Review is the first greatest hits album by Japanese rock band Glay. It was released on October 10, 1997, and contains the band's most popular songs from their 1994 album Hai to Diamond to their fourth album Beloved. The album sold over 2,003,000 copies in the first week of release, debuting at number-one on the Japanese Oricon Albums Chart. It remained in the top position for five consecutive weeks. Review was certified for five million copies sold by the Recording Industry Association of Japan in December 1998, making it the third best-selling album in Japanese history.

== Track listing ==
1. Guroriasu (Glorious) (グロリアス)
2. Kanojo no "Modern..." (彼女の "Modern…")
3. Beloved
4. More Than Love
5. Sen no Knife ga Mune wo Sasu (千ノナイフガ胸ヲ刺ス)
6. Zutto Futari de... (ずっと2人で...)
7. Kuchibiru (口唇)
8. Rhapsody
9. However
10. Freeze My Love
11. Kissin' Noise
12. Kiseki no Hate (軌跡の果て)
