= Winter, Again =

Single by Glay

from the album Heavy Gauge
- Released: February 3, 1999
- Genre: Alternative rock
- Length: 5:13
- Label: Mustard/Unlimited
- Producers: Glay, Masahide Sakuma

Glay singles chronology
"'Be with You'" (1998)	"Winter, Again" (1999)	"'Survival'" (1999)

"Winter, Again" is the 16th single by Japanese band Glay. It reached #1 on the weekly Oricon charts and sold 1,638,120 copies in 1999, becoming the #2 single of the year. It charted for 18 weeks and sold a total of 1,642,530 copies, becoming Glay's best-selling single. The title song was used as the East Japan Railway "SKI SKI" CM song.

== Awards ==
- Grand Prize winner at the "32nd Japan Cable Broadcast Awards"
- 41st Annual Japan Record Awards "Grand Prix"

== Covers by other musicians ==
Glay's song "Winter, Again" was covered by 12012 on the compilation Crush! -90's V-Rock Best Hit Cover Songs-. The album was released on January 26, 2011, and features current visual kei bands covering songs from bands that were important to the '90s visual kei movement.

== Track list ==
1. Winter, Again
2. Young Oh! Oh!
3. Hello My Life
4. Winter, Again (instrumental)
