= However (song) =

Single by Glay

from the album Review
- Released: August 6, 1997
- Genre: Pop rock, power pop, progressive rock
- Label: Platinum Records
- Producer(s): Glay, Masahide Sakuma

Glay singles chronology
"'Kuchibiru'" (1997)	"However" (1997)	"'Yuuwaku'" (1998)

However is the 12th single release by Japanese band Glay on August 6, 1997. It debuted at #1 on the Oricon chart, appearing at that position for 5 weeks in total, selling 1,341,980 copies.

The title song was used as the ending song for the TV drama "Ryakudatsu Ai Abunai Onna" (略奪愛・アブない女, lit. "Despoiled Love: Dangerous Woman") aired on TBS channel, whose opening theme was another Glay song, "Freeze My Love", and all the music was instrumental versions of Glay's songs.

== Awards ==
- Grand Prize winner at the "30th Japan Cable Broadcast Awards"
- 39th Annual Japan Record Awards "Excellent work prize"

== Covers by other musicians ==
"However" has been recorded by Kiyoshi Maekawa in his album Ballad Selection, in 1999, and by Ayumi Nakamura in her album Voice, in 2008. Debbie Gibson recorded an English-language cover of the song in her 2010 Japan-only release Ms. Vocalist.

== Track listing ==
1. However
2. I'm Yours
