= Yuuwaku =

Single by Glay

from the album Pure Soul
- B-side: "Little Lovebirds"; "Yuuwaku" (Instrumental)
- Released: April 29, 1998
- Genre: Pop rock; power pop; progressive rock; alternative rock
- Label: Platinum Records
- Producers: Glay; Masahide Sakuma

Glay singles chronology
"'However'" (1997)	"Yuuwaku" (1998)	"'Soul Love'" (1998)

Music video
- "Yuuwaku" on YouTube

"Yuuwaku" (Japanese: 誘惑; "Temptation") is the 13th single by the Japanese pop rock band Glay. It reached No. 1 on the Oricon Weekly Singles Chart and sold 1,611,920 copies in 1998, becoming the best-selling single of the year in Japan. It charted for 20 weeks and sold a total of 1,625,520 copies. The title song was used as the TDK "Mini Disc" CM song.

== Covers ==
In 2012, the song was covered by Mr. Big singer Eric Martin on his cover album, Mr. Rock Vocalist. Fantôme Iris, a fictional visual kei band from multimedia franchise Argonavis from BanG Dream!, covered the song for the mini-album Gin no Yuri/Banzai Rizing!!!/Hikari no Akuma released on December 9, 2020. It was added to the video game as a playable song on February 9, 2021.
