= Glay Global Communication =

Japanese television series

GLAY Global Communication was an 11-episode, thirty-minute, television series aired on the Fuji Television Networks hosted by the Japanese rock band, Glay. The show ran from April 18, 2001 to June 27, 2001, every Wednesday at 1:55 am.

The series was focused on the production of the One Love album, the promotion of the Global Communication Asia special, the free street live in Sapporo, and the creation of the promotional videos for the singles from the One Love album. At the end of each episode each band member would give something away as a present for the fans.

== Episode Titles ==
- Episode 1: Good Morning, NYC - Members Create the PV -
- Episode 2: Good Morning, NYC - Members Create the PV -
- Episode 3: GLAY Press Conference

In this episode, the show's female street reporter takes us in the behind the scenes of the press conference announcing Glay's tour as well as interviews them on their way to another press meet

- Episode 4: GLAY Special Live in Sapporo

In this episode, we are taken behind the scenes of the special street live. We also view some of the performances from the concert.

- Episode 5: GLAY World Reports: Canada PV Making and Recording in New York

In this episode, we look behind the scenes of the filming of the GLOBAL COMMUNICATION PV and the recording of the album in New York City

- Episode 6: GLAY Expo 2001: Hisashi and Jiro GLOBAL COLLABORATION

In this episode the band is split, with Takuro and Teru in Asia and Hisashi and Jiro in Japan. Jiro meets with Gen to design a new bass and Hisashi visits a robot convention.

- Episode 7: Takuro and Teru in Asia vol. 1

In this episode we follow Kikuyano, our street reporter, with Glay in Asia. Hisashi and Jiro look at the footage with Akira from Japan and make comments at some of the weird things that happen their bandmates

- Episode 8: Takuro and Teru in Asia vol. 2

More stores Takuro and Teru in Asia in this episode with more commentary from Hisashi, Jiro, and Akira.

- Episode 9: GLAY Expo 2001: Takuro and Teru GLOBAL COLLABORATION

In this episode, Takuro meets up with a team to create a commercial for the expo and Teru meets up with CANDY STRIPPER to design the tour shirts.

- Episode 10: Asian Musician Talk Session vol. 1

In this episode Glay interviews the various big acts from the various Asian countries who will participate in their special Expo

- Episode 11: Asian Musician Talk Session vol. 2

In this episode we conclude the television series a final interview with the remaining special guests for their Kyushu Expo.

== Member Gifts ==
At the end of each episode, a present was given out by a band member to the fans.

1. Episode 1 - Jiro's bass pick from the set
2. Episode 2 - Takuro's Glasses from the Good Morning, NYC set
3. Episode 3 - Teru's postcards and tape
4. Episode 4 - Hisashi's weightless headphones
5. Episode 5 - Jiro's picture of the New York City skyline signed by him.
6. Episode 6 - Takuro's umbrella signed by him.
7. Episode 7 - Teru's staff passes for the events he went to in Asia signed by him.
8. Episode 8 - Hisashi's wireless keyboard.
9. Episode 9 - No gifts were given out
10. Episode 10 - No gifts were given out
11. Episode 11 - No gifts were given out

== Trivia ==
- The Good Morning NYC PV was filmed on and specifically for the show.
- At the beginning of each episode, the show's comical host, Akira, would play a game with the members to pick one so they could open up the show by saying the show's title. He would sometimes make them jump in front of the camera to yell it out or hold a roll of toilet paper (and other various silly things)
