= As Was =

EP by Manfred Mann with Paul Jones
- Released: 21 October 1966
- Recorded: 5 & 16 March 1965; 28 February & 11 March 1966
- Studio: EMI Studios, London
- Genre: British R&B, jazz-rock
- Language: English
- Label: His Master's Voice
- Producer: John Burgess

Manfred Mann with Paul Jones chronology
| As Is (1966) | As Was (1966) | Instrumental Assassination (1966) |

Manfred Mann EP chronology
| Instrumental Asylum (1966) | As Was (1966) | Instrumental Assassination (1966) |

As Was (also styled AsWas) is an EP by Manfred Mann (shown as Manfred Mann with Paul Jones), released in 1966. The EP is a 7-inch vinyl record and released in mono with the catalogue number His Master's Voice 7EG 8962.

At the time the EP was released, Paul Jones had already left the band and the new Manfred Mann line-up with Mike d'Abo, concurrently released their first album, As Is, on Fontana.

== Track listing ==
Side 1

1. "I Can't Believe What You Say" (Ike Turner)
2. "That's All I Ever Want From You Baby" (Ellie Greenwich, Jeff Barry)

Side 2

1. "Driva Man" (Max Roach, Oscar Brown Jr.)
2. "It's Getting Late" (Mann, Hugg, Jones, McGuinness)

== Personnel ==
- Manfred Mann – keyboards
- Mike Hugg – drums and vibes
- Paul Jones – vocals, harmonica, maracas
- Henry Lowther – trumpet and flute (all tracks except "I Can't Believe What You Say")
- Lyn Dobson – saxophone (all tracks except "I Can't Believe What You Say")
- Tom McGuinness – guitar (all tracks except "I Can't Believe What You Say"), bass guitar ("I Can't Believe What You Say")
- Jack Bruce – bass guitar (all tracks except "I Can't Believe What You Say")
- Mike Vickers – guitar (only on "I Can't Believe What You Say")

== Chart performance ==
This EP reached number 4 in the UK EPs Chart.
