= Soul of Mann =

Compilation album by Manfred Mann
- Released: 13 January 1967
- Recorded: 23 May 1963 – 24 January 1966
- Genres: R&B, pop, jazz
- Label: His Master's Voice
- Producer: John Burgess

Manfred Mann chronology
| Instrumental Assassination (1966) | Soul of Mann (1967) | Up the Junction (1968) |

Manfred Mann album chronology
| As Is (1966) | Soul of Mann (1967) | Up the Junction (1968) |

Soul of Mann is a 1967 compilation album of mostly instrumental recordings by Manfred Mann, released by His Master's Voice shortly after the company dropped the group from its roster. It was not well publicised and did not sell strongly.

The album brought together;

- Both sides of the group's debut single, "Why Should We Not" and "Brother Jack" (1963)
- "Sack O' Woe" (Cannonball Adderley) and "Mr.Anello", released on the group's first album The Five Faces of Manfred Mann (1964)
- "Bare Hugg", "The Abominable Snowmann" and "L.S.D.", from the group's second album Mann Made (1965)
- "Still I'm Sad" (Samwell-Smith), "My Generation" (Townshend), "(I Can't Get No) Satisfaction" (Jagger-Richards) and "I Got You Babe" (Bono) from the 1966 EP Instrumental Asylum, with Jack Bruce, Henry Lowther and Lyn Dobson
- "Spirit Feel" (Milt Jackson), previously released on the compilation Mann Made Hits, and two previously unreleased recordings, "God Rest Ye Merry Gentlemen" and "Tengo Tango".

CD releases contain extra tracks, mostly with vocals and from the group's series of His Master's Voice EPs.

== Track listing ==
1. "I Got You Babe" (Sonny Bono) – 2:31 - arranged by and bass played by Jack Bruce
2. "Bare Hugg" (Mike Hugg) – 3:50
3. "Spirit Feel" (Milt Jackson) – 2:42
4. "Why Should We Not" (take 5) (Manfred Mann) – 3:00
5. "L.S.D." (Tom McGuinness) – 3:48
6. "(I Can't Get No) Satisfaction" (Mick Jagger, Keith Richards) – 2:48 - arranged by and bass played by Jack Bruce
7. "God Rest Ye Merry Gentlemen" (Traditional) – 1:53
8. "My Generation" (Pete Townshend) – 2:27 - arranged by and bass played by Jack Bruce
9. "Mr. Anello" (version 2) (Mann, Hugg, Mike Vickers, Paul Jones, McGuinness) – 2:13
10. "Still I'm Sad" (Jim McCarty, Paul Samwell-Smith) – 2:42
11. "Tengo Tango" (Cannonball Adderley) – 3:34 - Bass - Jack Bruce
12. "Brother Jack" (Mann) – 2:26
13. "The Abominable Snowmann" (Vickers) – 2:44
14. "Sack O' Woe" (Adderley) – 2:07

CD bonus tracks

15. "Can't Believe It" (Jones) – 3:18
16. "Did You Have to Do That" (Jones) – 3:29
17. "Watermelon Man" (Herbie Hancock) – 3:14
18. "What Am I to Do" (Doc Pomus, Phil Spector) – 2:40
19. "Let's Go Get Stoned" (Nickolas Ashford, Valerie Simpson, Jo Armstead) – 3:51
20. "Tired of Trying Bored with Lying Scared of Dying" (Jones) – 2:41
21. "I Put a Spell on You" (Screamin' Jay Hawkins) – 3:36
22. "Machines" (Mort Shuman) – 2:27
23. "She Needs Company" (version 1) (Jones) – 2:49
24. "Tennessee Waltz" (Pee Wee King, Redd Stewart)– 3:03
25. "When Will I Be Loved" (Phil Everly) – 2:00 - arranged by and bass played by Jack Bruce
26. "That's All I Ever Want from You Baby" (Ellie Greenwich, Jeff Barry) – 2:33
