= Just Like a Woman =

1966 single by Bob Dylan

- West German picture sleeve

Single by Bob Dylan

from the album Blonde on Blonde
- B-side: "Obviously 5 Believers"
- Released: August 18, 1966
- Recorded: March 8, 1966
- Studio: Columbia, Nashville
- Genre: Country rock; folk rock
- Length: 4:53 (album); 2:56 (single)
- Label: Columbia
- Songwriter: Bob Dylan
- Producer: Bob Johnston

Bob Dylan singles chronology
"I Want You" (1966)	"Just Like a Woman" (1966)	"Leopard-Skin Pill-Box Hat" (1967)

Audio
- "Just Like a Woman" on YouTube

"Just Like a Woman" is a song by the American singer-songwriter Bob Dylan from his seventh studio album, Blonde on Blonde (1966). The song was written by Dylan and produced by Bob Johnston. Dylan allegedly wrote it on Thanksgiving Day in 1965, though some biographers doubt this, concluding that he most likely improvised the lyrics in the studio. Dylan recorded the song at Columbia Studio A in Nashville, Tennessee in March 1966. The song has been criticized by some for sexism or misogyny in its lyrics, and has received a mixed critical reaction, while others have countered these claims by pointing out that the lyrics are addressing issues of maturity rather than gender. Some critics have suggested that the song was inspired by Edie Sedgwick, while others consider that it refers to Dylan's relationship with fellow folk singer Joan Baez. Retrospectively, the song has received renewed praise, and in 2011, Rolling Stone magazine ranked Dylan's version at number 232 in their list of the 500 Greatest Songs of All Time. A shorter edit was released as a single in the United States during August 1966 and peaked at number 33 on the Billboard Hot 100. The single also reached 8th place in the Australian charts, 12th place on the Belgium Ultratop Wallonia listing, 30th in the Dutch Top 40, and 38th on the RPM listing in Canada.

Though a relative success in the United States, Dylan's recording of "Just Like a Woman" was not issued as a single in the United Kingdom. However, British beat group Manfred Mann recorded a version of the song in June 1966 for their album As Is, during their first recording session together with producer Shel Talmy. In July, it became Manfred Mann's first single to be released through Fontana Records. It was a hit in several European countries, reaching number 10 in the UK Singles Chart and number 1 in Sweden. The song received positive reviews from critics, several of whom highlighted Mike d'Abo's vocal performance.

== Background and recording ==
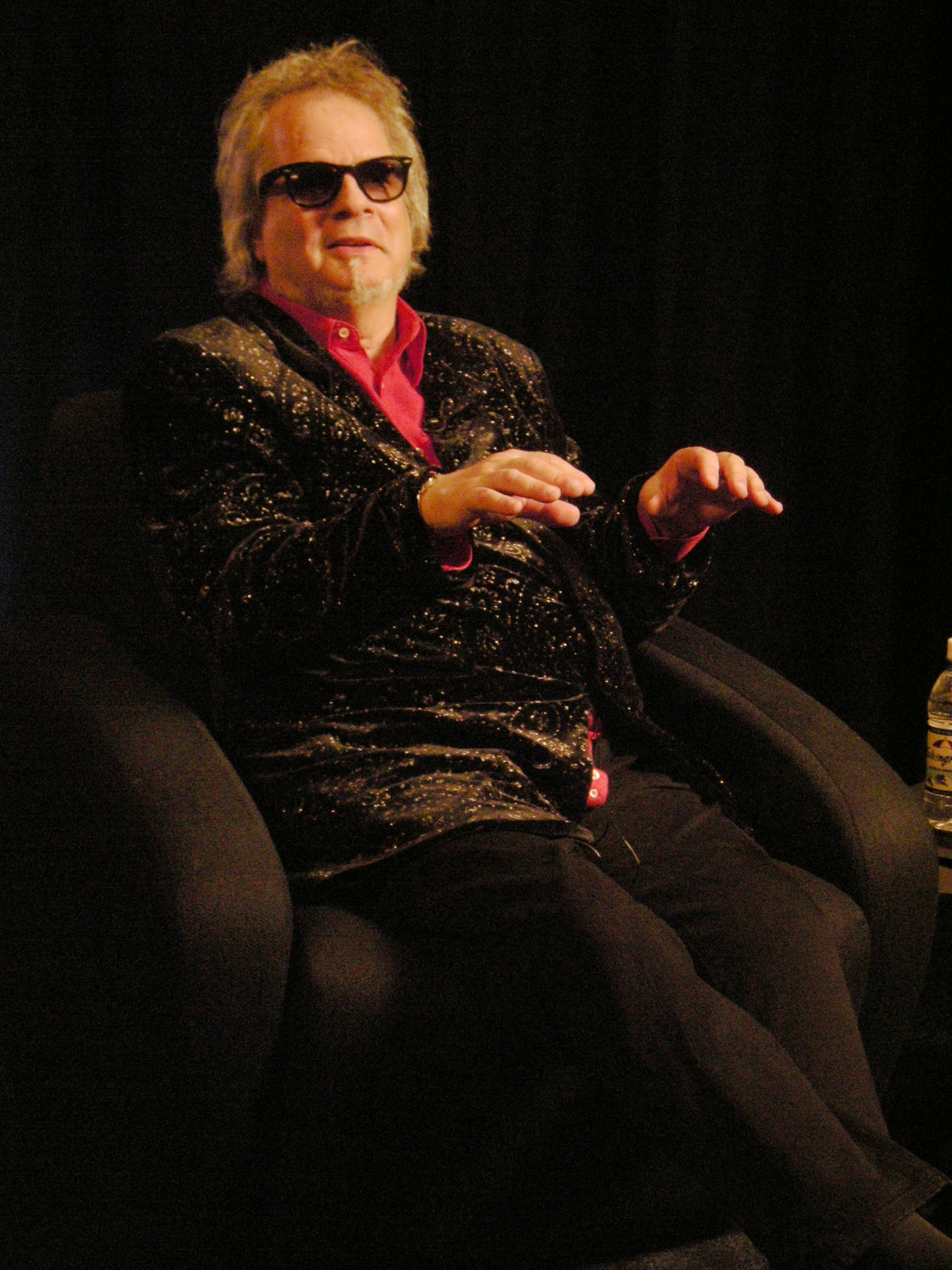
Al Kooper (pictured in 2009) traveled with Dylan to Nashville, and played organ on "Just Like a Woman".

Bob Dylan released his fifth studio album Bringing It All Back Home in March 1965, followed by Highway 61 Revisited in August of that year. In October, he began recording sessions for this next album Blonde on Blonde. After several sessions in New York, the recording was relocated to Nashville following a suggestion by Dylan's producer Bob Johnston. Two musicians from the New York sessions were retained; Dylan was accompanied by Al Kooper on his journey to Nashville and Robbie Robertson joined them there.

The master take of "Just Like a Woman" was produced by Johnston and recorded at Columbia Studio A, Nashville, Tennessee on March 8, 1966. Seven complete takes, and multiple rehearsals and partial takes were recorded. Take 18, the last of the session, was used on the album, which was released on June 20, 1966.

The song features a lilting melody, backed by delicately picked nylon-string guitar and piano instrumentation, resulting in what Bill Janovitz wrote was arguably the most "radio-friendly" track on the album. The musicians backing Dylan on the track are Charlie McCoy, Joe South, and Wayne Moss on guitar, Henry Strzelecki on bass guitar, Hargus "Pig" Robbins on piano, Kooper on organ, and Kenneth Buttrey on drums. Although Dylan's regular guitar sideman Robertson was present at the recording session, he did not play on the song.

The album version is 4 minutes and 53 seconds long. (Note: Some sources vary slightly on the timing, e.g. the Searching for a Gem site gives 4:54) A single version, edited down to 2 minutes and 56 seconds, was released in the United States on August 18, 1966, and in other countries, not including the United Kingdom, in the same year. Musicologist Larry Starr noted that Dylan employed a traditional AABA structure in the song, and that, unusually for him, the bridge literally bridges over into the next section of the song: "Ain't it clear that –[new section] I just can't fit."

== Composition and lyrical interpretation ==
In the album notes of his 1985 compilation Biograph, Dylan related that he wrote the lyrics of "Just Like a Woman" in Kansas City on Thanksgiving Day, November 25, 1965, while on tour. However, after listening to the recording session tapes of Dylan at work on the song in the Nashville studio, historian Sean Wilentz has written that he improvised the lyrics in the studio by singing "disconnected lines and semi-gibberish". Dylan was initially unsure what the person described in the song does that is just like a woman, rejecting "shakes", "wakes", and "makes mistakes". The improvisational spirit extends to the band attempting, in their fourth take, a "weird, double-time version", somewhere between Jamaican ska and Bo Diddley.

Clinton Heylin has analyzed successive drafts of the song from the so-called Blonde On Blonde papers, documents that Heylin believes were either left behind by Dylan or stolen from his Nashville hotel room. The first draft has a complete first verse, a single couplet from the second verse, and another couplet from the third verse. There is no trace of the chorus of the song. In successive drafts, Dylan added sporadic lines to these verses, without ever writing out the chorus. This leads Heylin to speculate that Dylan was writing the words while Kooper played the tune over and over on the piano in the hotel room, and the chorus was a "last-minute formulation in the studio". Kooper has explained that he would play piano for Dylan in his hotel room, to aid the song-writing process, and then would teach the tunes to the studio musicians at the recording sessions.

Dylan's exploration of female wiles and feminine vulnerability was widely rumored—"not least by her acquaintances among Andy Warhol's Factory retinue"—to be about Edie Sedgwick. The reference to Baby's penchant for "fog, amphetamine and pearls" suggests Sedgwick or someone similar, according to Heylin. "Just Like a Woman" has also been rumored to have been written about Dylan's relationship with fellow folk singer Joan Baez. In particular, it has been suggested that the lines "Please don't let on that you knew me when/I was hungry and it was your world" may refer to the early days of their relationship, when Baez was more famous than Dylan. Ralph J. Gleason of the San Francisco Examiner considered that the song was "achingly autobiographical".

The subject of the song is said by the narrator to have lost "ribbons and bows" from her hair. Timothy Hampton suggested that this references songs such as "Buttons and Bows" and "Scarlet Ribbons (For Her Hair)" that use the image as one of femininity, although "these traces of an earlier age of innocent song and wholesome girlhood are modernized when they are juxtaposed with the 'hip' images of amphetamines and 'fog'" in "Just Like a Woman".

=== Alleged sexism ===
The song has been criticized for sexism or misogyny in its lyrics. Alan Rinzler, in his book Bob Dylan: The Illustrated Record, describes the song as "a devastating character assassination...the most sardonic, nastiest of all Dylan's putdowns of former lovers". In 1971, Marion Meade wrote in The New York Times that "there's no more complete catalogue of sexist slurs", and went on to note that in the song Dylan "defines women's natural traits as greed, hypocrisy, whining and hysteria". Dylan biographer Robert Shelton noted that "the title is a male platitude that justifiably angers women," although Shelton believed that "Dylan is ironically toying with that platitude".

Countering allegations of misogyny, music critic Paul Williams, in his book Bob Dylan: Performing Artist, Book One 1960–1973, pointed out that Dylan sings in an affectionate tone from beginning to end. He further comments on Dylan's singing by saying that "there's never a moment in the song, despite the little digs and the confessions of pain, when you can't hear the love in his voice". Williams also contends that a central theme of the song is the power that the woman described in the lyrics has over Dylan, as evidenced by the line "I was hungry and it was your world".

Janovitz, in his AllMusic review, noted that in the context of the song, Dylan "seems on the defensive... as if he has been accused of causing the woman's breakdown. But he takes some of the blame as well". Janovitz concluded by noting, "It is certainly not misogynist to look at a personal relationship from the point of view of one of those involved, be it man or woman. There is nothing in the text to suggest that Dylan has a disrespect for, much less an irrational hatred of, women in general." Similarly, literary critic Christopher Ricks asks, "could there ever be any challenging art about men and women where the accusation just didn't arise?" Moreover, Gill has argued that the key "delimitation" in the song is not between man and woman, but between woman and girl, so the issue is one "of maturity rather than gender".

== Critical reception ==
David F. Wagner, in The Post-Crescent, found "Just Like a Woman" to be a "tender, melodic ballad with punch", that he felt would be the most-covered track from the album. The critic for the Runcorn Weekly News preferred Dylan's original to the cover by Manfred Mann, and wrote that "it has more meaning when Dylan sings it". The Asbury Park Press columnist Don Lass described the song as "an evocative, lyrical, almost painful love song". A Billboard reviewer considered Dylan in "top-form with this much recorded bluesy ballad". A staff writer for Cash Box described the song as "a slow-shufflin' laconic ode which underscores just how much men need woman [sic]". The staff writer for Record World believed that Dylan went after a more relaxed "musical background than usual on this ditty", calling the lyrics "perceptive".

The Sun-Herald's reviewer dismissed what they referred to as the "pop songs" on Blonde on Blonde, including "Just Like a Woman": "the fancy words are inclined to hide the fact that there is nothing there at all". Craig McGregor of The Sydney Morning Herald found the song "overly sentimental". "The Arizona Republic reviewer Troy Irvine described the single release version as "a bright mover with good folk appeal".

Retrospectively, critic Michael Gray likewise called the song "uncomfortably sentimental. The chorus is trite and coy and the verses aren't strong enough to compensate." Gray highlights the lines "...she aches just like a woman/But she breaks just like a little girl", commenting that "What parades as reflective wisdom... is really maudlin platitude". He did, however, praise the middle eight due to Dylan's delivery of the words. In 2011, Rolling Stone magazine ranked Dylan's version of the song at number 232 in their list of the 500 Greatest Songs of All Time. In 2013, Jim Beviglia rated it as the 17th-best of Dylan's songs, and praised the instrumental performances as "just about perfect [for] a studio recording".

== Live versions and later releases ==
According to his official website, Dylan played the song live in concert 871 times from 1966 to 2010. In his 1966 tour performances, Dylan chose to play the song solo rather than with the band that accompanied him on the tour. Starr commented that although the original album version is "notable for its understated accompaniment to Dylan's subtle and expressive vocals", in his performance at Manchester on May 17, 1966, Dylan "seem[ed] intent, if anything, to exceed the sense of intimacy he had achieved in the studio".

In addition to its appearance on Blonde on Blonde, "Just Like a Woman" also appears on several Dylan compilations, including Bob Dylan's Greatest Hits (1967), Masterpieces (1978), Biograph (1985), The Best of Bob Dylan, Vol. 1 (1997), The Essential Bob Dylan (2000), and Dylan (2007). The "Just Like a Woman" recording session was released in its entirety on the 18-disc Collector's Edition of The Bootleg Series Vol. 12: The Cutting Edge 1965–1966 in 2015, with highlights from the outtakes appearing on the 6-disc and 2-disc versions of the album.

Live recordings of the song have been included on Before the Flood (1974), Bob Dylan at Budokan (1979), The Bootleg Series Vol. 4: Bob Dylan Live 1966, The "Royal Albert Hall" Concert (1998), The Bootleg Series Vol. 5: Bob Dylan Live 1975, The Rolling Thunder Revue (2002). In June 2019, five live performances of the song from the 1975 Rolling Thunder Revue tour were released in the box set The Rolling Thunder Revue: The 1975 Live Recordings. Dylan performed the song at George Harrison and Ravi Shankar's The Concert for Bangladesh in 1971, and his performance is featured on the Concert for Bangladesh album.

== Credits and personnel ==
The details of the personnel involved in making Blonde on Blonde are subject to some uncertainty. The credits below are adapted from the Bob Dylan All the Songs: The Story Behind Every Track book.

Musicians

- Bob Dylan – vocals, guitar, harmonica
- Charlie McCoy – guitar
- Joe South – guitar
- Wayne Moss – guitar
- Al Kooper – organ
- Hargus "Pig" Robbins – piano
- Henry Strzelecki – bass guitar
- Kenneth Buttrey – drums

Technical

- Bob Johnston – record producer

== Manfred Mann version ==
"Just Like a Woman"
- Dutch picture sleeve

Single by Manfred Mann

from the album As Is
- B-side: "I Wanna Be Rich"
- Released: July 29, 1966
- Recorded: June 30, 1966
- Studio: Philips, Marble Arch, London
- Length: 2:46
- Label: Fontana
- Songwriter: Bob Dylan
- Producer: Shel Talmy

Manfred Mann singles chronology
"You Gave Me Somebody to Love" (1966)	"Just Like a Woman" (1966)	"Semi-Detached, Suburban Mr. James" (1966)

Audio
- "Just Like a Woman" on YouTube

=== Background and recording ===
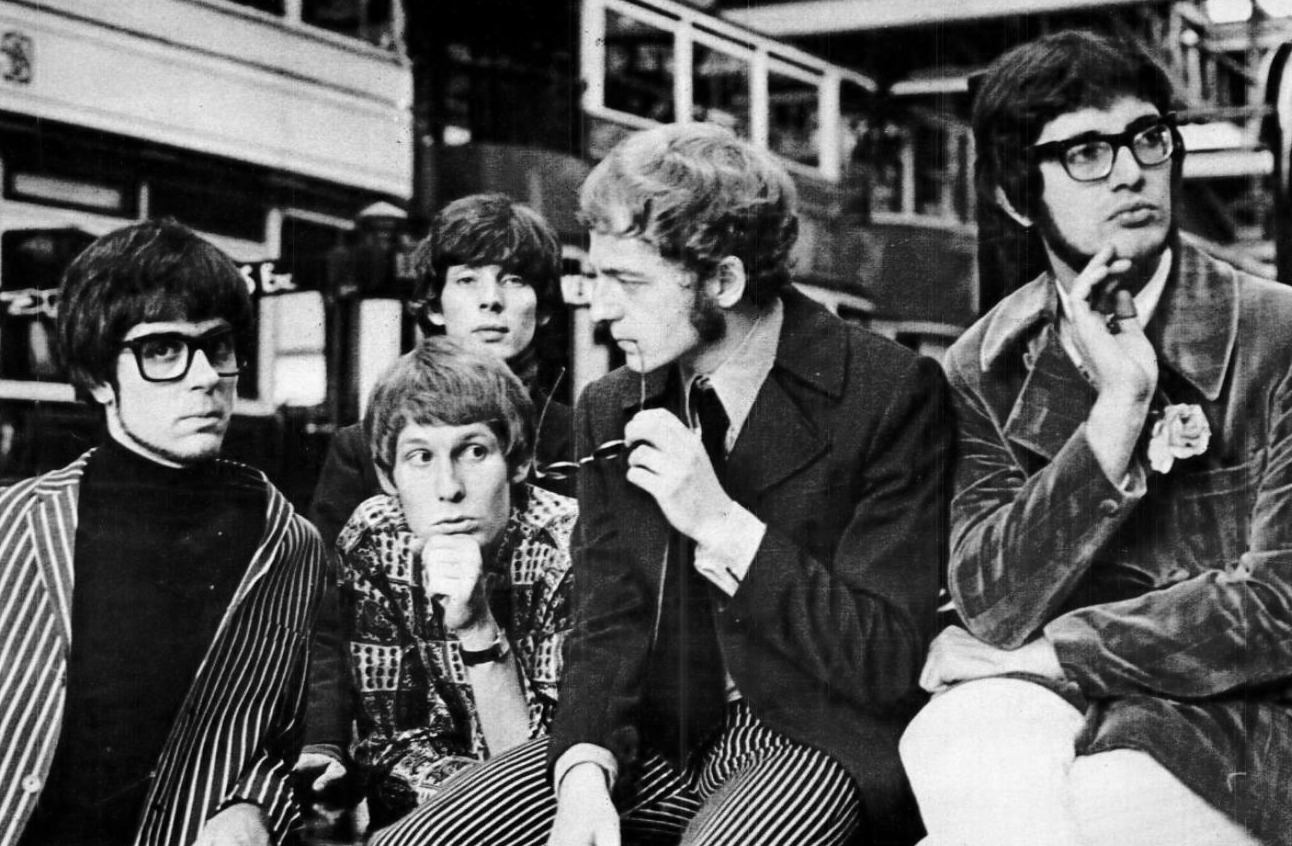
The group Manfred Mann in an advertisement for the single "Just Like A Woman". From left to right, Manfred Mann, Mike d'Abo, Klaus Voormann, Mike Hugg, and Tom McGuinness are shown.

English beat group Manfred Mann formed in December 1962 (originally as the Mann-Hugg Blues Brothers), and signed to record label His Master's Voice in May 1964. By mid-1966, the group had started to break up. They enjoyed the success of their single "Pretty Flamingo", which had become their second song to reach number-one on the Record Retailer chart. However, internally, Manfred Mann had begun splitting. Vocalist Paul Jones gave the group a year's notice that he would be leaving to pursue a solo career. After a car accident in early 1966, which left Jones unable to perform, Manfred Mann hired bassist Jack Bruce along with brass players and cut some instrumental songs. However, during the success of "Pretty Flamingo", Jones convinced the record label about recording solo in May of that year, when the group's three-year contract expired. His Master's Voice decided to sign Jones as a solo artist in June 1966, leaving the other members without a record label or contract.

Bruce had by this point also left to form Cream with Eric Clapton and Ginger Baker, also leaving Manfred Mann without a bassist. The solution came when they hired bassist Klaus Voormann, and singer Mike d'Abo after seeing him perform on the show There's a Whole Scene Going. d'Abo, who had recently quit his band, accepted the offer to join. In June 1966, the group signed a contract with Fontana Records and on June 8, recorded their first two tracks with Voormann and d'Abo, "I Wanna Be Rich" and "Let It Be Me". This collaboration proved fruitful, with them staying on the label for the rest of their career.

Producer Shel Talmy had previously helped Manfred Mann secure an audition for Decca Records in 1963, though that ultimately went nowhere. Talmy, who had produced for such artists as the Kinks, the Who, and David Bowie, was aware that the members were fans of Dylan's music. The group had scored a hit with another Dylan composition, "If You Gotta Go, Go Now" the previous year, and Talmy suggested that they record another Dylan song. Additionally, Manfred Mann's previous manager Kenneth Pitt was Dylan's British publicist, giving them access to demos and otherwise unavailable material. The song features the signature steel guitar playing by Tom McGuinness, though notably lacks any significant keyboard parts unlike much of their earlier material. The group recorded it on June 30, 1966, at Philips Studio in London with Talmy producing.

=== Release and reception ===
Fontana Records released "Just Like A Woman" as Manfred Mann's debut single on their label on July 29, 1966. Coincidentally, a version by Jonathan King was released on the same day by Decca Records, which led to a feud in the charts over whose version would be more successful. Another coincidence is the fact that both these versions were released on the same day Dylan crashed his motorcycle, effectively putting him out of the spotlight for well over a year. Manfred Mann's version was backed by "I Wanna Be Rich", which was written by the group's drummer Mike Hugg. Though Hugg thought that it was most likely a safe choice for their debut single with d'Abo, the band's eponym and keyboard player Manfred Mann disagreed, stating that the release of the single was "the most stressful moment in my whole musical career", and recounted that he was depressed when it initially did not receive any radio play. The song was included on the band's album As Is, released in October 1966.

The song entered the Record Retailer chart on August 10, at a position of 37. It peaked at number 10 for the week of September 21, before exiting the chart on October 12, at a position of 38. The song spent 10 weeks on the Record Retailer chart. King's version however, only reached number 56, which, according to Bruce Eder of AllMusic, meant that Manfreds chart success "establish[ed] the new lineup's commercial credibility". It reached number nine in Disc and Music Echo, number 12 in Melody Maker and eight in the New Musical Express chart. It was also a number one in Sweden and a top ten hit in both Denmark and Finland. In the US however, it barely dented the charts, only reaching number 101 on the Billboard Bubbling Under Hot 100 chart.

The track was well received by critics upon release. In Disc and Music Echo, Penny Valentine reviewed both Manfred Mann's and King's versions, but preferred the former, calling it more "subtle" and "far more pretty". She attributed this to d'Abo's "breathing away sexily", though she believed the song would do better in the charts if Jones had been the lead vocalist. Norman Jopling and Peter Jones of Record Mirror felt that the song would be a big hit, stating that d'Abo's vocals "work perfectly" within the frame of the song, while comparing the group backing to Dylan's work. They concluded by stating that it was a "fine-tempoed arrangement". In Billboard magazine, the reviewer called the track a "strong debut" and predicted to reach the Billboard Hot 100. A Cash Box staff writer described it as a "harsh, funk-filled reading", which the reviewer thought would generate sales for the single.

== Charts ==
Bob Dylan version
Chart (1966)	Peak position
Australia (Kent Music Report)	8
Belgium (Ultratop 50 Wallonia)	12
Canada (RPM Top Singles)	38
Netherlands (Dutch Top 40)	30
US Billboard Hot 100	33
US Top 100 (Cashbox)	28
US (Record World 100 Top Pops)	26

Manfred Mann version
Chart (1966)	Peak position
Australia (Go-Set)	12
Australia (Kent Music Report)	24
Denmark (Danmarks Radio)	6
Finland (Soumen Virallinen)	7
New Zealand (Listener)	3
Rhodesia (Lyons Maid)	9
South Africa (Springbok Radio)	5
Sweden (Kvällstoppen)	1
Sweden (Tio i Topp)	1
UK (Disc and Music Echo)	9
UK (Melody Maker)	12
UK (New Musical Express)	8
UK (Record Retailer)	10
US Bubbling Under Hot 100 (Billboard)	101
US Top 100 (Cash Box)	94
US (Record World 100 Top Pops)	67
