= As Is (album) =

Studio album by Manfred Mann
- Released: 21 October 1966
- Recorded: 30 June – 22 August 1966
- Studio: Philips (London)
- Genres: Rhythm and blues; psychedelic pop
- Length: 31:36
- Label: Fontana
- Producer: Shel Talmy

Manfred Mann chronology
Instrumental Asylum (1966)	As Is (1966)	As Was (1966)

Manfred Mann album chronology
Mann Made Hits (1966)	As Is (1966)	Soul of Mann (1967)

Alternative cover
- 2004 reissue cover

Singles from As Is
- 1. "Just Like a Woman" Released: July 29, 1966

Professional ratings
Review scores
Source	Rating
AllMusic	2.5/5 stars

As Is is the third British studio album by Manfred Mann, released in the United Kingdom on 21 October 1966 through Fontana Records. It was their fourth overall (including a "greatest hits" package) but their first to feature new members Mike d'Abo and Klaus Voormann.

== Overview ==
The twelve tracks on the record include the line-up's first single release, a cut-down version of Bob Dylan's "Just Like a Woman" that reached the UK top ten, and a short cool jazz version of "Autumn Leaves", reminiscent of the Modern Jazz Quartet with Mike Hugg's vibraphone and double bass from the group's former bassist Dave Richmond, sounding like an out-take from the group's instrumental releases: these two make weight for a fairly short collection of group compositions. As d'Abo's presence somehow sparked Mike Hugg into producing baroque pop miniatures, both contribute three songs: d'Abo's "Box Office Draw" and "Trouble and Tea" are well-crafted pop, while "As Long as I Have Lovin' " is a generic soul ballad. Hugg's "Morning After the Party", also released as a "B" side and on the compilation album What a Mann, recalls the rowdy rhythm and blues of the group's past, while two of his three collaborations with Mann suggest something of the direction they would later take with Manfred Mann Chapter Three. Guitarist Tom McGuinness provides a range of textures, including his trademark National Steel Guitar and contributes sleeve notes and a gentle folk-ballad. The group continued to exploit studio multitracking: keyboardist Mann layering Mellotrons, bassist Voormann taking over from Mike Vickers on flutes.

== Recording sessions ==
All of the songs were recorded 30 June – 22 August 1966, at Philips Studio, London, England, together with producer Shel Talmy:

- "Trouble and Tea", "Just Like a Woman" – 30 June 1966
- "Box Office Draw", "Dealer, Dealer", "Superstititous Guy" – 20 July 1966
- "Box Office Draw" – 12 August 1966
- "A Now and Then Thing", "Each Other's Company", "Morning After the Party", "Another Kind of Music", "As Long as I Have Lovin' ", "Autumn Leaves", "You're My Girl" – 22 August 1966

== Track listing ==
Side one
No.	Title	Writer(s)	Length
1.	"Trouble and Tea"	Mike d'Abo	2:12
2.	"A Now and Then Thing"	Tom McGuinness	2:44
3.	"Each Other's Company"	Mike Hugg	2:56
4.	"Box Office Draw"	d'Abo	2:13
5.	"Dealer, Dealer"	Hugg, Manfred Mann, Peter Thomas	3:17
6.	"Morning After the Party"	Hugg	2:34

Side two
No.	Title	Writer(s)	Length
7.	"Another Kind of Music"	Hugg, Mann	2:32
8.	"As Long as I Have Lovin' "	d'Abo	2:44
9.	"Autumn Leaves"	Joseph Kosma, Johnny Mercer	1:56
10.	"Superstitious Guy"	Hugg	2:46
11.	"You're My Girl"	Hugg, Mann, Thomas	2:48
12.	"Just Like a Woman"	Bob Dylan	2:54

== Personnel ==
=== Musicians ===
- Manfred Mann – keyboards
- Mike d'Abo – vocals; piano on "As Long As I Have Been Lovin' "
- Tom McGuinness – guitar
- Klaus Voormann – bass guitar, recorder, flute; guitar on "Another Kind of Music"
- Dave Richmond – double bass on "Autumn Leaves"
- Mike Hugg – drums, vibraphone

=== Technical ===
- Shel Talmy – producer
- Klaus Voormann – cover design
- Tom McGuinness – liner notes
