= Instrumental Asylum =

EP by Manfred Mann
- Released: 3 June 1966
- Recorded: 12 & 24 January 1966
- Genres: British R&B, jazz-rock
- Language: English
- Label: His Master's Voice
- Producer: John Burgess

Manfred Mann chronology
Machines (1966)	Instrumental Asylum (1966)	Mann Made Hits (1966)

Manfred Mann EP chronology
Machines (1966)	Instrumental Asylum (1966)	As Was (1966)

Instrumental Asylum is an EP by Manfred Mann, released in 1966. The EP is a 7-inch vinyl record and released in mono with the catalogue number His Master's Voice 7EG 8949.

== Background ==
The band recorded this as they were in the process of re-organizing. All the songs chosen were covers of current relatively well known pop and rock songs, The Yardbirds' "Still I'm Sad" being the most obscure. Mike Vickers had left and been replaced on guitar by bassist Tom McGuinness, who in turn was replaced on bass by Jack Bruce. Horn players Henry Lowther and Lyn Dobson took over the lead spot from singer Paul Jones, who was soon to quit the band. There is little evidence of Jones on the record. As with most of their other records, both albums and EPs of this era, the liner notes were written by Manfred Mann member Tom McGuinness.

== Track listing ==
Side 1

1. "Still I'm Sad" (Paul Samwell-Smith)
2. "My Generation" (Pete Townshend)

Side 2

1. "(I Can't Get No) Satisfaction" (Mick Jagger, Keith Richards)
2. "I Got You Babe" (Sonny Bono)

== Personnel ==
- Manfred Mann – keyboards
- Henry Lowther – trumpet and flute
- Lyn Dobson – saxophone
- Paul Jones – harmonica
- Tom McGuinness – guitar
- Jack Bruce – bass guitar
- Mike Hugg – drums and vibes

== Chart performance ==
This EP was the band's least successful effort since their initial EP release, Cock-a-Hoop in 1964. It reached # 3 in the British EP charts.

== See also ==
- Instrumental Assassination
- Soul of Mann
