= A Band of Angels =

Mid-1960s English pop group

- Origin: Harrow, England
- Genres: Pop
- Years active: 1964–1966
- Labels: Piccadilly Records, United Artists
- Spinoff of: Timebox, Manfred Mann
- Past members: Mike d'Abo; John Edward Baker; John Christian Gaydon; Andrew Charles Malcolm Glyn Petre; David Robert Wilkinson

A Band of Angels were a mid-1960s English pop group, featuring Mike d'Abo (vocals, various instruments), John Edward Baker (lead guitar), John Christian Gaydon (vocals, rhythm guitar), Andrew Charles Malcolm Glyn Petre (drums), and David Robert Wilkinson (bass guitar). The band formed at Harrow School in 1964, and were signed by United Artists Records the same year. They later moved across to Piccadilly Records and their final single release, "Invitation" became a Northern soul favourite in the 1970s.

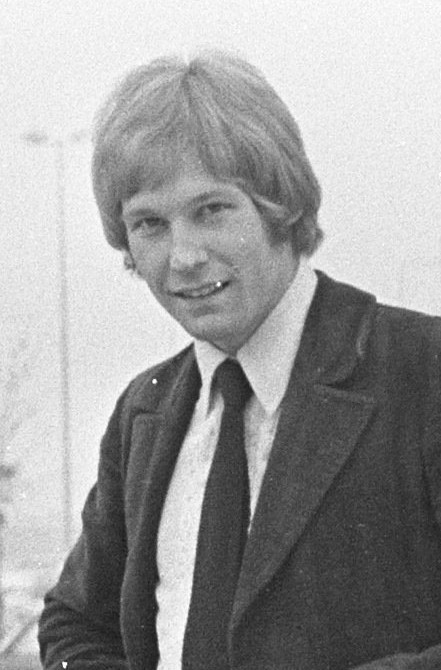
A Band of Angels frontman Mike d'Abo in 1967

A Band of Angels disbanded in July 1966, when d'Abo left to front Manfred Mann, replacing Paul Jones who had left to go solo.

John Gaydon became a manager, involved with King Crimson, Julie Felix, Emerson, Lake & Palmer, T. Rex and Roxy Music in partnership with A Band of Angels former road manager David Enthoven. They later co-founded E.G. Records.

Andrew Petre joined a group called Timebox in the period September 1966 until August 1967. John Gaydon (born 1942) died in May 2016, aged 74.

== Discography ==
- 1964: Soundtrack album – Just For You (Decca LK 4620) (One song: "Hide 'n' Seek" (Baker/d'Abo))
- 1964: "Me" (Baker/d'Abo) / "Not True As Yet" (Baker/d'Abo) (United Artists UP 1049)
- 1964: "She'll Never Be You" (Sedaka/Greenfield) / "Gonna Make A Woman of You" (d'Abo/Baker) (United Artists UP 1066)
- 1965: "Leave It To Me" (Pomus/Shuman) / "Too Late My Love" (d'Abo) (Piccadilly 7N 35279)
- 1966: "Invitation" (d'Abo) / "Cheat And Lie" (Miki Dallon) (Piccadilly 7N 35292)
