= Instrumental Assassination =

EP by Manfred Mann
- Released: 2 December 1966
- Recorded: October 1966
- Studio: Philips (London)
- Genre: RnB, jazz, pop
- Language: English
- Label: Fontana Records
- Producer: Shel Talmy

Manfred Mann chronology
As Was (1966)	Instrumental Assassination (1966)	Soul of Mann (1967)

Manfred Mann EP chronology
As Was (1966)	Instrumental Assassination (1966)

Instrumental Assassination is a 1966 jazz-rock EP by Manfred Mann, produced by Shel Talmy and released by Fontana Records (TE17483). Mann reported that the group "loved it" and the producer was "particularly pleased": Fontana's Jack Baverstock found it full of ideas, humour and new thinking, but the EP sold poorly and was re-released in its entirety on the 1968 Fontana compilation album What A Mann.

== Background ==
Like the earlier Instrumental Asylum the record offered four free-wheeling and light-hearted improvisatory arrangements of current pop songs, The Troggs' "Wild Thing" and "With a Girl like You" and Georgie Fame's "Sunny" and "Getaway". Manfred Mann and Mike Hugg continued their practice, established at their earliest sessions, of dubbing jazzy solos, on Hammond organ and vibraphone respectively, over their own rhythm section tracks, with Mann on piano and Hugg on drums, in this case with their former double bassist Dave Richmond. Their current electric bass player, Klaus Voormann appeared on only recorder. Tom McGuinness played guitar.

"Sunny" begins with bowed bass and lazy vibes introducing a powerful organ solo, accompanied by frenzied screaming (it was, said Mann "a pretty wild session"), dissolving into a fast cadenza and recapitulation. "Wild Thing" sets a piano-driven soul riff over which the melody features tone-bending tricks on Mann's Mellotron brass. "Getaway" has the song's short theme on bowed bass, filled out by vibraphone and organ, leading to an organ and then a bowed bass solo with uncredited scat unison vocal. "With a Girl like You" has a solo guitar, a military waltzing snare and more spontaneous vocals.

== Track listing ==
Side 1

1. "Sunny" (Bobby Hebb)
2. "Wild Thing" (Chip Taylor)

Side 2

1. "Getaway" (Clive Powell)
2. "With a Girl Like You" (Reg Presley)

== Personnel ==
- Manfred Mann - piano, Hammond organ, Mellotron
- Tom McGuinness - guitar
- Mike Hugg - drums and vibraphone
- Dave Richmond - double bass
- Klaus Voormann - recorder
