= Dave Richmond =

Musical artist (born 1938)

- Born: David Henry Richmond; 1938 (age 87–88)
- Origin: Brighton, Sussex, England
- Instruments: Bass guitar, double bass
- Website: www.daverichmond.co.uk

David Henry Richmond (born 29 March 1938 in Brighton, Sussex, England) is a British professional bass player, best known as a founder member of the 1960s pop group Manfred Mann. During his short tenure with the group, he played bass on their first hit record, "5-4-3-2-1".

== Career ==
Richmond first picked up the ukulele at the age of 14. He later picked up the bass after hearing "Big Noise From Winnetka" on a record player owned by his older brother.

Richmond joined the group Manfred Mann in 1963, after being recruited by Manfred Mann and Mike Hugg. Richmond left the band in 1964, shortly after he recorded bass for their first hit single "5-4-3-2-1", the theme song for the ITV music show Ready, Steady, Go!. He was replaced by Tom McGuinness. Richmond was then recruited as the new bass player of the John Barry Seven, following the departure of Ray Styles in 1964. After Manfred Mann's bass player McGuinness switched to lead guitar, Richmond played double bass on the 1966 Manfred Mann EP Instrumental Assassination.

Richmond later became a session player, playing bass guitar on the 1969 version of "Je t'aime... moi non plus" by its composer Serge Gainsbourg and Gainsbourg's then-girlfriend Jane Birkin. The song became a number one hit on the UK singles chart in 1969—the first foreign-language song to top the charts there—and also reached number one in Austria, Norway, Sweden and Switzerland that year. He later played bass on Gainsbourg's 1971 album Histoire de Melody Nelson.

Richmond also worked with Elton John, Marvin, Welch & Farrar, Olivia Newton-John, Dusty Springfield, Cilla Black and the Shadows, amongst others. In the 1970s he was a member of Steve Gray's library music ensemble WASP, which recorded much music for the KPM 1000 Series. Richmond played the fretless bass guitar on the theme song to Last of the Summer Wine. In his later years, he re-entered the world of jazz and big band music, performing with the Bert Kaempfert Orchestra and the String of Pearls Orchestra.

== Discography ==
=== With Manfred Mann ===
==== Singles ====
Title	Year
"Why Should We Not" b/w "Brother Jack"	1963
"Cock-a-Hoop" b/w "Now You're Needing Me"	1963
"5-4-3-2-1" b/w "Without You"	1964

=== Other notable recordings ===
- "Je t'aime... moi non plus" – Serge Gainsbourg and Jane Birkin (1969)
- "The Old Man's Back Again (Dedicated to the Neo-Stalinist Regime)" – Scott Walker (1969)
- "Your Song" and "Border Song" – Elton John (1970)
- "It Must Be Love" – Labi Sifre (1971)
- "If Not For You" – Olivia Newton-John (1971)
