= The Blues Band =

British blues band

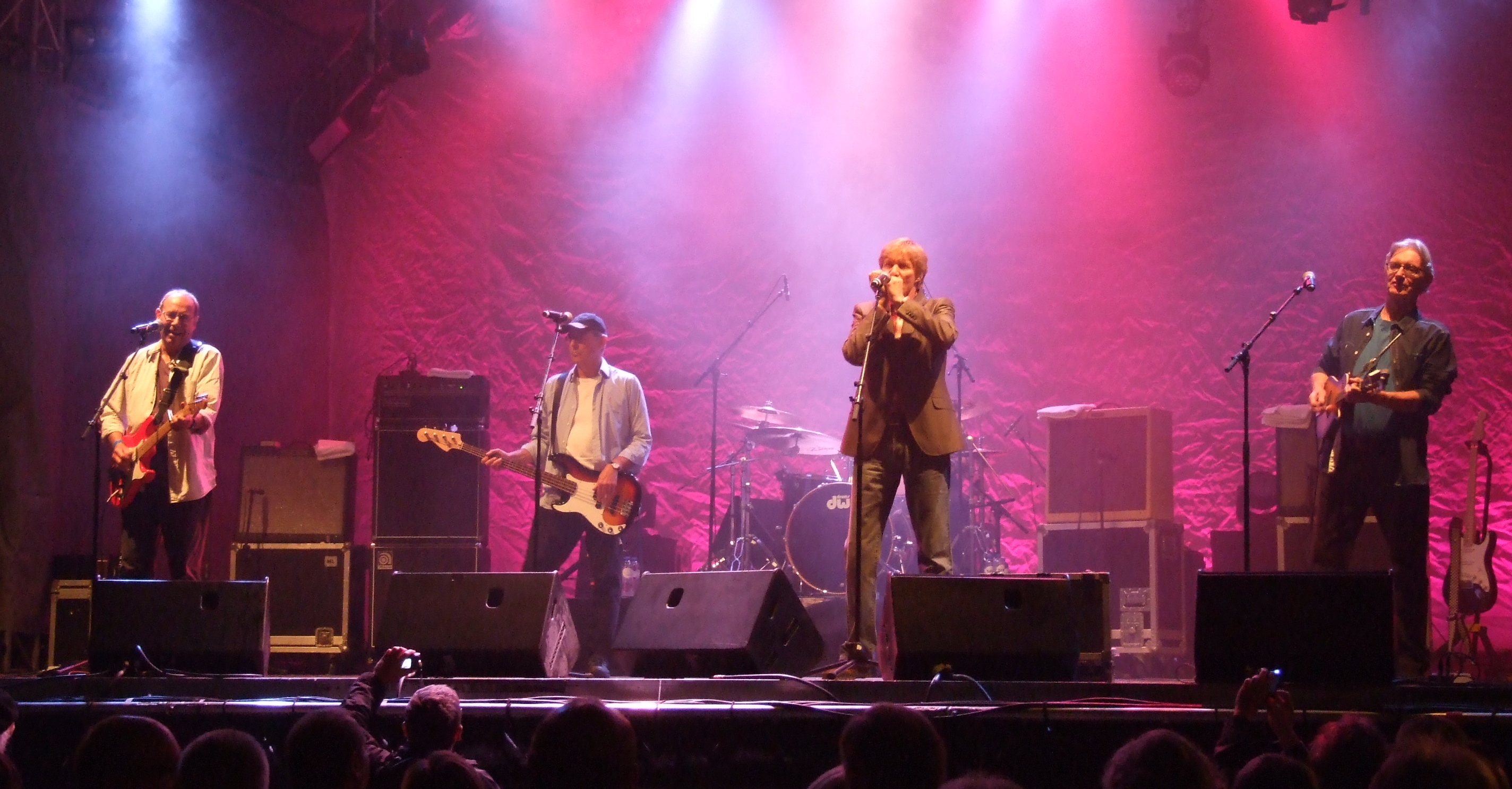
- The Blues Band performing in September 2012

Background information
- Origin: London, United Kingdom
- Genres: Blues, blues rock
- Years active: 1979–1983, 1986–2022
- Label: Arista
- Past members: Paul Jones; Dave Kelly; Gary Fletcher; Tom McGuinness; Hughie Flint; Rob Townsend
- Website: thebluesband.com

The Blues Band were a British blues band formed in 1979 by Paul Jones, former lead vocalist and harmonica player with Manfred Mann, and guitarist Tom McGuinness also of Manfred Mann and The Roosters. The band's first line-up also included bassist Gary Fletcher, slide-guitarist Dave Kelly who had previously played with The John Dummer Band, Howling Wolf and John Lee Hooker and drummer Hughie Flint, of John Mayall's Blues Breakers and McGuinness Flint, the band he formed with Tom McGuinness. In 1982, Flint left and was replaced by former Family drummer Rob Townsend. The group broke up in 2022.

== History ==
Their first album The Official Blues Band Bootleg Album, a mixture of blues standards and original songs featured the Jones and McGuinness composition "Come on In" and their long-standing stage favourite "Flatfoot Sam". This album initially attracted no interest from major record companies, so the band pressed a limited run of 3,000, hand-stamped their logo on the cardboard sleeve and signed them all. After unqualified endorsement from BBC Radio 1 presenter Simon Bates and others, media interest resulted in a recording contract with Arista Records, who re-released the album under the same title. After that they released Ready, Itchy Feet and Brand Loyalty albums and regularly toured through Europe.

They briefly disbanded after recording a live album Bye Bye Blues (1983), but reformed three years later. In 1995, they unveiled their version of the 'Unplugged' craze, but rather than a MTV event, Wire Less was recorded at the Snape Maltings in Aldeburgh, Suffolk. They later recorded albums such as Stepping Out (2002) and Thank You Brother Ray (2004), which paid tribute to Ray Charles.

In 2022, the Blues Band marked their final live performances with the release of their last studio album, So Long. Their last live performance saw a rejuvenated band, with Dave Kelly's son standing in for Rob Townsend, headlining at Bunkfest in Wallingford, Oxfordshire.

== Discography ==
=== Albums ===
- The Official Blues Band Bootleg Album (1980). Number 40 UK
- Ready (1980). Number 36 UK
- Itchy Feet (1981). Number 60 UK
- Brand Loyalty (1982)
- Bye-Bye Blues (1983)
- These Kind of Blues (1986)
- Back for More (1989)
- Fat City (1991)
- Homage (1993)
- Wire Less (1995)
- Live at the BBC (1996)
- 18 Years Old and Alive (1996)
- The Best of The Blues Band (1999) US only
- Brassed Up (1999)
- Scratching on my Screen (2001)
- Green Stuff (2001)
- Stepping Out (2002)
- Be My Guest (2003) (Best of guest appearances)
- Thank You Brother Ray (2005)
- Few Short Lines (2011)
- The Rooster Crowed (2018)
- Bye Bye Blues Band (2021)
- So Long (2022)

=== Compilation albums ===
- Live at Kent Custom Bike Show (1988) Cassette only

=== Chart EP ===
- "Maggie's Farm"/"Ain't It Tuff"/"Diddy Wah Diddy"/"Back Door Man" (1980) Number 68 – UK

=== Singles ===
- "Come on In" / "The Blues Band Song" (1980)
- "Find Yourself Another Fool" / "SUS Blues" (1980)
- "Nadine" / "That's All Right" (1980) (Two live tracks issued free with early copies of Ready)
- "Who's Right, Who's Wrong?" / "Itchy Feet" (1981)
- "Come On" / "Green Stuff" (1981)
- "Take Me Home" / "So Bad" (1982)
- "Hey Hey Little Girl" / "SUS Blues" (1982) (Limited edition live single)
- "Seemed Like a Good Idea" / "Rolling Log" (1982)
- "Blue Collar" / "Duisburg Blues" (1989) (Promo for Back for More)

=== DVDs ===
- Across Borders – Live (2004)
- The Blues Band in Concert : Steppin' Out on Main (2004)
- The Blues Band:Bungay Jumpin' Live (2009)
- The Blues Band:Official Blues Band Bootleg DVD-DeLIVEred (2009)
- Rock Goes To College: The Blues Band, 22 May 1980, Keele University (2015) (DVD/CD)
