= Mike d'Abo =

English singer and songwriter (born 1944)

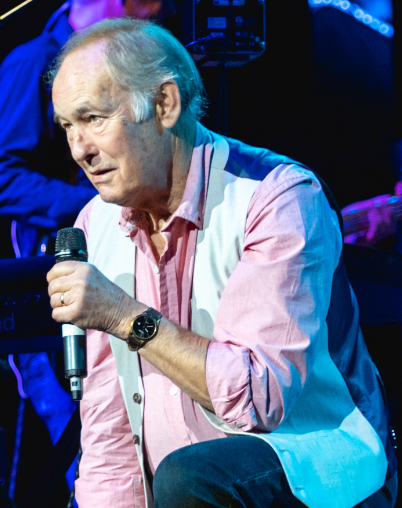
- d'Abo in 2021

Background information
- Born: Michael David d'Abo; 1 March 1944 (age 82); Betchworth, Surrey, England
- Genres: Rock; pop; folk
- Occupations: Singer-songwriter; musician
- Instruments: Vocals; piano; guitar
- Years active: 1960s–present
- Website: Official website

Michael David d'Abo (born 1 March 1944) is an English singer and songwriter, best known as the lead vocalist of Manfred Mann from 1966 to the group's dissolution in 1969, and as the composer of the songs "Handbags and Gladrags" and "Build Me Up Buttercup", the latter of which was a hit for the Foundations. With Manfred Mann, d'Abo achieved six top twenty hits on the UK Singles Chart, including "Semi-Detached, Suburban Mr. James", "Ha! Ha! Said the Clown" and the chart topper "Mighty Quinn". He is the father of actress Olivia d'Abo.

== Early years ==
D'Abo was born in Betchworth, Surrey, the son of Dorothy Primrose (née Harbord) and Edward Nassau Nicolai d'Abo, a London stockbroker. His d'Abo heritage is via the Netherlands and the Dutch East Indies; his maternal line includes Edward Harbord, 3rd Baron Suffield (1781–1835). He was educated at Wellesley House Prep School in Kent, then at Harrow School and Selwyn College, Cambridge. D'Abo's original intention at Cambridge was to read theology and become a priest but, faced with "everything to learn" (not least Classical Greek and Hebrew), and a disconnect between the "strange, impractical philosophy" he was being taught and his idealism about "bringing comfort to people" and spreading "understanding in the world," he "became wholly disillusioned" (Rave, November 1966). He switched to economics, also unsuccessfully, and left Cambridge with "a first class jazz collection" but without completing his studies.

== Career ==
=== A Band of Angels ===
His musical career began while he was still at Harrow School. He had minor success with a group of Old Harrovians, A Band of Angels, that had their own comic strip in a UK pop music weekly, Fab 208. A Band of Angels did not make the big time and d'Abo later reflected on what had gone wrong for them: "We weren't right for each other. We weren't a group. They didn't want me to be too outstanding, a thing that happens naturally in most groups.... Also we looked old-fashioned when we started. I knew I looked wrong but I didn't want to change, I looked like me and what I am. It is just lucky that fashion now agrees with me" (Rave, November 1966).

=== Manfred Mann ===
In July 1966, after leaving A Band of Angels, D’Abo joined Manfred Mann, an established chart-topping group, as a replacement for lead singer Paul Jones, who was leaving to start a solo career. Comparisons between d'Abo and Jones (whom d'Abo physically resembled) became a media preoccupation at the time of the switch, but d'Abo wasted little time dwelling upon it. "I enjoy being with the group," he told Pete Goodman. "We really do have an enormously wide range of musical tastes among us."

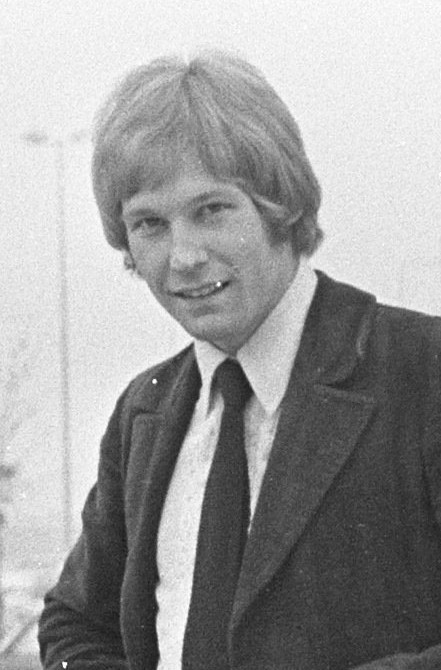
d'Abo in 1967

D'Abo's first big hit with Manfred Mann was "Semi-Detached Suburban Mr James". It was nearly recorded with "Mr Jones" in the title before it occurred to the group that it might be interpreted as a reference to Paul Jones. D'Abo then helped record Manfred Mann's As Is album (with the attaching single of the Bob Dylan-penned "Just Like a Woman"). All of the UK Fontana and US Mercury releases featured d'Abo.

He composed and produced Chris Farlowe's "Handbags and Gladrags", a hit single (which was also notably recorded by Rod Stewart and Stereophonics and subsequently became the theme music to the BBC television show The Office) and "The Last Goodbye". He also wrote two songs recorded by Rod Stewart on Immediate Records: "Little Miss Understood" and "So Much to Say (So Little Time)". With d'Abo fronting, Manfred Mann enjoyed numerous hits, including "Ragamuffin Man", "Ha! Ha! Said the Clown", "My Name is Jack" and the Dylan-penned number one hit, "Quinn the Eskimo (The Mighty Quinn)", which they retitled simply "Mighty Quinn". Manfred Mann subsequently disbanded in 1969.

=== After Manfred Mann ===
In 1968, he and Tony Macaulay co-wrote "Build Me Up Buttercup", which was recorded by The Foundations and sold over four million copies by April 1969, including one million discs in the United States.

In December 1968, d'Abo played the lead in Gulliver Travels (subtly, not Gulliver's Travels) at the Mermaid Theatre, Blackfriars, London and he also portrayed Herod on the original recording of Jesus Christ Superstar. He had a short role on the original recording of Evita. He also wrote "Loving Cup" for The Fortunes and "Mary, Won't You Warm My Bed" for Colin Blunstone. In 1970, he composed and performed the music for the Peter Sellers film There's a Girl in My Soup, and played John Lennon in No One was Saved at the Royal Court Theatre Schools scheme. D'Abo also worked with Mike Smith, the former keyboard player of the Dave Clark Five. In 1976, they released an album on the CBS (UK) label, Smith & d'Abo.

=== Radio ===
In 1997, d'Abo presented a programme on BBC Radio Bristol, "The Golden Years", playing music from the 1950s onwards; it broadcast on Saturdays on BBC Radio Gloucestershire. BBC Wiltshire Sound subsequently added the programme to their schedules.

During the 1990s, he also presented "Late Night West", a popular weeknightly programme on west-of-England local radio for five nights a week, that included music, competitions, and a listener phone-in. In the late 1990s, he contributed to The Mike d'Abo Story, a documentary written by Geoff Leonard, narrated and produced by Phil Vowels, and broadcast on BBC Radio Bristol and BBC Radio Gloucestershire.

He also presented a number of programmes on BBC Radio 2 in 1986 and 1987.

=== The Manfreds ===
The original members of Manfred Mann, minus keyboard player Mann, reformed in 1991 to celebrate guitarist Tom McGuinness's 50th birthday, and to promote a Manfred Mann compilation released around the same time. The absence of Mann forced them to adopt a different name.

Like Rob Townsend and Mike Hugg, d'Abo has also halted tours within recent years. According to the Manfreds website: "Nowadays, Mike d’Abo will only appear on a select few Manfreds date".

== Family ==
D'abo has been married three times. His first marriage was to model Maggie London in 1967. They had two children: Ben d'Abo (born 1967) and Olivia d'Abo (born 1969). His second wife was Karen and they had one son, Bruno d'Abo. His third marriage was to Lisa Weaver in 1996, which produced twins Ella and Louis in July 2007. He is a first cousin of actress Maryam d'Abo. His sister Carol is widow of the late Conservative MP and minister Sir Nicholas Baker.

== Discography ==
Year	Album	Label
1970	Jesus Christ Superstar	Decca/MCA/Decca Broadway
1970	d'Abo	UNI
1972	Down at Rachel's Place	A&M
1974	Broken Rainbows	A&M
1987	Indestructible	President
1988	Tomorrow's Troubador	President
2001	The Mike D'Abo Collection, Vol. 1: 1964–1970 – Handbags & Gladrags	RPM
2003	A Little Miss Understood: Mike d'Abo Collection, Vol. 2	RPM
2004	Handbags and Gladrags: The Mike D'Abo Songbook	President
2004	Hidden Gems & Treasured Friends	Angel Air
