= Lyn Dobson =

British musician (born 1939)

- Born: 22 June 1939; Bedford, Befordshire, England
- Genres: Jazz rock
- Occupation: Musician
- Instruments: Flute; saxophone; citar
- Years active: 1960s-1990s

Lyn Dobson (born 22 June 1939 in Bedford) is an English musician, noted as a jazz-rock flautist and saxophonist. He appeared with Georgie Fame and the Blue Flames and Manfred Mann in the mid-1960s, and then with Soft Machine and Keef Hartley, as well as playing on albums by Nick Drake and John Martyn. Dobson played the flute solo o{ Manfred Mann's "Pretty Flamingo". Dobson also played on a number of sessions for Small Faces, including their Ogdens' Nut Gone Flake LP, and the track "The Autumn Stone" (released after the group split in 1969 and on which he played the flute), and he performed live with them during 1968. He also subsequently guested on Humble Pie's debut album As Safe as Yesterday Is (1969), on which he also played sitar.

He released an album, Jam Sandwich, on Fresh Air Records in 1974.

After the 1970s, he worked in theatre, dance, drama, multimedia, music teaching and music therapy. In the 1990s, Dobson recorded two albums with the Third Ear Band.

In 2006 Dobson was living and performing with various groups in Chania, Crete.

== See also ==
- Henry Lowther
- Harold McNair
- Elton Dean
- Mike Vickers
