= Pretty Flamingo =

- Norwegian picture sleeve

Single by Manfred Mann
- B-side: "You're Standing By"
- Released: 15 April 1966
- Recorded: 18 March 1966
- Studio: EMI, London
- Genre: Sunshine pop
- Length: 2:31
- Label: His Master's Voice POP 1523
- Songwriter: Mark Barkan
- Producer: John Burgess

Manfred Mann singles chronology
"If You Gotta Go, Go Now" (1965)	"Pretty Flamingo" (1966)	"You Gave Me Somebody to Love" (1966)

"Pretty Flamingo" is a song written by Mark Barkan, which became a hit in 1966 when Manfred Mann's recording of it was released as a single. This single reached number one in the UK Singles Chart on 5 May 1966, and was a minor hit in the United States where it spent eight weeks on Billboard's Hot 100 chart, peaking at number 29 during the week of 6 August 1966. It was also successful in Ireland; it was number one there for four weeks, keeping the Rolling Stones' "Paint It Black" at number two.

== Song profile ==
The narrator of the song describes a woman—whom "all of the guys call [...] 'Flamingo', 'cause her hair glows like the sun and her eyes can light the sky"—for whom the narrator has fallen, and his plans to win her affection. Songwriter Mark Barkan's daughter said that this was based on a girl who lived above a parking lot in his neighborhood: Barkan and his friends used to call out to her.

The original demo of the song was recorded by New York City–based American vocalist Jimmy Radcliffe, stylized for the Drifters; but Barkan was dissatisfied with the overly produced results, and had Radcliffe recut the song with a pared-down arrangement.

The Manfred Mann recording featured future Cream bassist Jack Bruce, who briefly joined the band in 1965; the flute solo was played by Lyn Dobson. The recording was engineered by Geoff Emerick – then only 20 years old – who eventually became well known for his work with the Beatles.

After Barkan's death in 2020, Paul Jones of Manfred Mann said: "I'm a little bit ashamed to admit that not only did I never meet him, but I never even got in touch with him and said thank you for the song. But I would like to thank him posthumously."

Cash Box described "Pretty Flamingo" as an "easy-going, teen-angled item about a rather fickle young gal". In its review of Tommy Vann's contemporaneous single release, Cash Box described the song as a "romantic ode all about a fella who aspires to one day snare a real special gal".

== Charts ==
Chart (1966)	Peak position
Canada RPM 100	2
Finland (Soumen Virallinen)	28
Ireland (IRMA)	1
West Germany (GfK)	12
Netherlands (Single Top 100)	15
New Zealand (Listener)	1
Norway (VG-lista)	3
Rhodesia (Lyons Maid Hits of the Week)	1
Sweden (Kvällstoppen)	6
UK Singles (Official Charts)	1
US Billboard Hot 100	29
