= Paul Jones (singer) =

English musician (born 1942)

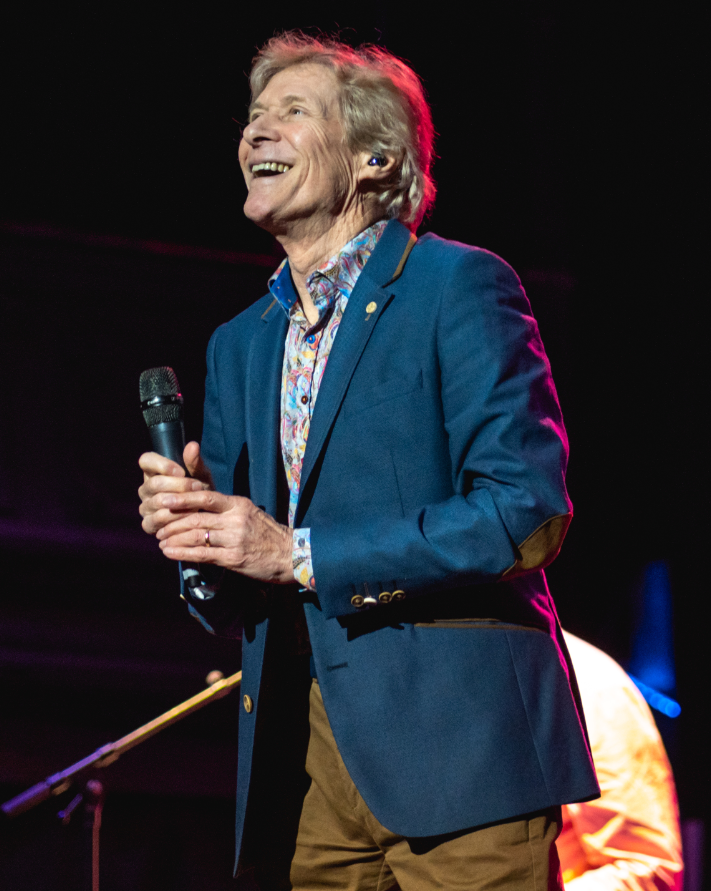
- Jones in 2021

Background information
- Also known as: P.P. Jones
- Born: Paul Adrian Pond; 24 February 1942 (age 84); Portsmouth, England
- Genres: Pop; blues
- Occupations: Singer; musician; actor; presenter
- Instruments: Vocals; harmonica
- Years active: 1960s–present
- Labels: Columbia; EMI; His Master's Voice; RSO; Stage Door
- Member of: The Manfreds
- Formerly of: Manfred Mann; The Blues Band
- Website: Official website

Paul Jones (born Paul Adrian Pond, 24 February 1942) is an English singer, actor, harmonicist, radio personality and television presenter. He first came to prominence as the original lead singer and harmonicist of the rock band Manfred Mann (1962–1966) with whom he had several hit records including "Do Wah Diddy Diddy" (UK #1, US #1) and "Pretty Flamingo" (UK #1).

After leaving the band, Jones established a solo career and starred as a deified pop star in the 1967 film Privilege. In 1979, he formed The Blues Band, and toured with them until their breakup in 2022. He presented The Blues Show on BBC Radio 2 for 33 years, from 1985 to 2018, and continues to perform alongside former Manfred Mann bandmates in The Manfreds.

== Early life ==
Paul Jones was born Paul Adrian Pond in Portsmouth, Hampshire, son of Norman Henry Pond and Amelia Josephine, née Hadfield, later of Worthing, West Sussex.

Jones attended The Portsmouth Grammar School, moving to the Edinburgh Academy for his last two years of school before winning an Open Exhibition in English to Jesus College, Oxford, although he did not graduate.

== Career ==
=== 1960s ===
Jones began singing in the early 1960s as "P.P. Jones", where he performed duets with Elmo Lewis who was later better known as future founder member of the Rolling Stones, Brian Jones at the Ealing Club, home of Alexis Korner's Blues Incorporated, whose singers included Long John Baldry and Mick Jagger. He was asked by Keith Richards and Brian Jones to be the lead singer of a group they were forming, but he turned them down.

=== Manfred Mann: 1964–1966 ===
Jones went on to become the vocalist and harmonica player of the successful 1960s group Manfred Mann, when he was hired by Manfred Mann and Mike Hugg to join their blues band "The Mann–Hugg blues band". Paul Jones had several Top Ten hits with Manfred Mann, and sang on two of their three UK number one charting songs: "Do Wah Diddy Diddy" (1964) and "Pretty Flamingo" (1966), before going solo in July 1966. Jones remained on his recording contract with EMI. As a soloist, he was less successful without the band than they were with his replacement, Mike d'Abo.

=== Solo: 1966–1969 ===
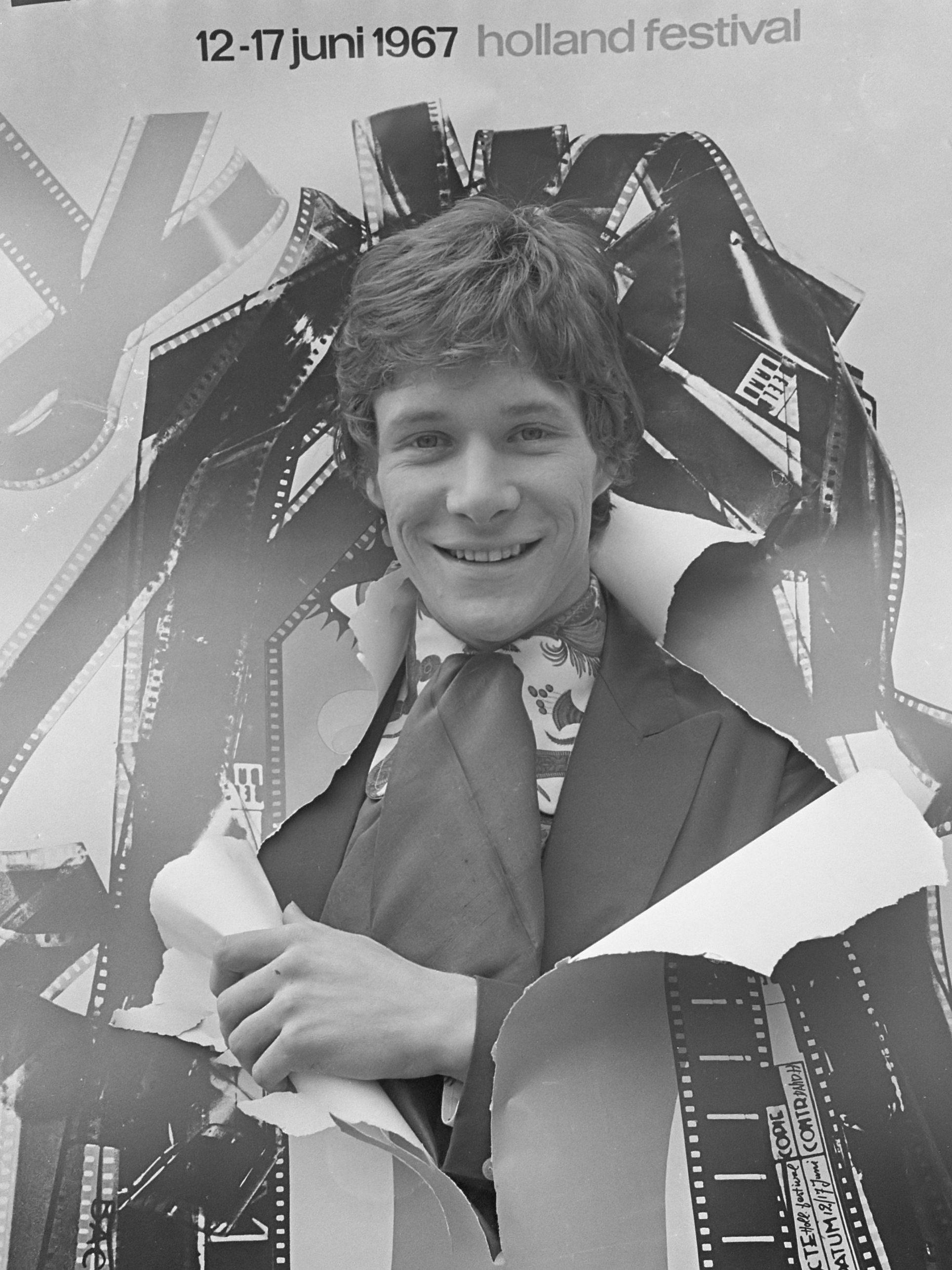
Jones in 1967

In the mid-1960s, Jones released a few hit 45s, notably with "High Time" (1966) (UK no. 4), "I've Been a Bad, Bad Boy" (1967) (UK no. 5) and "Thinkin' Ain't for Me" (1967) (UK no. 32), before branching out into acting. While his solo career in the UK was mildly successful, he sold few records in the United States. During the 1960s, Jones found his biggest success in Sweden, where he charted 10 top-ten singles on Tio i Topp between 1966 and 1970, including the number one single "Thinkin' Ain't For Me" in 1967. This was enough to warrant EMI in Sweden to issue a greatest hits album of his material in 1968. His subsequent single releases in Britain in the late 1960s were on Columbia.

In 1967, Jones starred opposite model Jean Shrimpton in the 1967 film Privilege directed by Peter Watkins. He was cast as a pop singer in the film, and sang the songs "I've Been a Bad, Bad Boy" and "Free Me", which Patti Smith covered in the 1970s, and Darren Hayman & Papernut Cambridge covered in 2016. The following year, he was the central figure in another cult classic, the 1968 experimental British satire, The Committee, directed by Peter Sykes, but this time the musical duties were handled by Pink Floyd and Arthur Brown.

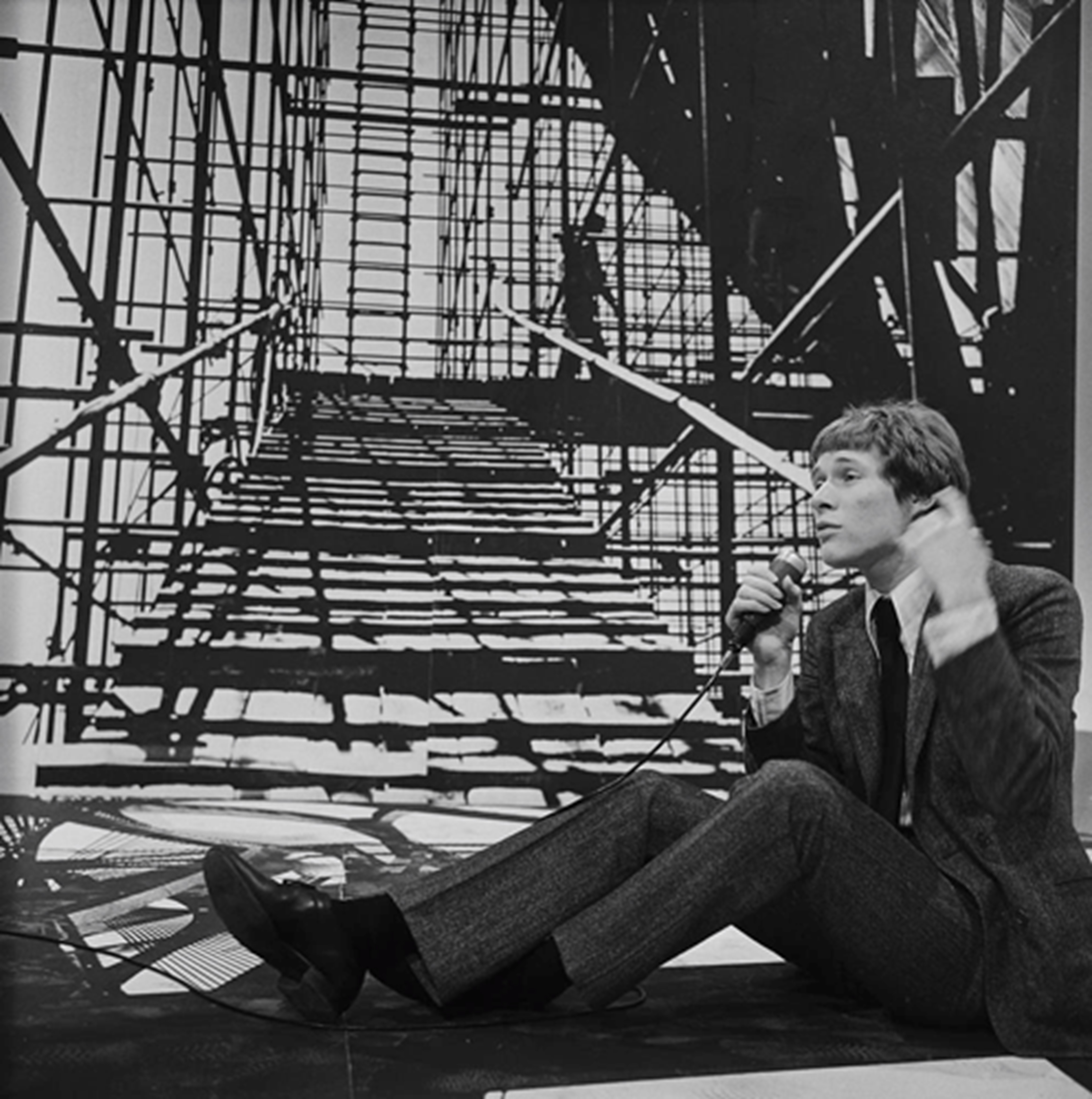
Jones on the Dutch television programme Fanclub, 1967

In January 1968, Jones was part of the "Big Show" package tour of Australia and New Zealand with The Who and Small Faces. Jones was backed by a different local band in each country. The tour is notorious for the conflicts with conservative mainstream Australian media reporters. In addition, an in-flight incident on their last day in Australia resulted in the tour members being detained by airport security and police before being ushered onto a flight to New Zealand.

By the late 1960s, Jones had released four solo albums: My Way (1966), Sings Songs From The Film Privilege (1967), Love Me, Love My Friends (1968), and Come into My Music Box (1969).

=== 1970s ===
In 1971 Jones participated in Carla Bley's album Escalator Over the Hill. On the same year he recorded Crucifix in a Horseshoe with White Cloud, a New York-based session group featuring Teddy Wender on keyboards and Kenny Kosek on fiddle. He acted in the 1972 horror film Demons of the Mind.

In 1973 Jones guest appeared in ITC The Protectors, in an episode called "Goodbye George", playing a character called Caspar Parton. He also appeared in ITC-RAI Space: 1999, in the episode "Black Sun", playing a character called Michael Ryan.

In 1975 he guest-starred in a TV episode of The Sweeney ("Chalk and Cheese") as Tommy Garret, a boxer-turned-highwayman. In 1976 he performed the role of Juan Peron on the original concept album of Tim Rice and Andrew Lloyd Webber's musical Evita alongside Julie Covington as Eva, Colm Wilkinson as Che and Barbara Dickson as the Mistress. Jones had previously worked with Covington in the 1975 Christmas production Great Big Groovy Horse, a rock opera based on the story of the Trojan Horse shown on BBC2. It was later repeated on BBC1 in 1977. He also presented the BBC1 children's quiz Beat the Teacher in the mid-1980s. His gold albums include one for Evita.

In October 1977, he starred as Sir Francis Drake in the musical premiere of Drake's Dream at the Connaught Theatre, Worthing featuring music and lyrics by Lynne and Richard Riley and book by Simon Brett. The production was directed by Nicolas Young and transferred to London's Shaftesbury Theatre for a limited season opening on 7 December 1977. The Drake's Dream Original London Cast Album was recorded by President Records in 1977 and released on CD in 2017 by Stage Door Records.

In 1978 he released a single on the RSO label, consisting of orchestrated versions of the Sex Pistols' "Pretty Vacant" and the Ramones' "Sheena Is a Punk Rocker", both produced by Rice. In the same year Jones also guested on Radio Stars' second album Holiday Album, playing harmonica. Four years later he appeared as one of the guest vocalists on the British Electric Foundation's Music of Quality and Distinction, on a new version of "There's a Ghost in My House".

=== The Blues Band: 1979–2022 ===
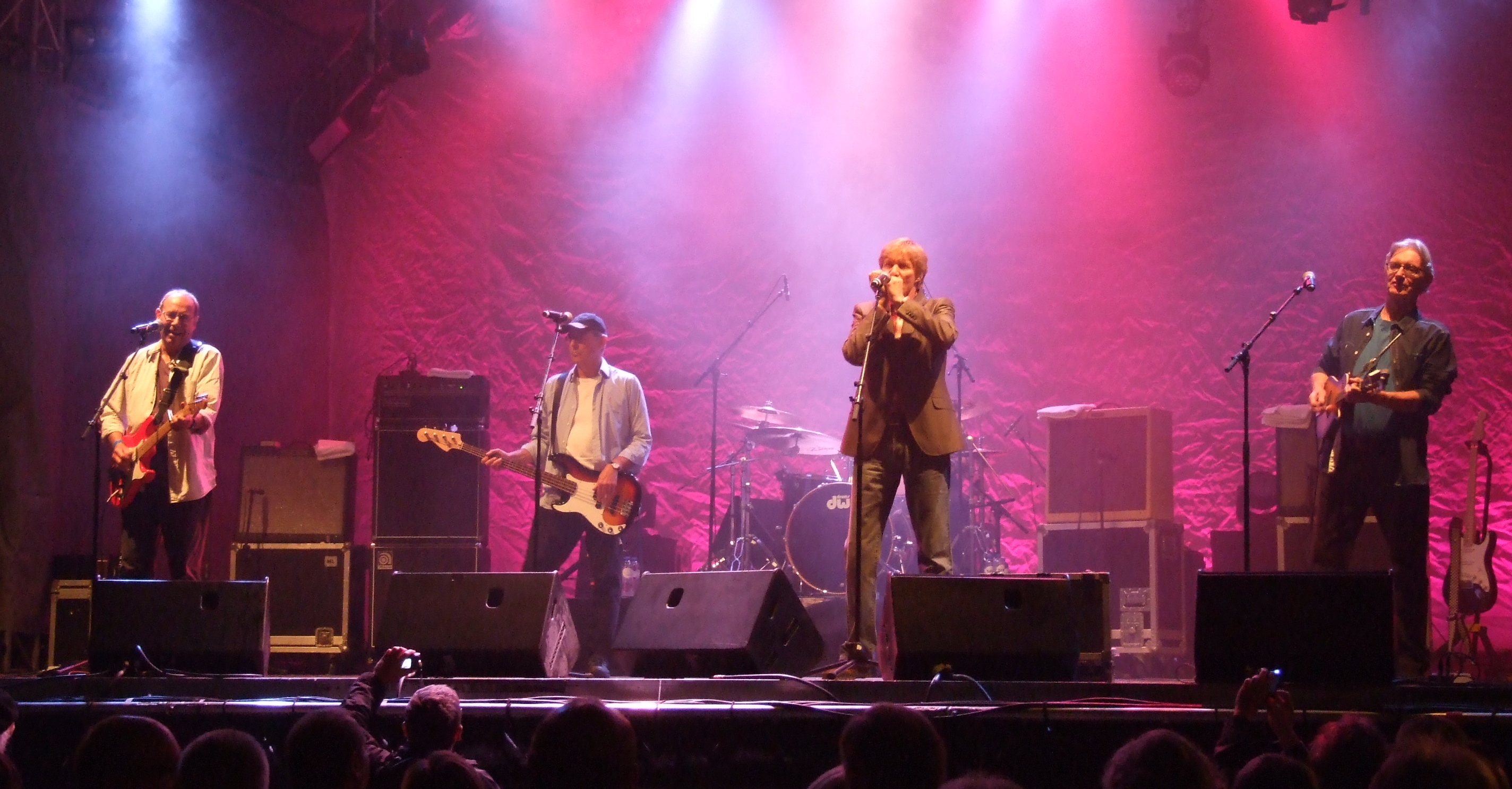
Jones (centre stage) with The Blue Band in 2012

In 1979, he founded the Blues Band with former Manfred Tom McGuinness. Also a part of the original lineup included McGuinness from Manfred Mann, drummer Hughie Flint from John Mayall & the Bluesbreakers, and McGuinness' other band McGuinness Flint, guitarist Dave Kelly, and bassist Gary Fletcher. The band released twenty-three albums, and from 1982 onwards had Rob Townsend of Family on drums in place of Flint. The Blues Band released their final album, So Long, and performed their final gigs in 2022.

=== 1980s ===
In autumn 1982, Jones took over the lead part of Sky Masterson from Ian Charleson in Richard Eyre's company in his celebrated production for the National Theatre of Guys and Dolls that had begun in February that year at the Olivier Theatre. He then led the same cast as Macheath in Eyre's production of The Beggar's Opera by John Gay at the Cottesloe Theatre.

In 1984/85, he appeared in the West End and touring musical Pump Boys and Dinettes.

After an initial run of three programmes in 1985, he started presenting a series for BBC Radio 2 on rhythm and blues on 10 April 1986, later to be known as The Blues Show, which became a fixture in the schedules for 32 years. He played the harmonica on his programme's Radio 2 jingle.

In 1987, he starred as Fred/Petruchio with Nichola McAuliffe as Lilli/Kate in the Royal Shakespeare Company's successful production of Kiss Me Kate both at the Royal Shakespeare Theatre, Stratford-upon-Avon, and the Old Vic Theatre, London.

=== 1990s ===
From 1990 to 1993, Jones starred as the title character of Uncle Jack, a children's programme on BBC 1, which also featured Fenella Fielding as Jack's adversary; The Vixen. His character was Jack Green, an environmentalist and undercover agent for MI5, who with his family are on a mission to save the planet.

=== The Manfreds: 1991–present ===
In 1991, Jones formed the Manfreds with most of the original members of Manfred Mann, to both celebrate McGuinness' 50th birthday and a new Manfred Mann compilation album. This new band did not include Manfred Mann himself, meaning they couldn't tour under the name and "The Manfreds" was born. Jones still tours in the Manfreds with McGuinness and d'Abo.

=== 2000s and onwards ===
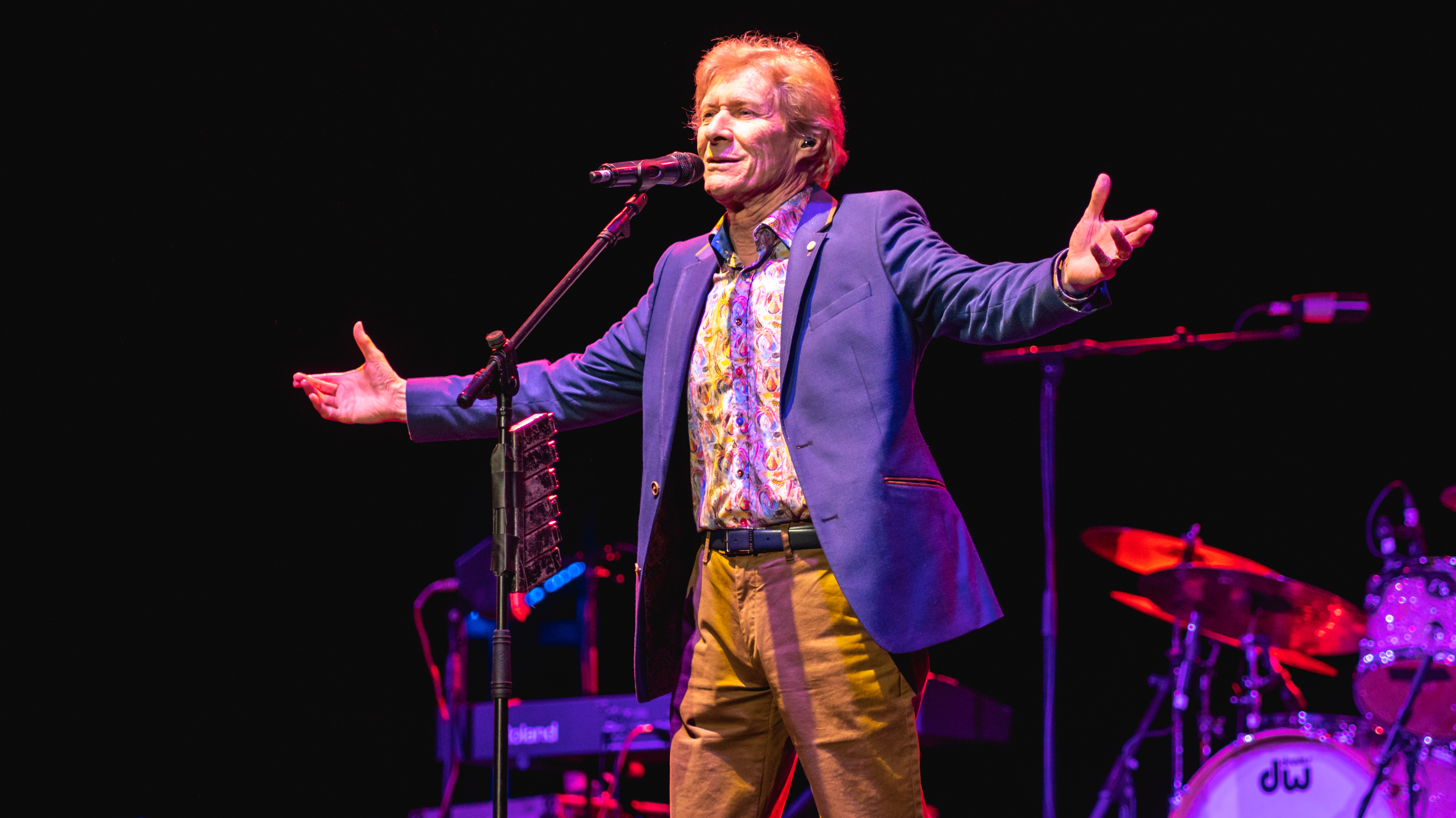
Jones performing with the Manfreds with Georgie Fame, in Chatham, 2021

In 2009, he issued Starting All Over Again on Continental Record Services (aka CRS) in Europe and Collectors' Choice in the US. It was produced by Carla Olson in Los Angeles and features Eric Clapton, Jake Andrews, Ernie Watts, Percy Sledge, Tony Marsico, Michael Thompson and Oren Waters.

On 4 May 2009, Jones and his harmonica featured in a song during a concert by Joe Bonamassa at the Royal Albert Hall in London. That same month Jones featured, playing harmonica, on the release of "I'm Your Kingpin" by Nick Vernier Band. In 2010 he featured on two versions of "You’re Wrong" from Nick Vernier Band's Sessions album.

In 2013, 2014, and 2016, the Manfreds toured to promote a new Manfred Mann compilation album.

In 2015 he released an album Suddenly I Like It, also produced by Carla Olson. Special guests on this album included Joe Bonamassa and Jools Holland.

Jones is currently the president of the HarmonicaUK(formally the National Harmonica League) and was awarded "harmonica player of the year" in the British Blues Awards of 2010, 2011 and 2012, as well as Blues Broadcaster of the year and a Lifetime Achievement award in 2011.

In January 2018 it was announced that he would be replaced as presenter of BBC Radio 2's Blues Show by Cerys Matthews in mid-May. His last broadcast as presenter was on 23 April 2018; his live guest was Eric Bibb and his last song played was Sonny Boy Williamson's "Mighty Long Time" (1951) which he described as "one of my handful of most favourite blues records."

He performed in the December 2023 edition of Jools' Annual Hootenanny. In 2025, he was awarded a Lifetime Achievement Award for his contribution to music and the harmonica, by HarmonicaUK

== Personal life ==
=== Family ===
Jones was first married (1963–1976) to novelist and reviewer Sheila MacLeod. He is now married to Fiona Hendley-Jones. They met whilst both acting at the National Theatre.

=== Religious beliefs ===
Jones converted to Christianity in the mid-1980s as a result of being invited by Cliff Richard to a Luis Palau evangelistic event. Jones had appeared opposite Richard in a 1960s television debate show where he had, at the time, opposed Richard's viewpoint. In December 2013, Jones was featured in BBC One's Songs of Praise, performing and talking with Aled Jones about his faith.

== Solo discography ==
=== Albums ===
Year	Title	Peak chart positions
Year	Title	UK Jazz and Blues
1966	My Way	
1967	Sings Privilege & Others	
1968	Love Me, Love My Friends	
1969	Come into My Music Box	
1972	Crucifix in a Horseshoe	
2009	Starting All Over Again	
2015	Suddenly I Like It	no. 29

=== EPs ===
Title	Album details	Peak chart positions
Title	Album details	UK
Paul Jones Sings Songs from the Film "Privilege"	Released: April 1967; Label: His Master's Voice	1
Paul Jones	Released: October 1977; Label: EMI	—
"—" denotes releases that did not chart.

=== Singles ===
Title	Year	Peak chart positions							
Title	Year	UK	AUS	CAN	GER	IRE	NZ	SA	SWE
"High Time" /	1966	4	34	—	36	—	10	—	16
"I Can't Hold On Much Longer" (US and Canada-only A-side)	1966	—	—	71	—	—	—	—	—
"I've Been a Bad, Bad Boy"	1967	5	12	—	—	10	9	—	9
"Privilege"	1967	—	—	—	—	—	—	—	4
"Thinkin' Ain't for Me"	1967	32	—	—	—	—	—	—	11
"Sons and Lovers"	1967	—	22	—	—	—	8	—	10
"And the Sun Will Shine"	1968	53 (Note: Chart position is from the UK "Breakers List".)	96	—	—	—	—	—	—
"When I Was Six Years Old"	1968	—	—	—	—	—	—	—	6
"Poor Jenny" (New Zealand-only release)	1968	—	—	—	—	—	5	—	—
"My Advice to You" (Sweden-only release)	1968	—	—	—	—	—	—	—	14
"Aquarius"	1968	45	—	—	—	—	—	—	—
"It's Getting Better"	1969	—	52	—	—	—	—	—	—
"I'm Here to Nudge Your Mind" (New Zealand-only release)	1969	—	—	—	—	—	—	—	—
"I'm a Young Boy" (Sweden-only release)	1970	—	—	—	—	—	—	—	—
"Shake a Hand" (New Zealand and Sweden-only release)	1970	—	—	—	—	—	—	—	—
"Life After Death"	1971	—	—	—	—	—	—	—	—
"Mighty Ship" (US and Canada-only release)	1972	—	—	—	—	—	—	—	—
"Wrestler" (Scandinavia-only release)	1972	—	—	—	—	—	—	—	—
"The Pod That Came Back" (US-only release)	1972	—	—	—	—	—	—	—	—
"Perfect Roadie"	1973	—	—	—	—	—	—	—	—
"Love Enough"	1974	—	—	—	—	—	—	—	—
"After All I Sacrificed"	1975	—	—	—	—	—	—	—	—
"Stop, Stop, Stop"	1977	—	—	—	—	—	—	15	—
"Give That Thang to Me"	1977	—	—	—	—	—	—	—	—
"Pretty Vacant" /	1978	—	—	—	—	—	—	—	—
"Sheena Is a Punk Rocker"	1978	—	—	—	—	—	—	—	—
"There's a Ghost in My House"	1982	—	—	—	—	—	—	—	—
"I Could Be So Good for You" (with Marti Webb)	1986	—	—	—	—	—	—	—	—
"—" denotes releases that did not chart or were not released in that territory.

== Filmography ==
=== Film ===
Year	Title	Role	Notes
1967	Privilege	Steven Shorter	
1968	The Committee	Central Figure	
1972	Demons of the Mind	Carl Richter	
1975	Great Big Groovy Horse	Menelaus	Television movie
1976	Sparkle's Tavern	Cowboy	
1979	Traces of Love	PR Man	Television movie

=== Television ===
Year	Title	Role	Notes
1968	ITV Playhouse	Colin Dixon	one episode
1969	Whatever Next?	Romeo	one episode
1970–1978	Jackanory	Storyteller / singer	seventeen episodes
1971	ITV Saturday Night Theatre	Ian	one episode
1972	Z-Cars	Randy Smith	one episode
1973	ABC Afterschool Special	Various roles	one episode
1973	The Protectors	Caspar Parton	one episode
1974	2nd House	Actor in a matter of state	one episode
1975	The Sweeney	Tommy Garret	one episode
1975	Space: 1999	Mike Ryan	one episode
1983	Saturday Stayback	Doctor Roget / prisoner	two episodes
1986	Lady Blue	Musician	one episode
1989	Let's Face the Music		one episode
1990	Uncle Jack	Uncle Jack	twenty-four episodes

== See also ==
- Manfred Mann discography
