= Mike Hugg =

British musician (born 1940)

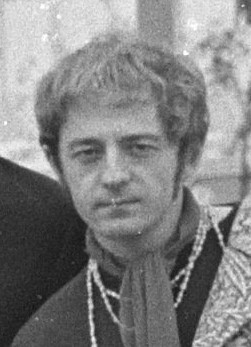
- Hugg in 1967

Background information
- Born: Michael John Hugg; 11 August 1940 (age 86); Gosport, Hampshire, England
- Genres: Jazz; rock; pop; beat; jazz rock; blues
- Occupations: Musician; singer; songwriter
- Instruments: Drums; percussion; keyboards; vibraphone; vocals
- Years active: 1962–present
- Website: www.themanfreds.com/Mikehugg.html

Michael John Hugg (born 11 August 1940) is a British musician who was a founding member of the 1960s group Manfred Mann, and co-founder of the psychedelic jazz-fusion group, Manfred Mann Chapter Three. He is known for his creativity in his music, and made jingles for advertisements.

== Career ==
=== Manfred Mann ===
Hugg first thought about wanting a career in music when he was sixteen years old. Pursuing a career in jazz, he met the pianist Manfred Mann while working as a musician at Butlin's Clacton, and they formed a seven-piece group. The Mann–Hugg Blues Brothers recruited Paul Jones and later Tom McGuinness. Upon their signing with His Master's Voice, their producer, John Burgess, changed their name to Manfred Mann.

Prominent in the Swinging London scene of the 1960s, the group regularly appeared in the UK Singles Chart. Three of their most successful singles, "Do Wah Diddy Diddy", "Pretty Flamingo", and "Mighty Quinn", topped the UK charts. The band's 1964 hit "5-4-3-2-1" was the theme tune for the ITV pop music show Ready Steady Go!. They were also the first southern-England-based group to top the US Billboard Hot 100 during the British Invasion.

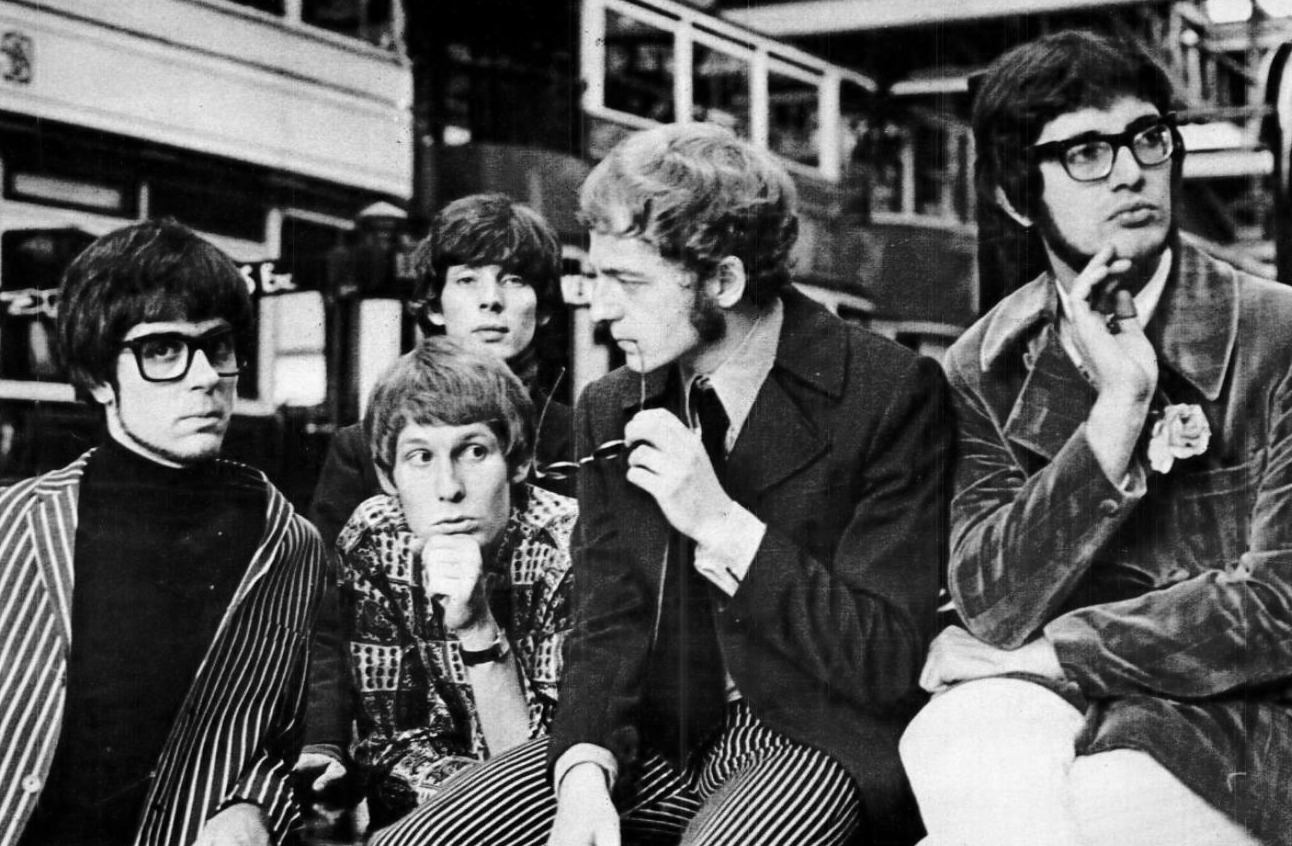
Manfred Mann in 1966. Left to right: Manfred Mann, Mike d'Abo, Klaus Voormann, Mike Hugg, Tom McGuinness

Hugg is a competent pianist and an able vibraphone player, but his main role in Manfred Mann was as drummer. However, he recorded several vibraphone solos with the band (e.g. "I'm your Kingpin") and used the instrument to augment hits such as "Oh No Not My Baby". He was credited as co-writer of the group's early hits and contributed solo compositions throughout its life, including jazzy instrumentals ("Bare Hugg") and wistful acid-pop ("Funniest Gig", "Harry the One Man Band"). His abilities as a songwriter grew throughout the group's career. In 1973, his song "Each and Every Day" which he wrote for Manfred Mann became a Canadian top-ten single when covered by Keith Hampshire.

=== Solo career ===
He and his brother composed "Mister, You're a Better Man Than I" which was recorded by the Yardbirds in 1965. Hugg also composed the majority of the songs for the 1968 Paramount film Up the Junction, as well as co-writing the theme from the BBC sitcom Whatever Happened to the Likely Lads with La Frenais, which was recorded by Hugg's session featuring Tony Rivers on lead vocals.

In 1972, he released his debut solo album, "Somewhere". The next year, "Stress & Strain" was made. In 1975, Hugg was a member of the group "Hug" who released one studio album titled "Neon Dreams". By the early 1980s, he was working with a Fairlight, one of the first computer musical instruments. In 2015, he released a solo album with help from Simon Currie (who is currently in the Manfreds). Hugg formed the acoustic jazz trio PBD.

=== The Manfreds ===
In 1991, Hugg formed The Manfreds with some of the original members of Manfred Mann, without Manfred Mann himself (which was why they were "The Manfreds" instead of being a reformed Manfred Mann) to celebrate the 50th birthday of Tom McGuinness and the release of a new Manfred Mann compilation album. For most of the bands run, it has included Jones, d'Abo, McGuinness, and Hugg. Hugg retired from touring in 2022, but is still turning up with them for private bookings and small gigs. According to Paul Jones, Hugg was the oldest member of Manfred Mann the Manfreds, and his decision to retire from touring was because he had been off from many concerts with "ear problems".

== Discography ==
Solo

- 1972 Somewhere
- 1973 Stress & Strain

Manfred Mann Chapter Three

- 1969 Manfred Mann Chapter Three
- 1970 Manfred Mann Chapter Three Volume Two
- 1971 Manfred Mann Chapter Three Volume Three (unreleased)

Hug

- 1975 Neon Dream

== See also ==
- Manfred Mann
- Manfred Mann discography
- The Manfreds
