= Tom McGuinness (musician) =

English musician (born 1941)

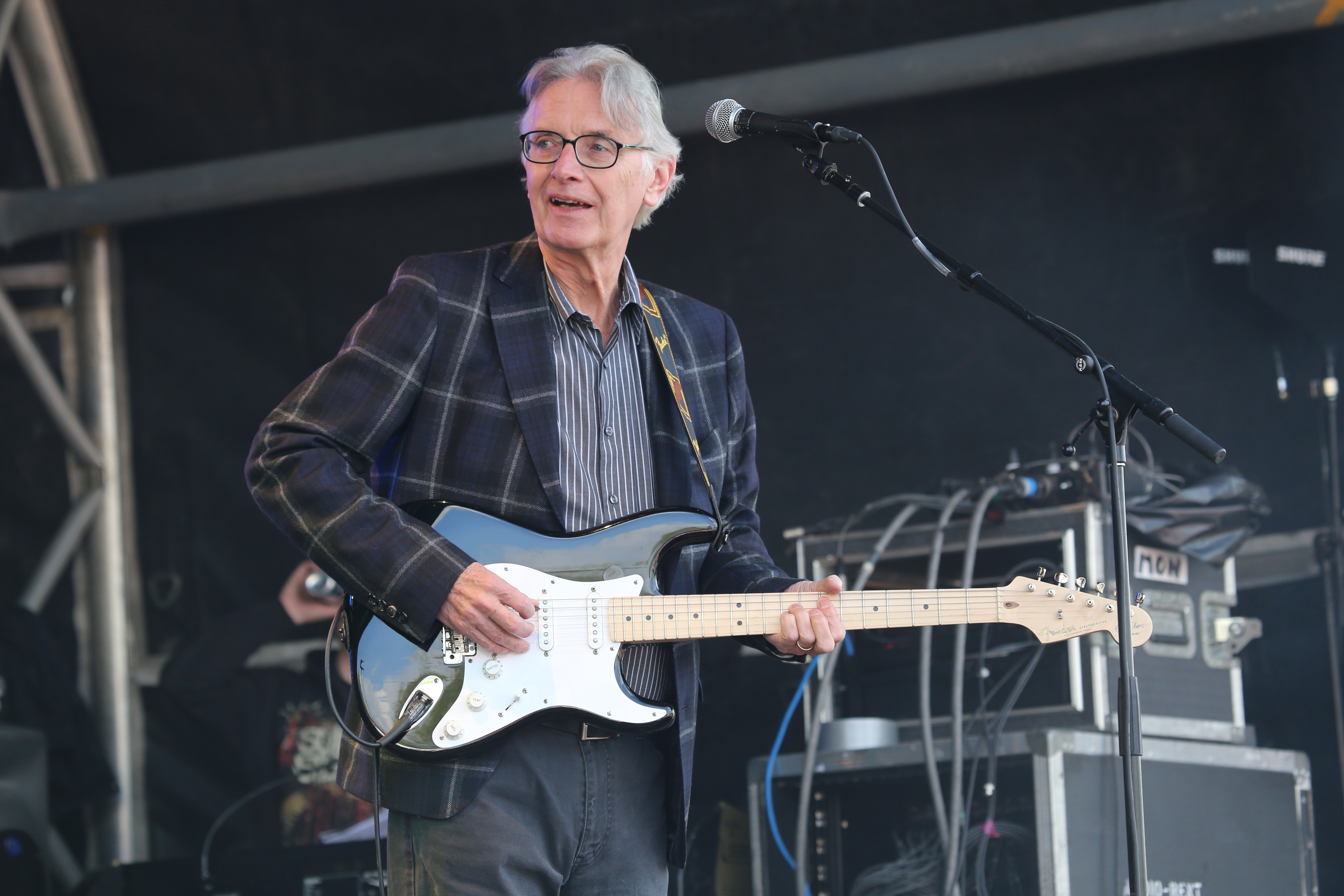
- McGuinness in 2013

Background information
- Born: Thomas John Patrick McGuinness; 2 December 1941 (age 84); Wimbledon, England
- Genres: Rock; pop; blues
- Occupation: Musician
- Instruments: Guitar; bass; vocals
- Years active: 1960s–present
- Member of: The Manfreds
- Formerly of: Manfred Mann; The Blues Band

Thomas John Patrick McGuinness (born 2 December 1941) is an English guitarist, singer and songwriter who played guitar and bass with rock band Manfred Mann, among others, before becoming a record and television producer. He currently performs with The Manfreds, a continuation of Manfred Mann, that currently features McGuinness and original lead singer Paul Jones.

== Early life ==
McGuinness was born to Irish parents in Wimbledon, South London in 1941. His mother was from Glandore, a village in County Cork, and his father from Edgeworthstown, in County Longford.

McGuinness learned how to play guitar by playing along to Lonnie Donegan records. One of his first bands, The Roosters, included an 18-year-old Eric Clapton on lead guitar.

== Career ==
=== Manfred Mann ===
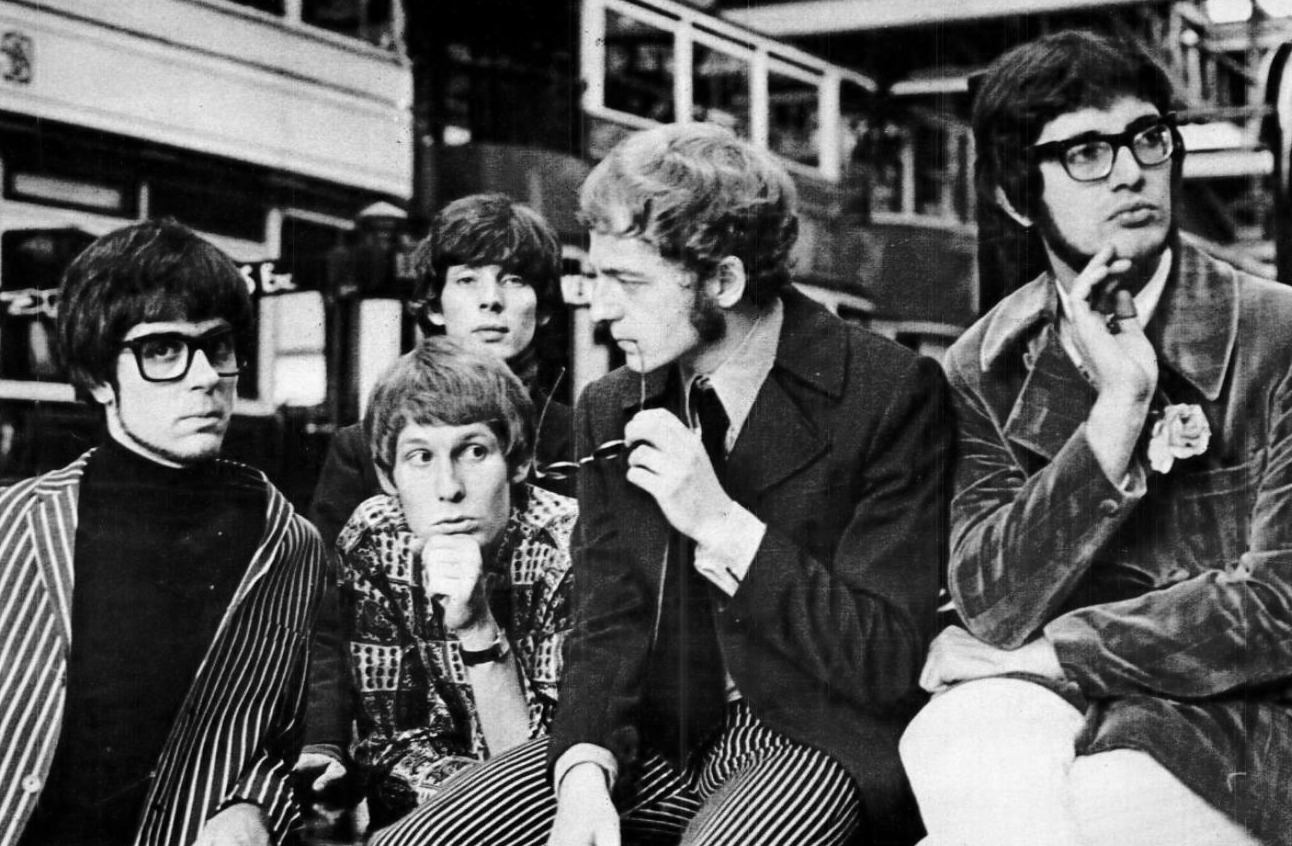
Manfred Mann in 1966, McGuinness is sitting on the far right

Following a stint in the short-lived Roosters with Eric Clapton, McGuinness joined the 1960s group Manfred Mann as a bassist, after answering an advert in an issue of Melody Maker. Through the advert, he met blues singer Paul Jones, who was fronting Manfred Mann, and through Jones joined the band. As the band sought to transform itself from jazz into a rhythm-and-blues-orientated group, he took over bass duties from Dave Richmond and received joint songwriting credits on the group's early hits. Explaining how he came into the group, McGuinness said, "They had a great bass guitarist, but he was into Charles Mingus and things like that, which the whole band was. But he refused to play simple bass lines that would fit Bo Diddley numbers. He'd play incredible 3/4 lines and things like that. So I came in and I had the overwhelming advantage of not really being able to play the bass guitar, so I played simple." Appointed the writer of album sleeve notes, he took the opportunity to identify himself as "the nastiest in the group".

When Mike Vickers and then Paul Jones left the band, McGuinness took over the guitarist role; Jack Bruce then played bass until replaced by Klaus Voormann. McGuinness' National Steel guitar became an important part of the group's sound, and featured on hits such as "Pretty Flamingo". He composed a few album tracks for the group, notably "L.S.D." (from Mann Made), "One Way", and "Cubist Town" (from Mighty Garvey!).

In total, the band had a successful run in the 60s pop music scene. Three of their most successful singles, "Do Wah Diddy Diddy", "Pretty Flamingo", and "Mighty Quinn", topped the UK charts. They were also the first southern-England-based group to top the US Billboard Hot 100 during the British Invasion.

=== McGuinness Flint ===
After Manfred Mann disbanded in 1969, he formed McGuinness Flint with Hughie Flint, which disbanded in 1975.

Their first single "When I'm Dead and Gone" reached No. 2 on the UK Singles Chart at the end of 1970 (losing the number one spot to Clive Dunn's Grandad), No. 47 on the Billboard pop chart and No. 35 on the Cashbox pop chart in the U.S., No. 5 in Ireland, and No. 31 in Canada.) The debut album McGuinness Flint also made the Top 10 of the UK Albums Chart. In 1999, it received another outing, in the soundtrack of the film, East is East. A follow-up single, "Malt and Barley Blues", was a UK No. 5 hit in 1971 and peaked at No. 15 in Ireland.

=== The Blues Band and The Manfreds ===
In 1977, McGuinness formed Stonebridge McGuinness with Lou Stonebridge, and had a minor hit single. In 1979, four years after McGuinness Flint split up, both founded The Blues Band. Also including Paul Jones, it went on hiatus in 1983, shortly after recording a live album, and regrouped in 1986. It played its last performance in 2022, soon after releasing the last studio album So Long.

In 1991, McGuinness turned 50. To celebrate his birthday and to announce the release of a Manfred Mann compilation album, all original members (minus Manfred Mann) planned a reunion tour.[12] Mann was still touring with Manfred Mann's Earth Band, was unable to tour with them, so they went with The Manfreds instead.[13] With the original members came Mike d'Abo (who replaced Jones after he went solo), Benny Gallagher (of Gallagher and Lyle) and Rob Townsend (of Family).[14]

== See also ==
- List of bass guitarists
- List of British blues musicians
