= Back to the Pops =

Studio album by Glay
- Released: 9 October 2024
- Length: 65:49
- Label: Pony Canyon

Glay chronology
Freedom Only (2021)	Back to the Pops (2024)

Back to the Pops is the seventeenth studio album by Japanese rock band Glay, released on 9 October 2024 via Pony Canyon.

It features guest performances by Pierre Nakano (drums on tracks 1 and 12), Shinya Kiyozuka (piano on 12), Koharu (Charan-Po-Rantan, arrangement on 14), HIDE (GRe4N BOYZ, chorus on 14), and Ryota Yamasato (Nankai Candies, spoken words on 14).

To commemorate the album's release, a short drama titled GLAY Back to the Pops 'Albumovie', directed by Michihiko Yanai and starring Tokio Emoto and Emi Takei, was released.

== Background and production ==
According to guitarists Takuro (also main songwriter) and Hisashi, the album marks their "debut" for their 30th year as a band and it was conceived with GLAY's take on pop music from various angles. In interviews, both members stated that unlike more later albums, debut albums typically reflect the immediate concerns of young musicians, so the band deliberately focused on such topics instead of touching more "grown up" matters as they had been doing for the past decades. Takuro also said he feels "proud of the J-ROCK and J-POP I've listened to and created, and I feel a responsibility and mission to pass that on to the next generation".

Regarding the title Back to the Pops, vocalist Teru said it was more like a keyword between members to guide the songs. After three months trying to decide on a track order, the quartet simply did a draw, which can be seen in a bonus video. Takuro commented that such process would fit the age of streaming.

== Commercial reception ==
=== Oricon ===
In the Oricon Weekly Album Ranking, the album debuted at #1 with 25,773 copies sold in its first week. It marked GLAY's 17th album to reach the top spot. In the Digital Albums category, it also ranked first with 1,594 downloads in its debut week, becoming the band's second digital chart-topper. Furthermore, it topped the Combined Albums chart as well, with a total of 28,016 points, marking their third number one in this category.

=== Billboard Japan ===
On Billboard Japan's “Hot Albums” chart published on October 16, 2024 (tracking period: October 7–13), the album ranked first overall with 17,358 physical sales and 1,525 downloads. This marked their third time topping the chart, following Summerdelics (2017) and the compilation Review II: Best of GLAY (2020).

In the Billboard Japan Weekly Album Sales chart (Top Albums Sales), it also debuted at number one with 17,358 copies sold. This was GLAY's first number one on this chart in approximately four years and seven months, since Review II: Best of GLAY. As for original albums, it was their first number one since No Democracy (2019).

The album topped Billboard Japan's Download Albums chart (tracking period: October 7–13, 2024), with 1,525 downloads.

=== Other ===
On January 9, 2025, the album was selected in the "Red" category at the 17th CD Shop Awards 2025.

== Track listing ==
Back to the Pops track listing
No.	Title	Translation	Length
1.	"Romance Rose"		3:51
2.	"Buddy"		4:49
3.	"Shea (シェア)"	Share	4:51
4.	"Sayonara wa Yasashiku (さよならはやさしく)"	Farewell Is Gentle	4:42
5.	"Kaishin no Ichigeki (会心ノ一撃)"	A Critical Hit	3:46
6.	"Kaikyō no Machi nite (海峡の街にて)"	In the Strait Town	6:12
7.	"Brighten Up"		4:03
8.	"V."		2:55
9.	"Beautiful Like You"		6:07
10.	"whodunit"		4:28
11.	"Sono Koi wa Kirei na Katachi o Shiteinai (その恋は綺麗な形をしていない)"	That Love Doesn't Have a Beautiful Shape	4:29
12.	"Nante Yaban ni ECSTASY (なんて野蛮にECSTASY)"	How Savage, Ecstasy	5:56
13.	"Sharuro (シャルロ)"	Charlo	3:33
14.	"Back Home With Mrs.Snowman"		6:07
Total length:			65:49
