= Music Life =

Studio album by Glay
- Released: November 5, 2014
- Genres: Pop rock; power pop; progressive rock
- Labels: Loversoul Music & Associates; Pony Canyon
- Producers: Glay and Seiji Kameda

Glay chronology
| Justice/Guilty (2013) | Music Life (2014) | Summerdelics (2017) |

Music Life is the thirteenth studio album by Japanese pop rock band Glay, released on November 5, 2014.

== Album ==
The album was released in three different editions: one regular edition with the 11 new tracks, and two special editions, each containing a second CD, Ballads Best☆Melodies or Ballads Best☆Memories—the latter of which being exclusive to the band's online store, G-Direct—containing previously released ballads by the band. The track list of both compilations was decided by fan votes.

== Reception ==
The album reached #2 on the Oricon weekly charts, #5 on their monthly chart for November, and #58 on their 2014 Year-End Chart, as well as reaching #4 on the Billboard Japan Top Albums chart.

== Cover art ==
The cover art of the album was inspired by The Beatles' Revolver, and was designed by Klaus Voormann, Revolver's cover artist. Commenting on the cover, guitarist and main songwriter Takuro said:

We have walked this 'music life' along with our fans for 20 years since our 1994 major debut. This time we were able to play out our secret dream with all of your help. Klaus Voorman, who has greatly influenced modern art, has created a splendid album cover for Glay’s 20th anniversary album, 'Music Life'. I will never forget how I felt when I saw the first draft. I promise that Glay will continue to work hard in the future. Thank you to Klaus and everybody involved.

== In other media ==
The track "Hashire! Mirai" was used as the opening theme of the anime adaptation of Ace of Diamond. The track "Sakurabito", composed by Takuro upon request by the Fukushima Hamakaido Sakura Project, was included as the ending track of both compilations.

== Track listing ==
All tracks are written by Takuro, except where noted.

| No. | Title | Length |
|---|---|---|
| 1. | "Bleeze (album version)" (Teru) | 3:54 |
| 2. | "百花繚乱 (Hyakka Ryoran)" | 3:10 |
| 3. | "Only Yesterday" | 4:45 |
| 4. | "疾走れ！ミライ (Hashire! Mirai)" (Teru) | 4:01 |
| 5. | "祭りのあと (Matsuri no Ato)" | 4:16 |
| 6. | "浮気なKiss Me Girl (Uwaki na Kiss Me Girl)" | 3:11 |
| 7. | "妄想コレクター (Mousou Collector)" (Hisashi) | 5:05 |
| 8. | "Hospital pm9" | 5:20 |
| 9. | "Dark River" | 5:11 |
| 10. | "Till Kingdom Come" | 4:53 |
| 11. | "Music Life" (music by Jiro) | 5:12 |
| Total length: | | 48:58 |

All tracks are written by Takuro (writer of tracks 1, 8 and 12 is unknown).

Ballads Best☆Melodies
| No. | Title | Length |
|---|---|---|
| 1. | "つづれ織り〜so far and yet so close〜 (Tsuzureori~so far and yet so close~)" | 5:11 |
| 2. | "Beloved" | 4:45 |
| 3. | "Eternally" | 6:15 |
| 4. | "Pure Soul" | 6:28 |
| 5. | "However" | 5:35 |
| 6. | "都忘れ (Miyako Wasure)" | 5:02 |
| 7. | "Satellite of Love" | 5:31 |
| 8. | "春を愛する人 (Haru wo aisuru hito)" | 5:04 |
| 9. | "ずっと2人で... (Zutto Futari de...)" | 7:08 |
| 10. | "カーテンコール (Curtain Call)" | 5:34 |
| 11. | "Together" | 7:02 |
| 12. | "Let Me Be" | 6:22 |
| 13. | "Sorry Love" | 5:44 |
| 14. | "さくらびと (Sakurabito)" | 2:08 |

All tracks are written by Takuro (writer of track 11 is unknown).

Ballads Best☆Memories
| No. | Title | Length |
|---|---|---|
| 1. | "笑顔の多い日ばかりじゃない (Egao no Ooi hi ga Kari Janai)" | 5:37 |
| 2. | "カナリヤ (Canary)" | 6:52 |
| 3. | "軌跡の果て (Kiseki no Hate)" | 5:34 |
| 4. | "時の雫 (Toki no Shizuku)" | 7:24 |
| 5. | "時計 (Tokei)" | 4:24 |
| 6. | "Hello My Life" | 3:34 |
| 7. | "Precious" | 6:32 |
| 8. | "ホワイトロード (White Road)" | 5:17 |
| 9. | "Mirror" | 5:50 |
| 10. | "May Fair" | 4:58 |
| 11. | "ゆるぎない者達 (Yuruginai Monotachi)" | 5:10 |
| 12. | "Rosy" | 4:35 |
| 13. | "さくらびと (Sakurabito)" | 2:08 |
