= Freedom Only =

Studio album by Glay
- Released: 6 October 2021
- Length: 59:46
- Label: LSG

Glay chronology
No Democracy (2019)	Freedom Only (2021)	Back to the Pops (2024)

Singles from Freedom Only
- 1. "Shukusai" Released: 18 September 2021

Freedom Only is the sixteenth studio album by Japanese rock band Glay, released on 6 October 2021 via LSG.

The album feature 12 tracks in total, including previously released singles. The concept of the album was described as "a gentle sound with simplicity and high entertainment value that heals the heart" and it includes songs produced between 1997 and 2020.

According to guitarist Takuro, during the COVID-19 pandemic, he revisited old demos and reflected that the things they couldn't do or chose not to do at the time could now be achieved by the current Glay. Therefore, the album incorporates elements of artists they respected from the 1980s to 2000s, interpreted through a modern filter, resulting in a work rooted in their foundation of Japanese rock and pop.

The title was inspired by a line from the Carpenters song "I Need to Be in Love", reflecting the idea that "to be free, one must part with something". The album artwork was designed by King Gnu's Daiki Tsuneta, who leads the creative team PERIMETRON, a collaboration proposed by vocalist Teru. This visual concept also serves as the theme for the album promotional tour.

On 18 September, the single "Shukusai" was released digitally and on 24 September, its music video was released.

== Commercial reception ==
Freedom Only reached #2 at both the Billboard Japan Hot Albums chart and the Oricon weekly charts, staying on the latter for 17 weeks. In the end of the year, it reached #79 at the Billboard Japan Year End Top Albums Sales and #87 at Oricon's.

In the Oricon Weekly Album Chart (dated October 18, 2021), the album achieved 32,716 points in the combined category, 30,738 copies in the CD album category, and 1,576 downloads in the download category, taking the No. 1 spot in all of them.

In addition, it also ranked No. 1 in Billboard's Download Albums with 1,660 downloads.

== Track listing ==
All lyrics are written by Takuro; all music is composed by Takuro, except where noted; all songs are arranged by GLAY and Seiji Kameda, except where noted.

Freedom Only track listing, regular edition
No.	Title	Arranger(s)	Length
1.	"Betty Blue" (Takuro, Seiji Kameda)		5:18
2.	"Hypersonic"		4:08
3.	"Winter Moon Winter Stars"		4:32
4.	"Fried Green Tomatoes"		5:45
5.	"Eien o Nanoru Ichibyo"	Glay, Seiji Kameda, Jun Murayama	5:53
6.	"Tadayedo Shizumazu"		4:40
7.	"Bad Apple"	Glay, Tomi Yo, Seiji Kameda	5:16
8.	"Tiny Soldier"		3:52
9.	"Holy Knight" (Audio 2 Audio)	Glay, Yow-Row, Seiji Kameda	5:12
10.	"Seishun wa Zankoku da"		5:26
11.	"Shukusai"		4:57
12.	"Sakura Meguri"	Takuro	4:47
Total length:			59:46

=== CD (Disc2・G-Direct Gentei-Ban Nomi) ===
1. "DJ Mass Mad Izm* Remixes + DJ Mix"
2. "Natsune Skate Sonic EXP* Remix"
3. "Little Lovebirds [Teru:Vivid] Re-Work"
4. "Kanariya HKDT Laidback Remix"
5. "Hashire! Mirai HW Laidback Remix"
6. "Ryūsei No Howl Piano Beat Remix"
7. "Surf Rider Non-Fiction HSMS Remix"
8. "Kanojo Wa Zonbi HSMS 80/90 Remix"
9. "Synchronicity Cyberpunked Remix"
10. "All Standard Is You DJ Mass Mad Izm* Remix"
11. "Shikina Vivid Neon* Remix"
12. "Glay-Remixes 'Phase One' DJ Mix By DJ Mass Mad Izm*" (Faixa Bônus)

=== DVD (CD+DVD-Ban) ===
1. "GLAY Yagai Mukankyaku Raibu Vol.2"
2. "GLAY 'Freedom Talk' Kōhen"
3. "'Bad Apple' Album Ver. Music Video"
4. "Making Of Bad Apple"
5. "'Shukusai' Music Video"
6. "Making Of Shukusai"

=== Blu-ray Disc1 (G-DIRECT Gentei-Ban Nomi) ===
1. "'The Entertainment Strikes Back Sakigake Teruotoko-Tachi'"
2. "'The Entertainment Strikes Back Resonance Vol.3'"
3. "'The Entertainment Strikes Back Lifetime Music'"

=== Blu-ray Disc2 (G-DIRECT Gentei-Ban Nomi) ===
1. "'The Entertainment Strikes Back Live At Home Vol.6'"
2. "GLAY Yagai Mukankyaku Raibu Vol.2"
3. "GLAY 'Freedom Talk' Kanzen-Ban"
4. "'Shukusai' Music Video"
5. "Making Of Shukusai"
6. "'Bad Apple' Album Ver. Music Video"
7. "Making Of Bad Apple"
