= Straightener (band) =

Japanese rock band

- Straightener in 2026

Background information
- Origin: Tokyo, Japan
- Genres: Indie rock, alternative rock
- Years active: 1998–present
- Label: EMI Music Japan
- Members: Atsushi Horie; Shinpei Nakayama; Hidekazu Hinata; Jun Ōyama
- Website: http://www.straightener.net

Straightener (Japanese: ストレイテナー, Hepburn: Sutoreitenā) is a Japanese alternative rock band. The band started out as a duo with Atsushi Horie (vocals/guitar) and Shinpei Nakayama (drums) in 1998. They established an independent label named Ghost Records in 2002. Hidekazu Hinata joined the band as bassist in 2003, giving the band a heavier sound. In October of the same year they released a single, "Traveling Gargoyle" from Toshiba EMI.

Straightener have performed at numerous festivals and live tours. The band toured all over Japan during their Linear tour in 2007, as well as performing a joint tour in December 2013 with Asian Kung-Fu Generation to celebrate both bands' 10-year anniversaries. Both bands performed in Korea, Singapore, and Taiwan along with a local band from each country.

== Members ==
- Atsushi Horie – guitar, vocals, keyboards
  Also plays guitar and sings for the band FULLARMOR. Has a solo project called "ent", best known for the Solanin film soundtrack.
- Shinpei Nakayama – drums
  Also played drums for the band The Predators, with Sawao Yamanaka (guitar, The Pillows), and Jiro (bass, Glay). Drummer for the band another sunnyday and Zantö.
- Hidekazu Hinata – bass
  Former bassist of ART-SCHOOL and Zazen Boys. Also plays bass for the bands FULLARMOR and Nothing's Carved in Stone.
- Jun Ōyama - guitar
  Joined Straightener on October 1, 2008. Also plays guitar for another sunnyday. Former guitarist for the band ART-SCHOOL.

== Discography ==
=== Albums ===
Year	Album	Notes
2000	Straighten It Up	
2001	Error	
2002	Skeletonized	
2004	Lost World's Anthology	
2004	Rock End Roll	EP
2005	Title	
2005	Straightener Early Years	Compilation
2006	Dear Deadman	
2007	Linear	
2007	Immortal	EP
2009	Nexus	
2010	Creatures	
2011	Stout	Remix album
2011	Straightener	
2012	Soft	Remix album
2013	21st Century Rock Band	Compilation
2013	Resplendent	EP
2014	Behind the Scene	
2015	Behind the Tokyo	Live tour recording
2016	Cold Disc	
2017	Pause (Straightener Tribute Album)	Covers from guest artists
2018	Future Soundtrack	
2018	Best of U (Side Day)	Compilation
2018	Best of U (Side Night)	Compilation
2019	Blank Map	EP
2020	Applause	
2021	Crank Up	EP
2023	Four Piece	"Best of" compilation, as voted by fans from songs after Oyama joined the band
2024	The Ordinary Road	
2025	Next Chapter	EP
2026	DECADE EMO EP	EP. Celebrates 10 year anniversary of "Seaglass" single. Includes Blu-ray of live: Sad And Beautiful Symphony 2025.12.10 at LINE CUBE SHIBUYA

=== Singles/EPs ===
- "Senshi no Shikabane no March" (2000)
- "Another Dimensional" (2000)
- Silver Record (2002)
- Silent Film Soundtrack (2003)
- "Traveling Gargoyle" (2003)
- "Tender" (2004)
- "Killer Tune / Play the Star Guitar" (2004)
- "The Remains" (2005)
- "Melodic Storm" (2006)
- "Berserker Tune" (2006)
- "Six Day Wonder" (2007)
- "Train" (2007)
- "Little Miss Weekend" (2008)
- "Lightning" (2009)
- "Clone / Donkey Boogie Dodo" (2009) (The Shock Labyrinth Theme Song (CLONE))
- "Man-Like Creatures" (2010)
- "Vandalism / Silly Parade" (2011)
- "You and I / Hitsuji no Mure wa Oka o Noboru" (2011)
- "From Noon Till Dawn" (2012) (Yūsha Yoshihiko to Akuryou no Kagi Opening Theme)
- "Super Magical Illusion" (2014)
- "Winter Sun / The World Record" (2014)
- "The Place Has No Name" (2015) (Fuben na Benriya Opening Theme)
- "Inochi no Ato ni Saita Hana" (2015)
- "Day to Day" (2015)
- "Sea Glass" (2016)
- "Akari" (2017)
- "Boy Friend" (2018)
- "The Future Is Now / Time Leap" (2018) (Digimon ReArise Theme Song (The Future Is Now))
- "Braver" (2018) (Angolmois: Record of Mongol Invasion Opening Theme)
- "Spiral" (2019)
- "Graffiti" (2020)
- "Sakebu Hoshi" (2020)
- "Sayonara dake ga Oshiete Kureta" (2020)
- "Crank Up" (2021)
- "246" (2023)
- "Silver Lining" (2023)
- "Invisible" (2024)
- "Skeletonize!" (2024)

=== DVDs ===
- Black Star Luster (2005)
- Emotion Picture Soundtrack (2006)
- Remember Our Drinking Songs -Hello Dear Deadman Tour 2006 (2006)
- Linear Motor City (2007)
- Emotion Picture Soundtrack 2 (2009)
- Nexus Tour Final (2009)
- The Parade of Creatures (2010)
- Long Way to Nowhere Tour (2012)
- Eternal Rock Band: 21st Century Rock Band Tour 2013 (2014)
- Step Into My World Tour 2016 (2017)
- 21st Anniversary Rock Band (2019)
- Nana-Iro Electric Tour 2019 (2020) (with Ellegarden and Asian Kung-Fu Generation)

=== Split albums ===
- Dragorum with The Pete Best (2001)
- Untitled split cassette tape with Art-School (2002)
