= No Democracy =

Studio album by Glay
- Released: 2 October 2019
- Genre: Pop rock
- Length: 67:03 (regular edition)
- Label: Loversoul Music & Associates

Glay chronology
Summerdelics (2017)	No Democracy (2019)	Freedom Only (2021)

No Democracy is the fifteenth studio album by Japanese pop rock band Glay, released on 2 October 2019.

The album's details were announced on 17 August 2019 and it references the new Reiwa era of Japan established with the ascension of Naruhito to the Chrysanthemum Throne, replacing his father Akihito and ending the Heisei era. According to guitarist and leader Takuro, the title alludes to the fact that democracy is yet to be established around the world due to issues such as war and religious conflicts.

The album's bonus material includes live footage of their Glay Live Tour 2019 -Survival- tour which revisited their sixth album Heavy Gauge.

It reached #2 at both the Billboard Japan Hot Albums chart and the Oricon weekly charts, staying on the latter for 17 weeks. In the end of the year, it reached #79 at the Billboard Japan Year End Top Albums Sales and #87 at Oricon's.

The song "Kōri no Tsubasa" was used in the Japanese dub of the 2019 film Wings Over Everest. "Hajimeri no Uta" was featured as the opening theme of the anime Ace of Diamond Act II. "Colors" became the theme song of the film adaptation of the Final Fantasy XIV: Dad of Light series.

== Track listing ==
All tracks are written by Takuro, except where noted; credits for "Reiwademocracy" unknown; all songs arranged by Glay & Seiji Kameda

Regular edition
No.	Title	Lyrics	Music	Length
1.	"Reiwademocracy"			0:50
2.	"Hansei no Iro Nashi (反省ノ色ナシ)"		Jiro	4:43
3.	"My Name Is Datura"	Hisashi	Hisashi	6:27
4.	"Flowers Gone"			4:27
5.	"Kōri no Tsubasa (氷の翼)"			6:20
6.	"Daremoga Tokubetsudatta Koro (誰もが特別だった頃)"			5:13
7.	"Ah, mujou (あゝ、無常)"			4:06
8.	"Senka no Ko (戦禍の子)"			5:26
9.	"Just Fine"			5:02
10.	"Hajimeri no Uta (はじまりのうた)"	Teru	Teru	4:06
11.	"Anata to Ikite Yuku"			5:08
12.	"Colors"	Teru	Teru	4:17
13.	"Urei no Prisoner (愁いのPrisoner)"			4:49
14.	"Gengou (元号)"			4:59
Total length:				67:03

=== DVD and Blu-ray bonus tracks (Glay Live Tour 2019 -Survival-) ===
1. "JUST FINE"
2. "Young oh! oh!"
3. "HEAVY GAUGE"
4. "FATSOUNDS"
5. "SURVIVAL"
6. "ここではない、どこかへ"
7. "HAPPINESS"
8. "summer FM"
9. "LEVEL DEVIL"
10. "BE WITH YOU"
11. "Winter, again"
12. "Will Be King"
13. "生きがい"
14. "Savile Row ～サヴィル ロウ 3番地～"
15. "COLORS"
16. "はじまりのうた"
17. "愁いのPrisoner"
18. "元号"
19. "Missing You"
20. "SHUTTER SPEEDSのテーマ"
21. "彼女の"Modern...""
22. "誘惑"

=== Blu-ray Disc 2 bonus tracks ===
1. "ドキュメンタリー映像"
2. "あなたといきてゆく" (Music Video）
3. "愁いのPrisoner" (Music Video)
4. "YOUR SONG" (Music Video)
5. "JUST FINE" (Music Video)
6. "COLORS" (Music Video)
7. "元号" (Music Video)

=== Blu-ray Disc 3 bonus tracks ===
1. "GLAY SPECIAL LIVE ROPPONGI HILLS ARENA"（全曲）
2. "超プレミアムライブ GLAY × ゴールデンボンバー in 超音楽祭2019"（全曲）
3. "GLAY DAY JAPAN PREMIER LIVE in Chitose Powered by HOTEL GLAY" (全曲)
