= Guilty (Glay album) =

Studio album by Glay
- Released: January 23, 2013
- Genre: Pop rock, power pop
- Length: 50:51
- Label: Loversoul Music & Associates
- Producer: Glay and Masahide Sakuma

Glay chronology
Glay (2010)	Guilty (2013)	Music Life (2014)

Guilty is the twelfth studio album by Japanese pop rock band Glay, released simultaneously with Justice on January 23, 2013. It reached #2 at Oricon charts, behind Justice only—the same happening at Billboard Japan Top Albums - and #89 at their 2013 year-end chart. Both albums mark the second release of the band under their own label Loversoul Music & Associates.

The album was released in two formats: a regular edition containing the CD only, and a limited edition containing the CD and a DVD with a special program called RX-72 -Guilty Edition- (hosted by the band's lead guitarist Hisashi and Mogi Junichi). The program features episodes from the album recording and dialogue. There are also some tracks from their concert held at Zepp DiverCity on December 10, 2012. A similar DVD was released with Justice.

Clocking at just under eight minutes, "Red moon & Silver sun ~ My Private "Jealousy"" is their longest song to date.

== Track listing ==
All tracks are written by Takuro, except for "everKrack (album ver.)", written and composed by Hisashi

No.	Title	Length
1.	"Red moon & Silver sun ~ My Private "Jealousy""	7:55
2.	"everKrack (album ver.)"	4:14
3.	"Factory"	4:53
4.	"Fuyu no Yuhodou" (冬の遊歩道)	4:24
5.	"Hana yo Arashi yo" (華よ嵐よ)	4:30
6.	"Kiri no Naka (album ver.)" (キリノナカ)	4:29
7.	"Hatsukoi wo Utae" (初恋を唄え)	4:55
8.	"Bible"	4:28
9.	"Ruby's Blanket"	4:07
10.	"Kimi ni Aetara" (君にあえたら)	6:51

DVD features

1. RX-72 -Guilty Edition-
2. Footage from 2012.12.10 Zepp DiverCity
