= Each and Every Day =

1966 Manfred Mann song written by Mike Hugg

- US single label

Single by Manfred Mann

from the album Mighty Garvey!
- A-side: Semi-Detached, Suburban Mr. James" (US)
- Released: 7 October 1966
- Recorded: 22 August 1966
- Studio: Philips, London
- Genre: Blue-eyed soul; pop; R&B
- Length: 2:53
- Label: Mercury
- Songwriter: Mike Hugg
- Producer: Shel Talmy

Manfred Mann US singles chronology
"When Will I Be Loved" (1966)	"Each and Every Day" (1966)	"Ha! Ha! Said the Clown" (1967)

Audio
- "Each and Every Day" on YouTube

"Each and Every Day" (often recorded as "Day Time, Night Time") is a song written by British drummer Mike Hugg and recorded by his band Manfred Mann. Described as blue-eyed soul, R&B or pop, the song features keyboardist Manfred Mann on Mellotron. It was recorded at Philips Studios in London with producer Shel Talmy during August 1966. Though initially planned to be released as a single A-side, "Each and Every Day" first saw release as the B-side of "Semi-Detached, Suburban Mr. James" through Mercury Records in the US on 7 October 1966. "Each and Every Day" was belatedly issued as an album track in the UK through Fontana Records when it was part of the Mighty Garvey! album on 28 June 1968. Upon release, it received positive reviews, with critics noting the brass sound.

According to biographer Greg Russo, "Each and Every Day" became a popular cover song for other bands, who recorded it as "Day Time, Night Time". Early covers include one by the Mike Jones Group and the Shamrocks, whose version was produced by Manfred Mann manager Gerry Bron. British pop group Simon Dupree and the Big Sound recorded it as their third single in 1967 in a heavily promoted version which reached number 58 on the Record Retailer chart and received mixed reviews in the press. The most commercially successful rendition of "Day Time, Night Time" was recorded by British-born Canadian singer Keith Hampshire, whose version of it on A&M Records reached number five in Canada and number 51 on the Billboard Hot 100 in the US. His version received positive reviews in the press.

== Composition and recording ==
"Each and Every Day" was written by Manfred Mann's drummer Mike Hugg, with Bruce Eder of AllMusic believing 1966 to be the year Hugg established himself as a "highly successful songwriter" after having penned "Mister, You're a Better Man Than I" for the Yardbirds. Simon Matthews of Record Collector characterized the song as a "cousin" to his two later compositions "Sing Songs of Love" and "Up the Junction". With a runtime of 2:53, Eder stated that "Each and Every Day" was a "piece of pop R&B" similar to their single "Do Wah Diddy Diddy" (1964), and was similarly defined as pop by Mann biographer Greg Russo. Georgiy Starostin characterized "Each and Every Day" as a return to the "mine-trodden field of blue-eyed soul" for the band. "Each and Every Day" prominently features keyboardist Manfred Mann on his Mellotron, on which he plays the brass loop and other "horn effects". Eder further stated that because of the song's soul flavour, the "unified texture" and the "pounding beat" alongside the vocal performance was more central to the song "than any embellishments".

Produced by Shel Talmy at Philips Studios in Marble Arch, London, "Each and Every Day" was recorded during a marathon session on 22 August 1966 during which the songs "A Now and then Thing", "Acoustic Guitar Instrumental", "Another Kind of Music", "As Long as I Have Lovin'", "Autumn Leaves", "Each Other's Company", "Miss J.D.", "Morning After the Party", "Semi-Detached, Suburban Mr. James", "The Vicar's Daughter" and "You're My Girl" were also taped. An alternative take of "Each and Every Day" was recorded on 19 December 1966, but remained unissued. According to Talmy, the tracks were recorded onto four-track tape and was performed by the Manfred Mann lineup consisting of Hugg, Mann, Mike d'Abo, Tom McGuinness and Klaus Voormann.

== Release and reception ==
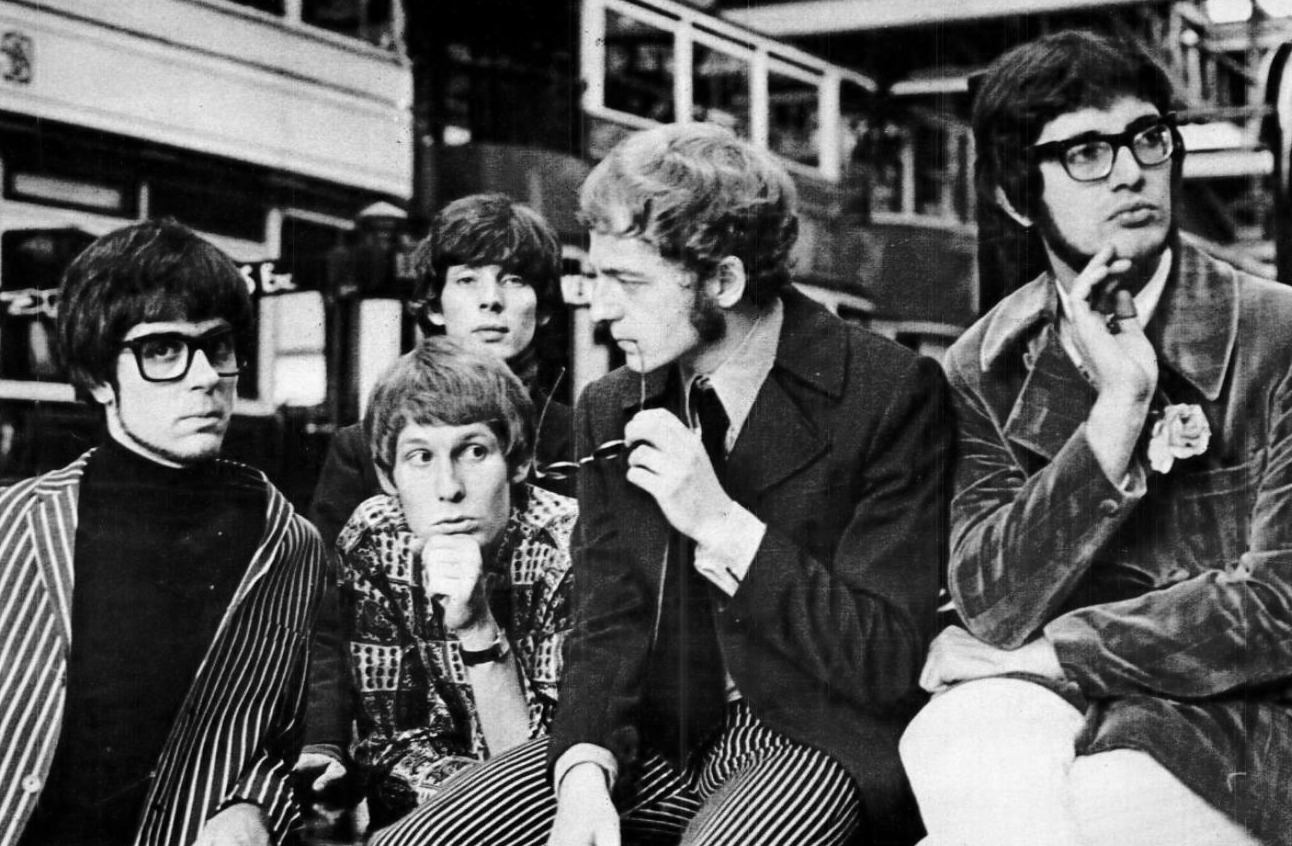
Manfred Mann in 1966, with Hugg second from right

According to McGuinness, the band had originally wanted to release "Each and Every Day" as an A-side single in the UK, a plan that was ultimately abandoned as they were both insecure about original compositions and Mann's hostility towards "homegrown material". Instead, "Each and Every Day" saw initial release as the B-side of "Semi-Detached, Suburban Mr. James" in the US through Mercury Records on 7 October 1966. (Note: Catalogue number Mercury 45 72629.) In the words of McGuiness, the song was big in Canada, but otherwise failed to reach the Billboard Hot 100. When "Semi-Detached, Suburban. Mr James" was issued in the UK, "Morning After the Party", one of Hugg's other compositions, was chosen as the B-side. Instead, "Each and Every Day" was first belatedly released in the UK by Fontana Records as part of the Mighty Garvey! album on 28 June 1968. It was also included on the US equivalent of that album, The Mighty Quinn.

"Each and Every Day" received positive reviews when it was released, with the staff panel of Cash Box magazine describing it as a "another star on its [Manfred Mann's] victory flag". They further examplified it as a "throbbing, husky, demanding track" which in turn backed the "intricate" and nuanced vocal work. In Record Mirror, Lon Goddard found "Each and Every Day" to carry tinges of both the Alan Price Set and the Small Faces, writing it to be characterized by its "brassy organ sound" and the vocal harmony which was "scattered here, there and everywhere". Allen Evans of the New Musical Express praised Hugg's performance, noting it as "strident". He otherwise noted the backing brass sound. In his review of the Mighty Quinn album, Dave Bist of The Gazette found both "Each and Every Day" and the title track to bear the "Mann-made stamp" which he opined was "a stamp of approval".

"Each and Every Day" also received critical acclaim retrospectively, with Russo believing it to be a "perfect pop song" and a "very memorable song". Andrew Sandoval remarked that "Each and Every Day" was an "exceptional" song which was "worthy of a better fate" than being relegated as the B-side of "Semi-Detached". Matthews believed it to be a tasteful piece of mid-1960s pop. Starostin suggested that "Each and Every Day" carried a "delicious and highly memorable" brass arrangement. Eder felt that the song, with its British Blue-eyed soul-style, was the "lost single" from the Mighty Quinn! album.

== Covers ==
=== Early covers ===
According to Russo, "Each and Every Day" became a popular cover tune, usually under the title "Day Time, Night Time". One of the earliest covers came from pop band the Mike Jones Group, who issued it as a single in 1967 which Cash Box described as a "groovy, dance-able rock item". Swedish pop band the Shamrocks recorded a cover of "Day Time, Night Time" on 24 April 1967 at the Regent Sound Studio in London, where Mann was present and lent his Mellotron for the band to use on the recording. Hugg specifically gifted the song to the Shamrocks. Their cover was produced by Gerry Bron, who was Manfred Mann's manager. "Day Time, Night Time" was released as a single on 5 May 1967 through Polydor Records' Karusell label in Sweden, with "Don't You Know She's Mine" co-composed by John Carter on the B-side. (Note: Catalogue number Karusell KFF 711.)

British pop group Simon Dupree and the Big Sound recorded a version of "Day Time, Night Time" at the EMI Studios on 8 April 1967 with David Paramor producing. According to Russo, Dupree's version was an "almost" note-for-note copy of Manfred Mann's original version. The Dupree version was issued as their third single in the UK through EMI's Parlophone label, also on 5 May 1967. (Note: Catalogue number Parlophone R5594.) Their version was supported by performances on Easy Beat and Saturday Club alongside a specifically made TV documentary about the band, but overall "didn't make much of an impression". Dupree's version of "Day Time, Night Time" reached number 58 on Record Retailer' "Bubbling Under" chart, but was more successful with the pirate radio stations, where it reached number ten on the Fab 40 chart published by Wonderful Radio London. It was Dupree's worst-selling singles released up until this point.

Writing for Disc and Music Echo, journalist Penny Valentine found "Day Time, Night Time" to have a striking production job and "lovely lurching brass". She found Dupree to be singing in "double quick time" and opined it would be a hit with the right amounts of plugging. Chris Welch of Melody Maker found the single to "sound ready for success", though quipped that it was not a "work of art" despite having "one or two inspiring moments" which "promised well for the future". Welch arraigned Dupree's vocal performance as undestinctive, even though his voice blended well with the brass arrangement. He ended by stating it to be a "well made record" though was unsure whether it would be a hit or not. For Derek Johnson of the New Musical Express, the song contained an explosive beat, a "big-belt vocal" and an "intriguing" backing track. Peter Jones of Record Mirror found the vocal line to be distinctive and the song "certainly commercial", praising it as "powerful stuff" which he commended. Biographer David Wells considered it a "wonderful interpretation" of the composition, which acted as a "musical taster" for their debut album Without Reservations.

=== Keith Hampshire version ===
"Day Time, Night Time"
- Japanese single sleeve

Single by Keith Hampshire

from the album The First Cut
- B-side: "Turned the Other Way"
- Released: October 1972
- Recorded: 1972
- Studio: RCA, Toronto
- Length: 3:06
- Label: A&M
- Songwriter: Mike Hugg
- Producer: Bill Misener

Keith Hampshire singles chronology
"Ebenezer" (1971)	"Day Time, Night Time" (1972)	"First Cut is the Deepest" (1973)

Audio
- "Daytime, Night Time" on YouTube

In 1972, "Day Time, Night Time" was recorded by England-born Canadian disc jockey Keith Hampshire. Hampshire had met producer Bill Misener in 1969, and together they recorded his first single "Ebenezer" for RCA Records in 1971. Though RCA declined to issue anymore material by Hampshire, he and Misener continued recording together at RCA's studios in Toronto. Hampshire was introduced to the song through the Dupree version by a friend of his during the autumn of 1972. "Day Time, Night Time" was cut by Hampshire, with Misener producing and George Semkiw present as an audio engineer. According to RPM, the session was "big" and featured both spectators and the Laurie Bower Singers on backing vocals. Hampshire was "certain" that "Day Time, Night Time" would become a hit, and signed a contract with A&M Records.

A&M released "Day Time, Night Time" as a single in Canada during October 1972. It was backed by "Turned the Other Way", which was written by Misener. On the RPM charts, "Day Time, Night Time" entered on 28 October 1972 at a position of number 77, before peaking at number five on 13 January 1973. It was the first of three consecutive Canadian top-ten singles Hampshire recorded. Hampshire embarked on a promotional campaign to promote the song in Canada, and A&M also released "Day Time, Night Time" as a single in the United States on 17 November 1972 as a direct result of its Canadian success. In the United States, "Day Time, Night Time" reached number 51 on the Billboard Hot 100, but fared the best on the chart published by Record World where it reached number 32.

The staff reviewer for Cashbox believed "Day Time, Night Time" to have a "great arrangement" which was only "bested an even greater vocal performance". They believed the single to stand a chance of reaching the national charts, stating "watch for this one".

==== Charts ====
Weekly chart performance for "Day Time, Night Time
Chart (1972–1973)	Peak position
Canada (RPM 100 Singles)	5
US Billboard Hot 100	51
US Cashbox Top 100	43
US Record World 100	32

== Personnel ==
Personnel according to Shel Talmy.

- Mike d'Abo – lead vocals
- Tom McGuinness – guitar
- Klaus Voormann – bass guitar
- Manfred Mann – piano, Mellotron
- Mike Hugg – drums
