= The Mighty Quinn =

The Mighty Quinn can refer to:

- "Quinn the Eskimo (Mighty Quinn)", a 1967 song by Bob Dylan, covered by Manfred Mann
  - The Mighty Quinn (album), the North American title of Manfred Mann's album Mighty Garvey!
- The Mighty Quinn (film), a 1989 film starring Denzel Washington
- The Mighty Quinn, the 2001 album by rapper San Quinn

== See also ==
- "Mighty" John Quinn (wrestler)
