= Summerdelics =

Studio album by Glay
- Released: July 12, 2017
- Genre: Pop rock
- Length: 62:41 (regular edition)
- Label: Pony Canyon
- Producers: Glay and Seiji Kameda

Glay chronology
Music Life (2014)	Summerdelics (2017)	No Democracy (2019)

Summerdelics is the fourteenth studio album by Japanese pop rock band Glay, released on July 12, 2017.

== Album versions ==
The album was released in three versions: the regular edition with the album, a special edition with the album and two live DVDs, and another special edition with the album, four live albums and three blue rays.

== Reception ==
It sold over 53,000 copies within less than a week, debuting at #1 both at the Oricon weekly charts and the Billboard Japan Top Albums Sales, staying in the former for 5 weeks and in the latter for 9. In the end of the year, it reached #51 at the Billboard Japan Top Albums Sales Year End 2017 and #58 at Oricon's.

== Songs used in other media ==
Several songs of the album were used way ahead of its release date in anime, TV series and sports events. "Deathtopia" was released as a single on August 3, 2016, and both the song and its b-side "Chou Onsoku Desutini" (which is also the album's fourth track) were used as the opening themes of the anime Kuromukuro. "Sora ga Aozora de Aru Tame ni" was also used as an opening theme for an anime: Ace of Diamond. " The Other End of the Globe" was used as the opening theme for Netflix's Final Fantasy XIV: Daddy of Light. "Scoop" was used as the ending theme of TV Asahi's Onegai! Ranking.

"XYZ" was composed for the TV commercial of the Chiba leg of the 2017 Red Bull Air Race World Championship. "Long Run" was used as the official song of the 2017 Hokkaido Marathon. Also, "Supernova Express 2017" is a new version of the previously released song "Supernova Express 2016", which was used as the image song of Hokkaido Railway Company's Hokkaido Shinkansen.

== Track listing ==
No.	Title	Lyrics	Music	Length
1.	"Sin Zombie (シン・ゾンビ)"	Hisashi	Hisashi	3:54
2.	"Binetsu Agirl Summer (微熱Ⓐgirlサマー)"	Hisashi	Hisashi	3:54
3.	"XYZ"	Takuro	Takuro	3:15
4.	"Chou Onsoku Destiny (超音速デスティニー)"	Hisashi	Hisashi	4:32
5.	"Long Run (ロングラン, Rongu Ran)"	Takuro	Takuro	5:25
6.	"The Other End of the Globe"	Teru, Takuro	Teru	4:46
7.	"Deathtopia (デストピア, Desutopia)"	Hisashi	Hisashi	3:59
8.	"Heroes"	Teru	Teru	4:14
9.	"Summerdelics"	Takuro	Jiro	4:10
10.	"Sora ga Aozora de Aru Tame ni (空が青空であるために)"	Teru	Teru	4:06
11.	"Scoop"	Takuro	Jiro	3:32
12.	"Seija no Inai Machi (聖者のいない町)"	Takuro	Takuro	6:42
13.	"Supernova Express 2017"	Takuro	Takuro	4:40
14.	"Lifetime"	Jiro	Jiro	5:32
Total length:				62:41
