= Klaus Voormann =

German musician and artist (born 1938)

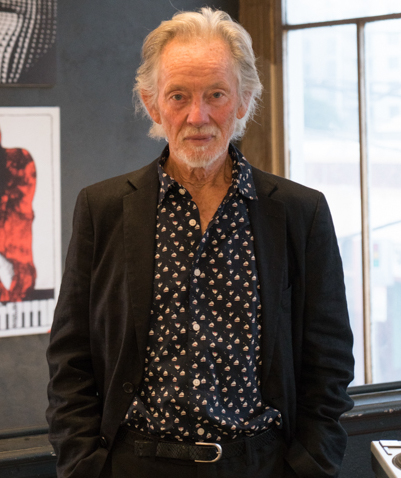
- Voormann in 2018

Background information
- Born: 29 April 1938 (age 88); Berlin, German Reich
- Origin: Hamburg, West Germany
- Genres: Rock and roll; rhythm and blues; psychedelic rock; progressive rock
- Occupations: Musician; record producer; graphic artist
- Instrument: Bass guitar
- Years active: 1960–present
- Labels: Apple; EMI; Fontana; Zapple; Epic; Sony; RCA Victor
- Formerly of: Paddy, Klaus & Gibson; Manfred Mann; John Lennon and The Plastic Ono Band
- Spouses: Christine Hargreaves (m. 1965; died 1984): Christina Harrison
- Website: voormann.com

Klaus Otto Wilhelm Voormann (born 29 April 1938) is a German artist, musician and record producer.

Voormann was the bassist for Manfred Mann from 1966 to 1969, and performed as a session musician playing bass guitar on a host of recordings, including "You're So Vain" by Carly Simon, Lou Reed's Transformer album, and on many recordings of the former members of the Beatles. As a producer, Voormann worked with the band Trio on their worldwide hit "Da Da Da".

Voormann's association with the Beatles dates back to their time in Hamburg in the early 1960s. He lived in the band's London flat with George Harrison and Ringo Starr after John Lennon and Paul McCartney moved out to live with their respective partners. He designed the cover of their 1966 album Revolver, for which he won a Grammy Award. He also designed the graphics for the sheet music of songs from Revolver. Following the band's split, rumours circulated of the formation of a group named the Ladders, consisting of Lennon, Harrison, Starr and Voormann. This failed to materialise; however, all four would-be Ladders (plus Billy Preston) performed on the Starr track "I'm the Greatest", and Voormann did play on solo albums by Lennon, Harrison and Starr, as well as briefly being a member of the Plastic Ono Band. In the 1990s, he designed the artwork for The Beatles Anthology albums.

In 2009, Voormann released his debut solo album A Sideman's Journey, which featured surviving Beatles McCartney and Starr, performing as "Voormann and Friends".

Voormann has designed artwork for many bands, including the Beatles, the Dirty Knobs, Harry Nilsson, the Bee Gees, Wet Wet Wet and Turbonegro.

== Early life ==
Klaus Otto Wilhelm Voormann was born in Berlin, Germany, and raised in the suburbs of north Berlin. His father was a physician and Klaus was one of six brothers. In an interview for Talking Germany, broadcast in July 2010, Voormann discussed his dyslexia.

The Voormann family were interested in art, classical music and books, with a feeling for history and tradition. His parents decided that instead of studying music, it would be best for Klaus to study commercial art in Berlin at the Meisterschule für Grafik und Buchgewerbe. He later moved to Hamburg to study at the Meisterschule für Gestaltung. However, before finishing his education in the graphic arts, Voormann started work as a commercial artist graphic designer and illustrator, spending eight months in Düsseldorf working for magazines.

== Association with the Beatles ==
It was in Hamburg that Voormann first met Astrid Kirchherr. One day, after an argument with her and Jürgen Vollmer, Voormann wandered down the Reeperbahn, in the St. Pauli district of Hamburg, and heard music coming from the Kaiserkeller club. He walked in on a performance by Rory Storm and the Hurricanes. The next group to play was the Beatles. Voormann was left "speechless" by the performances. He had never heard rock 'n' roll before, having previously only listened to traditional jazz, Nat King Cole, and the Platters. Voormann invited Kirchherr and Vollmer to watch the performances the next day. After they joined Voormann at a performance, the trio decided upon spending as much time as possible close to the group and immersing themselves in the music.

The St. Pauli district was a dangerous part of town, where illicit behaviour was commonplace. It was an area where prostitutes worked, and anyone who looked different from the usual clientele was at risk of violence. As a trio, Voormann, Kirchherr and Vollmer stood out in the Kaiserkeller, dressed in suede coats, wool sweaters, jeans and round-toed shoes, when most of the customers had greased-back Teddy boy hairstyles and wore black leather jackets and pointed boots. During a break, Voormann tried to talk (in faltering English) to Lennon, and pressed a crumpled record sleeve he had designed into Lennon's hands. Lennon took little interest, suggesting that he talk to Stu Sutcliffe, who Lennon said was "the artist 'round here".

Sutcliffe was fascinated by the trio, who he thought looked like "real bohemians". He later wrote that he could hardly take his eyes off them, and had wanted to talk to them during the next break, but they had already left the club. Sutcliffe managed to meet them eventually, and learned that all three had attended the Meisterschule für Mode, which was the Hamburg equivalent of the Liverpool art college that both Sutcliffe and Lennon had attended. Lennon dubbed the trio the Exies, as a joke about their affection for existentialism.

Voormann was in a relationship with Kirchherr at the time, and lived just around the corner from her parents' upper-class home in the Altona district of Hamburg. Kirchherr's bedroom, which was all in black, including the walls and furniture, was decorated especially for Voormann. After the visits to the Kaiserkeller, their relationship became purely platonic as Astrid started dating Sutcliffe, who was fascinated by her. Nevertheless, she always remained a close friend of Voormann.

In the early 1960s, Voormann decided to leave Germany and move to London. George Harrison invited him to live in the Green Street flat in London's Mayfair, formerly shared by all four members of the Beatles: Lennon had moved out to live with his wife Cynthia Lennon, and McCartney went to live in the attic of the home of the parents of his girlfriend Jane Asher. Voormann lived with Harrison and Ringo Starr for a time, before finding work as a commercial artist and renting an apartment of his own. He returned to Hamburg in 1963, where he founded a band called 'Paddy, Klaus & Gibson' with Paddy Chambers on guitar and vocals, Voormann on bass and vocals and Gibson Kemp on drums.

Voormann secretly married his first wife, Christine Hargreaves, an English actress, at Hampstead Register Office in London on 29 November 1965. The couple separated in 1971, after five years of marriage. While not legally separated, he moved out of their home to live at Olivia Arias and George Harrison's Friar Park in Henley-on-Thames, Oxfordshire. (Hargreaves died from a spontaneous brain haemorrhage at University College Hospital in Fitzrovia on 9 August 1984, aged 45. The couple were still married at the time of Hargreaves' death.)

In 1965, Voormann returned to London and was asked by Lennon to design the sleeve for the album Revolver. Voormann had a style of "scrapbook collage" art in mind. The cover went on to win the Grammy Award for Best Album Cover, Graphic Arts. Voormann later designed the cover art for Harrison's 1988 single "When We Was Fab", which included the image of Harrison from the cover of Revolver along with an updated drawing in the same style.

He was a member of Yoko Ono and Lennon's Plastic Ono Band, with Ono, Alan White and Eric Clapton, playing on their album Live Peace in Toronto 1969, recorded in Toronto on 13 September that year, prior to the break-up of the Beatles.

After the Beatles disbanded, there were rumours of them reforming as the Ladders, with Voormann on bass as a replacement for Paul McCartney, but the plan never materialised. This line-up (Voormann, Lennon, Harrison and Starr) did perform on Starr's 1973 song "I'm the Greatest". Voormann served as the three former Beatles' bassist of choice through the mid-1970s, playing on Lennon's albums John Lennon/Plastic Ono Band (1970), Imagine (1971), Some Time in New York City (1972), Walls and Bridges (1974) and Rock 'n' Roll (1975); Harrison's All Things Must Pass (1970), Living in the Material World (1973), Dark Horse (1974) and Extra Texture (Read All About It) (1975); and Starr's Ringo (1973), Goodnight Vienna (1974) and Ringo's Rotogravure (1976). In 1973, Voormann created the album sleeve and booklet artwork for Starr's album Ringo, on which he also played bass.

He played bass at Harrison's Concert for Bangladesh shows, at which Starr also appeared, in August 1971; Harrison introduced him to the audience by saying, "There's somebody on bass who many people have heard about, but they've never actually seen him – Klaus Voormann."

In 1971, Lennon told an interviewer that although the Beatles had disbanded, "if you'd said that George, Ringo and John had an idea they might play a live show or two, then Klaus would be our man to play with us."

== With Manfred Mann, and other work ==
Voormann designed the cover for the 1967 album Bee Gees 1st, which featured all five group members standing above a colourful, psychedelic collage painted by Voormann. The following year, artwork by Voormann graced the front cover of the American edition of the Bee Gees' album Idea.

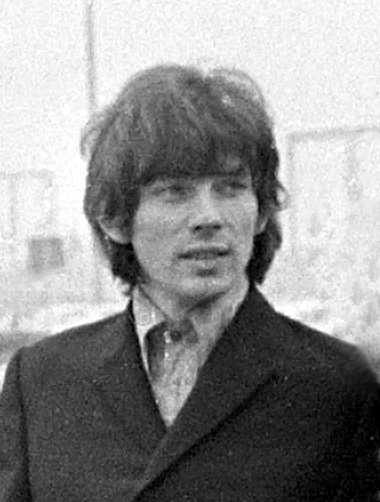
Voormann with Manfred Mann in 1967

In 1966, Voormann became a member of Manfred Mann, having turned down offers by the Hollies and the Moody Blues, although Voormann did substitute for Eric Haydock on a couple of television performances by the Hollies. Voormann mentions his negotiations with the group in his autobiography, Warum spielst Du Imagine nicht auf dem weißen Klavier, John? (Why Don't You Play "Imagine" on the White Piano, John?). Voormann played bass and flutes for Manfred Mann from 1966 to 1969, appearing on all their UK hits from "Just Like a Woman" (July 1966) to their final single "Ragamuffin Man" (April 1969) and including the 1968 international hit "The Mighty Quinn".

After that, Voormann moved to Los Angeles in 1971, and worked as a session musician. playing on solo projects by Lou Reed, Carly Simon, James Taylor and Harry Nilsson, among others. Voormann contributed bass to Joe Yamanaka's 1977 album To the New World.

== Return to Germany ==
In 1979, Voormann moved back to Germany; he had a cameo as Von Schnitzel the Conductor in the 1980 film adaptation of Popeye. He went on to produce three studio albums and a live album by the German band Trio, as well as their worldwide hit single "Da Da Da". After Trio broke up in 1986, Voormann produced the first solo album by their singer Stephan Remmler and played bass on some songs of the album. The following year, he produced a single by former Trio drummer Peter Behrens.

== After 1989 ==
Voormann retired from the music business in 1989, deciding to spend more time with his family. He lives at Lake Starnberg, near Munich with his second wife Christina Harrison and their two children, born in 1989 and 1991. From time to time, he appears on television programmes. In 1995, Voormann was asked by Apple Records to design the covers for The Beatles Anthology albums. He painted the covers along with his friend, fellow artist Alfons Kiefer. In the 1994 movie Backbeat, about the Hamburg days of the Beatles, Voormann was portrayed by German actor Kai Wiesinger. In 2000, Voormann also designed the cover for Me Rio, the debut album of Enja Records recording artist Azhar Kamal, which was influenced by his design for Revolver.

On 29 November 2002 Voormann played bass on the song "All Things Must Pass" at the Concert for George, held at London's Royal Albert Hall. In an interview with author Simon Leng, he described Harrison as not only a "really great guitarist" but "the best friend I ever had".

In April 2003 Voormann designed the cover of Scandinavian Leather for the Norwegian band Turbonegro. In October that same year, he published his autobiography, Warum spielst du Imagine nicht auf dem weißen Klavier, John? Erinnerungen an die Beatles und viele andere Freunde (Why Don't You Play "Imagine" on the White Piano, John?: Memories of the Beatles and Many Other Friends); the book gives special focus to the 1960s and 1970s, and covers Voormann's close friendship with the Beatles and other musicians and artists, as well as his private life. A BBC documentary, Stuart Sutcliffe: The Lost Beatle, broadcast in 2005, features interviews with Voormann and shows drawings he made of the Beatles in Hamburg. That year also saw the publication of his book Four Track Stories, which contains his experiences with the Beatles during the Hamburg days, stories narrated both in English and German, and pictures made by him. In 2007 he designed the sleeve for the album Timeless by Wet Wet Wet.

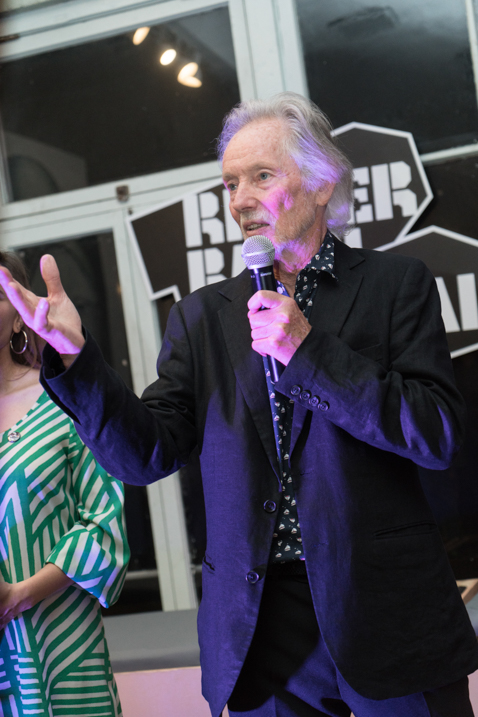
Voormann in 2018

On 7 July 2009, Voormann released his first solo album, A Sideman's Journey. It was credited to 'Voormann & Friends' and featured McCartney, Starr, Yusuf Islam (formerly known as Cat Stevens), Don Preston, Dr. John, The Manfreds, Jim Keltner, Van Dyke Parks, Joe Walsh and many others. The album has been available in a limited number of audio CDs, vinyl LPs, and deluxe box sets with original (and signed) graphics by Voormann; and included new versions of old songs such as "My Sweet Lord", "All Things Must Pass", "Blue Suede Shoes", "You're Sixteen" and Bob Dylan's "Quinn the Eskimo (The Mighty Quinn)". A bonus DVD of Making of a Sideman's Journey was released with the album.

On 30 June 2010, Franco-German television network ARTE released a 90-minute documentary entitled All You Need is Klaus, which featured footage from the 'Voormann & Friends' sessions, as well as interview footage with Voormann and some of the artists he had collaborated with in his storied career.

In 2014, Voormann designed the cover to the album Music Life by Japanese rock band Glay; the image depicting the face of each member of the band is strongly reminiscent of the cover to The Beatles' Revolver.

In 2016, Voormann created a graphic novel based on his experiences recording Revolver, calling it Revolver 50. Birth of an Icon. In 2017, he designed the artwork featured in the deluxe box set edition of As You Were, the debut solo album from Liam Gallagher. He also made a surreal pencil drawing of Mad magazine mascot Alfred E. Neuman for the publication's December 2017 issue.

Voormann designed the cover art and booklet sketch of the album ¡Spangled!, by Gaby Moreno and Van Dyke Parks, released in 2019.

In 2020, Voormann did the cover art for Wreckless Abandon, an album by Mike Campbell's band The Dirty Knobs.

== Discography ==
=== Singles ===
With Manfred Mann

- "Just Like a Woman" / "I Wanna Be Rich" (Fontana/Mercury/Philips) (1966)
- "When Will I Be Loved" / "Do You Have to Do That" (Capitol/United Artist) (1966)
- "Semi-Detached, Suburban Mr. James" / "Morning After the Party" (Fontana) (1966) UK
- "Semi-Detached, Suburban Mr. James" / "Each and Every Day" (Mercury/Philips) (1966) US/Australia
- "You're My Girl" / "Box Office Draw" (Fontana) (1967)
- "Ha! Ha! Said the Clown" / "Feeling So Good" (Fontana) (1967)
- "Sweet Pea" / "One Way" (Fontana) (1967)
- "So Long, Dad" / "Funniest Gig" (Fontana) (1967)
- "Mighty Quinn" / "By Request - Edith Garvey" (Fontana/Mercury) (1968)
- "(Theme From) Up the Junction" / "Sleepy Hollow" (Fontana/Mercury) (1968)
- "My Name is Jack" / "There is a Man" (Fontana/Mercury) (1968)
- "Fox on the Run" / "Too Many People" (Fontana/Mercury) (1968)
- "Ragamuffin Man" / "A 'B' Side" (Fontana/Mercury) (1969)

=== Albums ===
With Manfred Mann

- Pretty Flamingo (United Artist) (1966) US
- As Is (Fontana) (1966) UK
- Up the Junction (Fontana/Mercury) (1968) UK/US – movie soundtrack
- Mighty Garvey! (Fontana) (1968) UK
- The Mighty Quinn (Mercury) (1968) US

=== Collaborations ===
With Hoyt Axton

- Fearless (A&M Records, 1976)

With Badfinger

- Straight Up (Apple Records, 1971)

With Cate Brothers

- Cate Bros. (Asylum Records, 1975)

With Patti Dahlstrom

- Your Place or Mine (20th Century Records, 1975)

With Dion DiMucci

- Born to Be with You (Phil Spector Records, 1975)

With Donovan

- Slow Down World (Epic Records, 1976)

With Peter Frampton

- Wind of Change (A&M Records, 1972)

With Art Garfunkel

- Breakaway (Columbia Records, 1975)

With George Harrison

- All Things Must Pass (Apple Records, 1970)
- Living in the Material World (Apple Records, 1973)
- Dark Horse (Apple Records, 1974)
- Extra Texture (Read All About It) (Apple Records, 1975)

With B. B. King

- B.B. King in London (ABC Records, 1971)

With Nicolette Larson

- Nicolette (Warner Bros. Records, 1978)
- Radioland (Warner Bros. Records, 1981)

With John Lennon

- Plastic Ono Band (EMI London) 1970)
- Imagine (Apple Records, 1971)
- Some Time in New York City (1972)
- Walls and Bridges (Apple Records, 1974)
- Rock 'n' Roll (Apple Records, 1975)

With Jackie Lomax

- Is This What You Want? (Apple Records, 1969)

With Geoff Muldaur

- Motion (Reprise Records, 1976)

With Maria Muldaur

- Maria Muldaur (Reprise Records, 1973)

With Randy Newman

- Little Criminals (Reprise Records, 1977)

With Harry Nilsson

- Nilsson Schmilsson (RCA Victor, 1971)
- Son of Schmilsson (RCA Records, 1972)
- Pussy Cats (RCA Victor, 1974)
- Duit on Mon Dei (RCA Victor, 1975)
- Sandman (RCA Victor, 1976)
- ...That's the Way It Is (RCA Victor, 1976)
- Flash Harry (Mercury Records, 1980)

With Yoko Ono

- Fly (Apple Records, 1971)

With Van Dyke Parks

- Clang of the Yankee Reaper (Warner Bros. Records, 1975)

With Billy Preston

- Encouraging Words (Apple Records, 1970)

With Lou Reed

- Transformer (RCA Records, 1972)

With Martha Reeves

- Martha Reeves (MCA Records, 1974)

With Stephan Remmler

- Stephan Remmler (Mercury Records, 1986)
- Lotto (Mercury Records, 1988)
- Vamos (Mercury Records, 1993)

With Leon Russell

- Leon Russell (A&M Records, 1970)

With Carly Simon

- No Secrets (Elektra Records, 1972)
- Hotcakes (Elektra Records, 1974)
- Playing Possum (Elektra Records, 1975)
- Another Passenger (Elektra Records, 1976)

With Splinter

- The Place I Love (Dark Horse Records, 1974)

With Ringo Starr

- Ringo (Apple Records, 1973)
- Goodnight Vienna (Apple Records, 1974)
- Ringo's Rotogravure (Polydor Records, 1976)

With Loudon Wainwright III

- Unrequited (Columbia Records, 1975)

With Howlin' Wolf

- The London Howlin' Wolf Sessions (Chess Records, 1971)
