= Justice (Glay album) =

Studio album by Glay
- Released: January 23, 2013
- Genre: Pop rock, power pop
- Length: 42:05
- Label: Loversoul Music & Associates
- Producer: Glay

Glay chronology
Glay (2010)	Justice (2013)	Music Life (2014)

Justice is the twelfth studio album by Japanese pop rock band Glay, released simultaneously with Guilty on January 23, 2013. It reached #1 on Oricon charts, #86 at their 2013 year-end chart and #1 at the Billboard Japan Top Albums chart. Both albums mark the second release of the band under their own label "Loversoul Music & Associates".

The album was released in two formats: a regular edition containing the CD only, and a limited edition containing the CD and a DVD with a special program called RX-72 -Justice Edition- (hosted by the band's lead guitarist Hisashi and Mogi Junichi). The program features episodes from the album recording and dialogue. There are also some tracks from their concert held at Zepp DiverCity on December 10, 2012. A similar DVD was released with Guilty.

The track "Mahiru no Tsuki no Shizukesa ni" was used as the theme song for the movie Sogen no Isu.

== Track listing ==
No.	Title	Length
1.	"Who Killed My Diva"	3:29
2.	"Route 5 Bayshore Line (album ver.)"	3:41
3.	"Paradise Lost"	4:41
4.	"Love Impossible"	4:07
5.	"Mahiru no Tsuki no Shizukesa ni" (真昼の月の静けさに)	4:30
6.	"Gestalt"	2:11
7.	"Justice From Guilty (album ver.)"	4:38
8.	"Kizu Darake no Taiyou" (傷だらけの太陽)	4:52
9.	"Unmeiron" (運命論)	6:31
10.	"Smile"	3:23

DVD features

1. RX-72 -Justice Edition-
2. Footage from 2012.12.10 Zepp DiverCity
