= Semi-Detached, Suburban Mr. James =

1966 single by Manfred Mann

- Swedish picture sleeve

Single by Manfred Mann
- A-side: "Each and Every Day" (US)
- B-side: "Morning After the Party" (UK)
- Released: 21 October 1966
- Recorded: 22 August 1966
- Studio: Philips (London)
- Genre: Pop rock
- Length: 2:38
- Label: Fontana
- Songwriters: Geoff Stephens; John Carter
- Producer: Shel Talmy

Manfred Mann singles chronology
"Just Like A Woman" (1966)	"Semi-Detached, Suburban Mr. James" (1966)	"Ha! Ha! Said the Clown" (1967)

Audio
- "Semi-Detached, Suburban Mr. James" on YouTube

"Semi-Detached, Suburban Mr. James" (Note: The single has also been released with several different grammatical changes, lacking the hyphen and the comma on various international issues. A common myth for the single is that the name James was a substitute for the name Jones, which allegedly was a nod to the group's previous vocalist Paul Jones.) is a song written by songwriters Geoff Stephens and John Carter, recorded by English pop group Manfred Mann in 1966. Previous to this, it was recorded by the band Herbie's People who were signed to CBS and had recorded other John Carter songs. The original title was "Semi-Detached, Suburban Mr. Jones" and was recorded that way by Herbie's People. Their version was pulled by CBS when Manfred Mann said they would record it. It was subsequently issued but only in the USA on the Okeh label. Stephens and Carter, who were writers for a publishing company on Denmark Street, London, wrote the song in a style different from their usual compositions, as love was not the prevalent theme. Introduced to the song by producer Shel Talmy, Manfred Mann recorded it at Philips Studio in August 1966. Released by Fontana Records on 21 October 1966, the song was backed by drummer Mike Hugg's composition "Morning After The Party" as the group's second single on the label. Keyboardist Manfred Mann plays the Mellotron on the recording; it was one of the earliest recordings featuring the instrument. Following a trend set by Bob Dylan, the song tackles the subject of life in British middle class suburbia from the perspective of a narrator, who laments the loss of a lover after her marriage to another man.

Upon release, "Semi-Detached, Suburban Mr. James" received warm reviews in the British music press, but also received backlash from fans for its pop style. The song became a large success across Europe, reaching number two on the Record Retailer chart in the United Kingdom while peaking within the top 10 across the continent, Africa and Oceania. The song was not released as an A-side single in the United States because a competing group released their version there; instead it was relegated to the B-side of Hugg's song "Each and Every Day". Despite being released on the same day as their third studio album As Is, "Semi-Detached, Suburban Mr. James" was excluded from it. Retrospectively, the early use of the Mellotron and the production of Talmy have been praised.

== Background ==
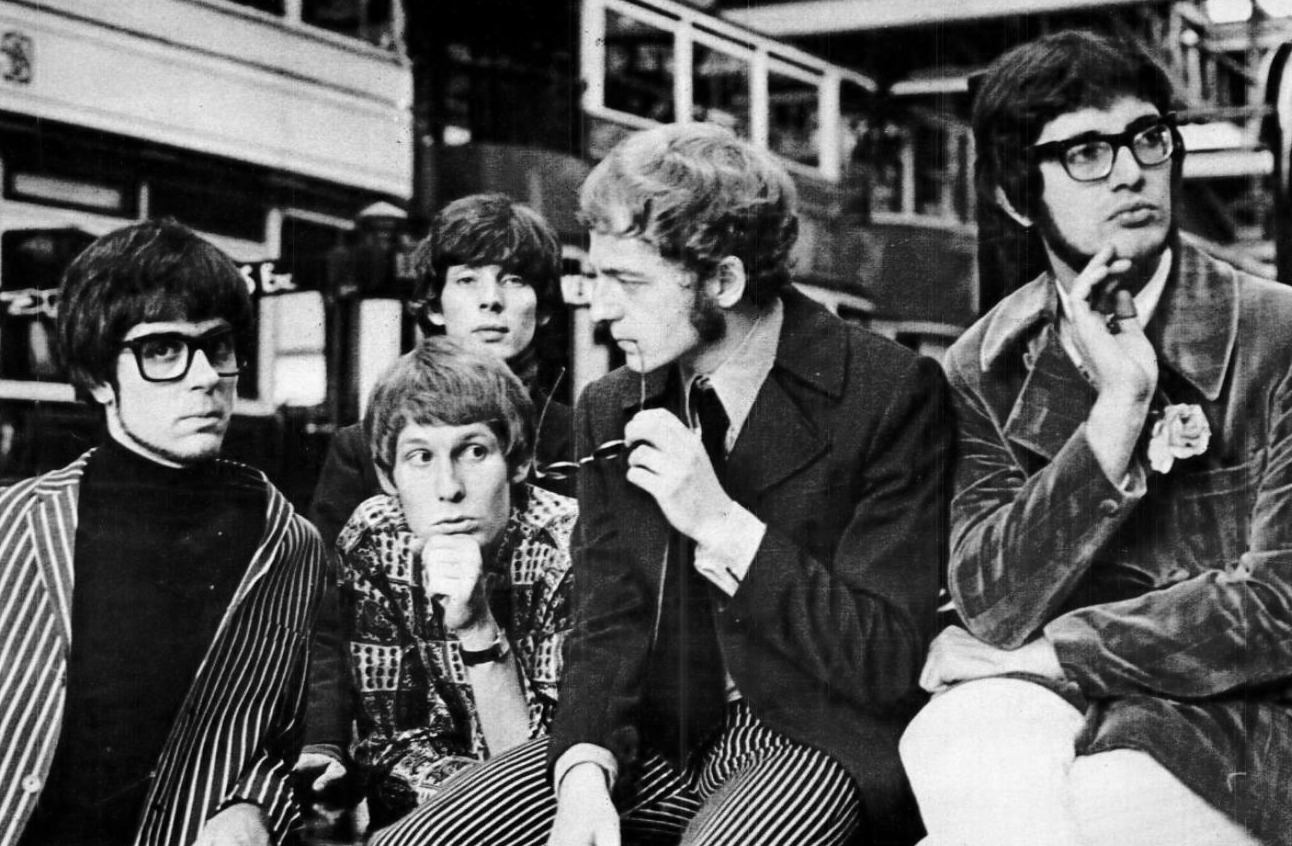
Manfred Mann in 1966

1966 was a tumultuous and relatively difficult year for Manfred Mann, due to several changes in their lineup. Their lead singer, Paul Jones had left the group shortly after their single "Pretty Flamingo" had reached number one on the Record Retailer chart. Jones was shortly followed by the departure of bassist Jack Bruce, after which Manfred Mann hired Mike d'Abo as a vocalist and Klaus Voormann as a bassist. After signing with Fontana Records, the band collaborated with Shel Talmy, an old acquaintance of theirs, which produced "Just Like a Woman". It reached number 10 on Record Retailer, which proved that Manfred Mann were able to keep their momentum and relevance following the departure of Jones and according to AllMusic's Bruce Eder, also established their "commercial credibility".

In search for new material to follow up "Just Like a Woman", the band initially had planned on covering another song by Bob Dylan, which generated some friction between band members, a number of which thought it would have been generic and formulaic. (Note: By this point, Manfred Mann had already recorded three Bob Dylan compositions; "If You Gotta Go, Go Now", "With God on Our Side" (both 1965) and "Just Like a Woman".) Instead, Talmy presented Manfred Mann with tapes from the Denmark Street publishing offices, where Geoff Stephens and John Carter wrote their music. Both Stephens and Carter were part of a niche group of English songwriters that "compared very favorably" to their American counterparts. For the song, the duo had embraced the conservative nature of Denmark Street rather than the youth subculture that was growing in London, meaning that it was more straightforward. Greg Russo states that the composition was rather unorthodox coming from them, as it was not primarily a love song which they had previously written.

== Recording and composition ==
"Semi-Detached, Suburban Mr. James" was the second of three singles that were produced by Shel Talmy, influential for his previous work with the Who and the Kinks, which Manfred Mann would gain experience from. In an interview for New Musical Express, lead vocalist d'Abo stated Talmy taught them "new and innovative techniques" in the studio, something that "our previous producer (John Burgess) [sic] didn't". He further said that the sessions were "a whole heap of fun". During the summer of 1966, Fontana Records had bought studio time at the Philips Studio in Marble Arch, which would further produce the album As Is (1966). "Semi-Detached" was recorded during a session held on 22 August 1966, which had also produced the bulk of the tracks which would make up As Is (1966).

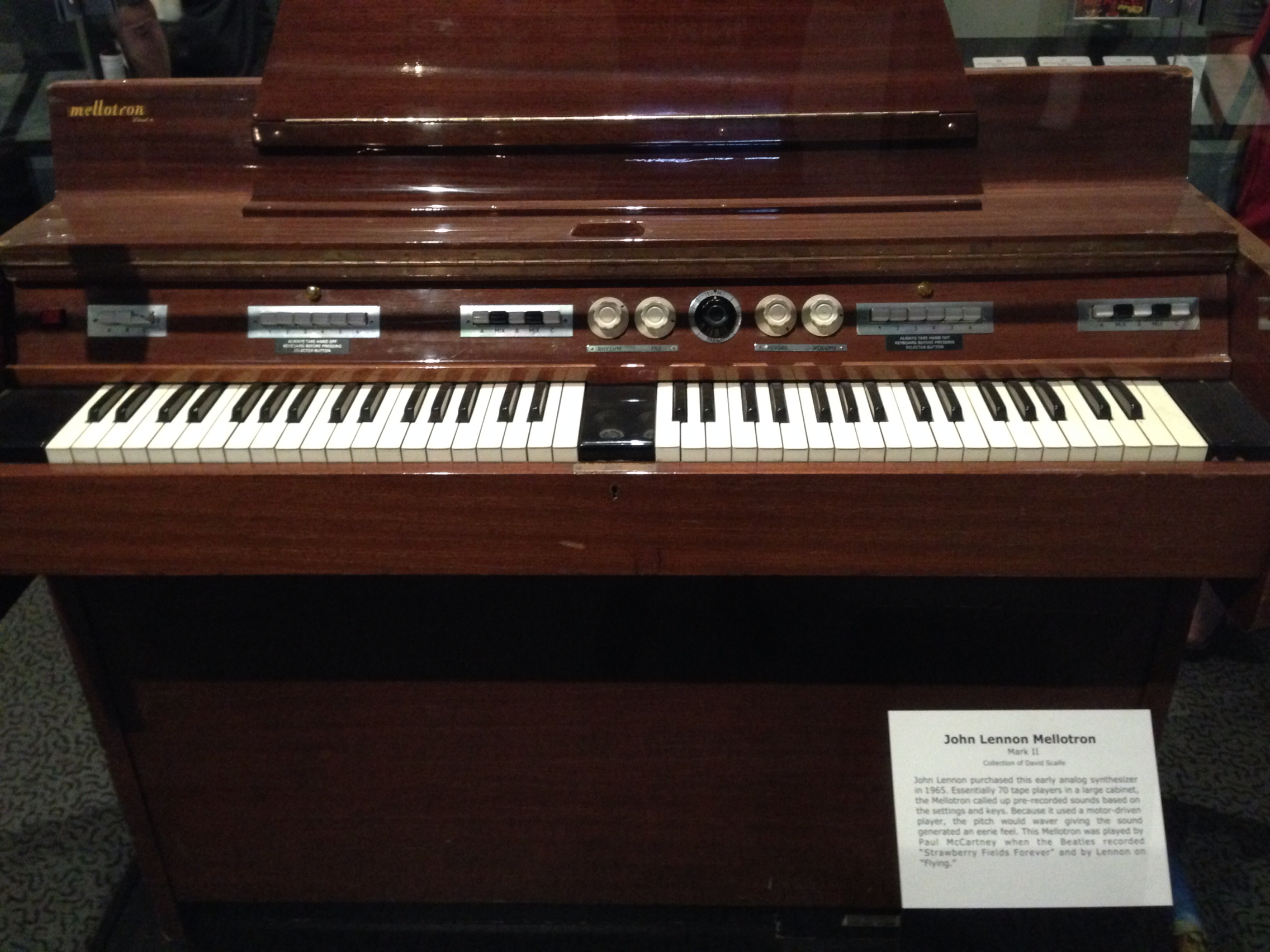
A Mellotron Mark II, the model keyboardist Manfred Mann plays on the recording.

The song is also noted in that it is one of the first pop recordings to use the Mellotron, an instrumental that would later become prevalent in the fledging progressive rock scene. On the instrument, keyboardist Manfred Mann plays loops using the flute setting during the intro, which then prevails in the composition after each chorus. The model of the instrument was the second iteration, the Mark II, which Mann himself owned. It was introduced to him by Mike Vickers, who previously was Manfred Mann's guitarist, and who would later similarly introduce the instrument to the Beatles. Mann claims that he took the inspiration to purchase one from his curiosity of instruments that were "new and exotic". The band would record another single using the instrument, the follow-up "Ha! Ha! Said the Clown" in 1967.

Lyrically, the track has become one of Stephens and Carters most discussed and analyzed songs. For the song, the duo drew inspiration from a recent trend in which social issues were brought up in pop song lyrics, inspired by Dylan. It tells the tale of British suburbia and a "wedding story" which Bob Stanley claims comes from "a jilted lover", which according to François Penz "didn't bring much hope to the suburban man either". However, some identify the song as satirical and dismissive of middle class life. This criticism is "couched up" when the narrator finds out that the lover has married. Russo states that the lyrics were, unlike previously more conventional love songs, rather "disturbing" from the perspective of the narrator. Roger Webster calls Manfred Mann's performance of the lyrics as "ironic".

Musically, "Semi-Detached, Suburban Mr. James" was largely written in the key of D major, which wasn't "unlike the writing of Stephens", who tended to write his songs in the major key. The single, largely based on the inclusion of the Mellotron, gave the song a relatively "baroque pop-fueled sound". Russo also believes that it was Manfred Mann's most straightforward pop rock due to the steel guitar played by group guitarist Tom McGuinness, whom he feels "makes an interesting and pleasant" contrast to the Mellotron backing. However, Kieron Tyler of The Arts Desk considered it "straight pop". Eder described it as a song that "marked a major departure for the group".

== Release and commercial performance ==
In the United Kingdom, "Semi-Detached, Suburban Mr. James" would be released on 21 October 1966 by Fontana Records as Manfred Mann's second single on that label. (Note: Catalogue number Fontana TF 757.) The release date coincided with the release of their third studio album, As Is, along with an unauthorized EP of older material by His Master's Voice, As Was. The single was backed by a group original, "Morning After The Party", which was written by drummer Mike Hugg. The song, featuring "strong Lovin' Spoonful-overtones" through the "cheesy, clinky piano", followed the standard by Manfred Mann of having an outside writer composing the A-side, while the group themselves would write the B-side. Unusually for a British invasion band at the time, the song was never released as an A-side in the United States nor Canada. The reason behind this was that another band, Herbie's People, had quickly recorded the song and were planning on releasing it as an A-side in the US. Instead, a then unreleased song by the band, "Each and Every Day", was released as a single in the US with "Semi-Detached, Suburban Mr. James" as the B-side. (Note: Catalogue number Mercury 72629. "Each and Every Day" would get a belated first release in the United Kingdom on the album Mighty Garvey!, released 28 June 1968, and was also included on the equivalent album in the United States, The Mighty Quinn, released 6 May 1968.)

The proof of the pudding and all that; we had a very big hit with 'Semi-Detached' and that means simply that the record buyers liked it.

— Manfred Mann, interview, Beat Instrumental

The song entered the Record Retailer chart on the week after it was released at number 32, before peaking at number two on 23 November 1966. The song was kept from the number-one spot by the Beach Boys "Good Vibrations", and exited the chart on 18 January 1967 at a position of number 42 after lasting for 12 weeks. In charts published by other British music publications it also charted high, reaching number two on the chart compiled by Melody Maker, while peaking at number three on both Disc and Music Echo's and New Musical Express charts. Across Europe, the single also reached the top ten in Denmark, where it peaked at number seven, and Sweden, where it reached number five on Tio i Topp and number ten on Kvällstoppen. The song also reached the top-10 in both Africa and Oceania.

Although released simultaneously with As Is, "Semi-Detached, Suburban Mr. James" was ultimately not included on it, even though the B-side "Morning After The Party" was. The song would not get an album release in the UK for almost four years until 1971, when it was released on the compilation album This Is... Manfred Mann. In Europe, the song would first get an album release on the compilation album One Way in 1967. Almost two years after release, the song would be issued on the group's final studio album in the US and Canada, The Mighty Quinn on 6 May 1968. According to author Greg Russo, the inclusion of "Semi-Detached" along with several other early tracks by the band "cements the album as a compilation" rather than a studio album.

== Reception and legacy ==
=== Contemporary reception ===
Upon release in the UK, the single was met with positive reviews in the press. Writing for Record Mirror, Norman Jopling and Peter Jones declare that "Semi-Detached" has the potential of being a big hit. They claim that the song is not written in the songwriters usual style in the lyrics. The two state that the melody "is catchy enough to take them to the top", and conclude by stating that it is different instrumentally with "moments of falsetto". In a review for New Musical Express, a reviewer erroneously claims the mellotron to be a flute, though notes that it "sounds beautiful". They state that the "tune is a commercial highlight" while adding that the record's chorus is "delightfully infectious". Another NME reviewer speculates over the chart possibilities for the song, which they claim will "either be too experimental for the charts or the perfect fit". They conclude by claiming it is one of Manfred Mann's best recordings. Writing for Disc and Music Echo, Penny Valentine states that the single is a "pop dream", with two "contrasting sides for the fans to dig". She ends by stating that it most likely will become a hit.

In the US, although being a B-side, Semi Detached, Suburban Mr. James" also received media coverage. In Cashbox magazine, the song is called "a very groovy ditty" by the staff." Russo claims that "Each and Every Day" was an inferior track to "Semi-Detached" and should've never been released as a single in the first place. However, he also claims that "Semi-Detached" might have not charted in the US regardless as Manfred Mann was in a state of commercial decline there.

However, Manfred Mann also garnered some criticism over the single, with some fans and critics deeming it "too poppy". Russo states that these claims were "nothing new" and the band had been receiving "bad media representation" since they started having hits on the UK charts in 1964. In music magazine Beat Instrumental, it is stated that the band received criticism over "sounding like a thousand other purveyors of typical pop music", to which Mann himself responded. New Musical Express reported that this backlash allegedly stems from how the "Manfreds music" was being played endlessly on pirate radio stations, including album tracks from As Is. One fan is cited as saying that their music is "too bland" and "too 'poppy'" while stating that the group needed to experiment in style with the Beatles. Russo believes these claims were justified, as he would have agreed that As Is was clustered with bland songs.

=== Legacy ===
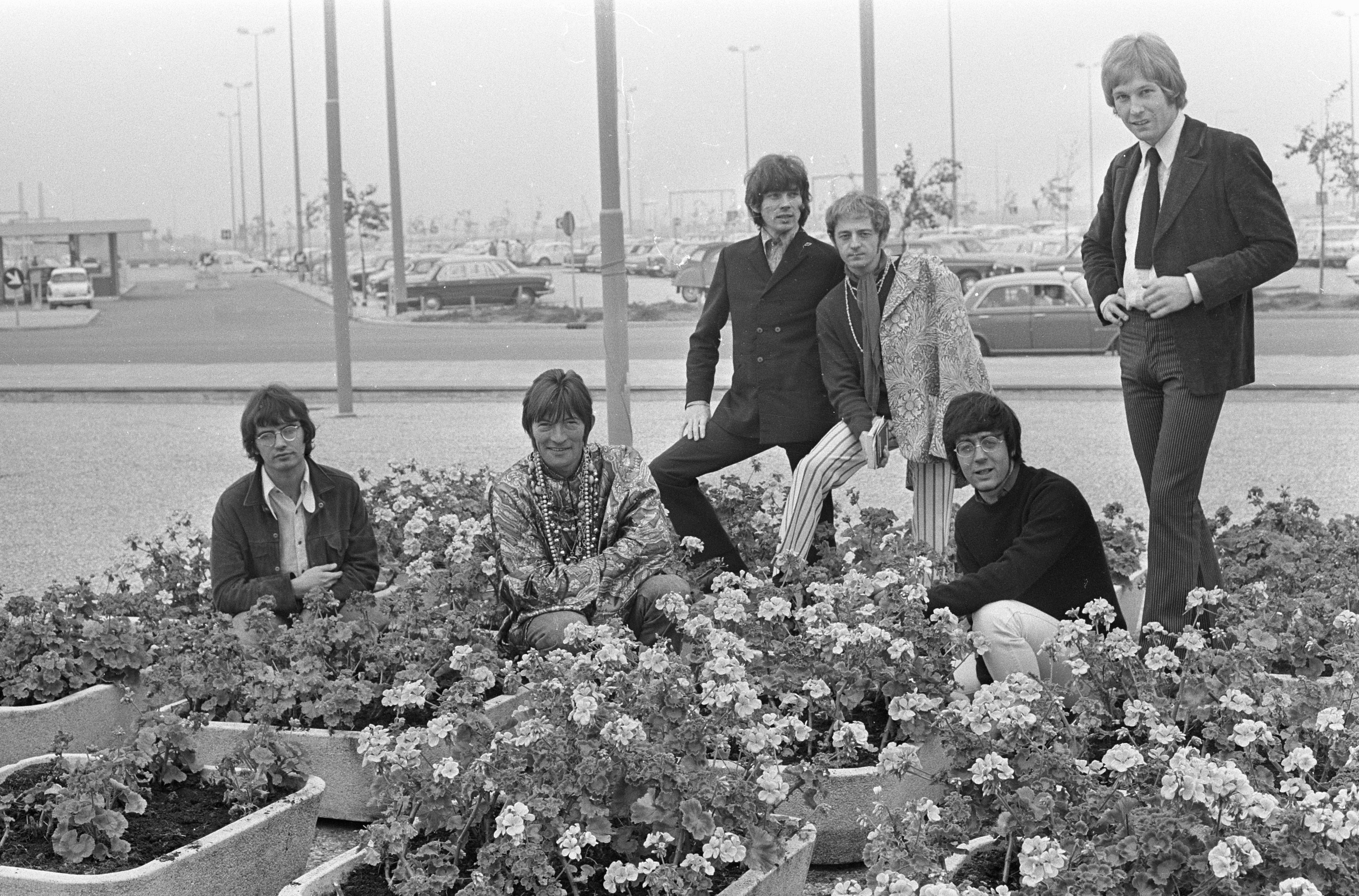
The band's pop image during the Mike d'Abo era can be attributed to "Semi-Detached, Suburban Mr. James"

"Semi-Detached, Suburban Mr. James" became one of Geoff Stephens' most well-known compositions after "Winchester Cathedral" Russo also claims it was his most "eclectic" song after "Winchester Cathedral". After the Mann recording became a hit, Eder claimed that Manfred Mann started reshaping their "sound and image". Russo states that they adapted to a new "era of Manfred Mann", where pop music was "first and foremost". He states that the band's success with their 1968 single "The Mighty Quinn" was almost entirely based on the success of "Semi-Detached, Suburban Mr. James". He claims that they would not have embraced the "pop-image the single had given them" in case it was not a hit, and most likely would have taken a different musical direction following its theoretical failure.

The production by Talmy has also been given praise. According to Alec Palao, the song showcased a "much more sophisticated production style" than all the group's previous singles, including "Just Like a Woman". The song's ending, which features heavily reverberated harmony vocals, could almost definitively be credited to Talmy. The use of the Mellotron on the song has also been noted. According to author Mark Cunningham, the single is almost entirely responsible for the influence and popularity of the instrument as it was the first commercially successful recording featuring it. Allegedly, the Beatles use of the instrument on their 1967 single "Strawberry Fields Forever" can also be credited to "Semi-Detached, Suburban Mr. James." as Cunningham believes "the Beatles would've never been introduced to the Mellotron without it".

== Personnel ==
Personnel taken from the book Please Please Me: Sixties British Pop, Inside Out, unless noted.

Manfred Mann

- Mike d'Abo – vocals
- Manfred Mann – keyboards, Mellotron Mark II, backing vocals
- Mike Hugg – drums
- Klaus Voormann – bass guitar, backing vocals
- Tom McGuinness – guitar, steel guitar, backing vocals

Other personnel

- Geoff Emerick – engineer
- Shel Talmy – producer

== Charts ==
Weekly chart performance for "Semi-Detached, Suburban Mr. James"
Chart (1966)	Peak position
Australia (Go-Set)	19
Australia (Kent Music Report)	32
Denmark (Danmarks Radio)	7
Finland (Suomen Virallinen)	5
France (IFOP)	65
Ireland (IRMA)	5
Netherlands (Dutch Top 40)	21
Netherlands (Single Top 100)	18
New Zealand (Listener)	3
Rhodesia (Lyons Maid)	1
South Africa (Springbok Radio)	11
Sweden (Kvällstoppen)	10
Sweden (Tio i Topp)	5
UK (Disc and Music Echo)	3
UK (Melody Maker)	2
UK (New Musical Express)	3
UK (Record Retailer)	2
West Germany (GfK)	16

== Notes and references ==
Notes

=== Sources ===
- Altham, Keith (1966). "Semi-Detached Mike d'Abo". New Musical Express (4 November 1966).
- Bacon, Tony (19 February 2019). "The Origins of the Mellotron: "The Sounds of Life" at Your Fingers". Reverb.com.

"The Manfred Minus Vocals" (PDF). Beat Instrumental (December 1966).

- Brown, Tony (2000). The Complete Book of the British Charts. Omnibus Press. ISBN 0-7119-7670-8.
- Clapton, Eric (2007). Clapton: The Autobiography. New York City: Broadway Books. ISBN 978-0-385-51851-2.
- Cunningham, Mark (1996). Good Vibrations: A History of Record Production. Castle Communications. ISBN 9781860741449.
- "Salgshitlisterne Top 20 - Uge 48 1966". Danske Hitlister. 1966-11-28. Archived from the original on 2016-04-14.
- "Disc Top 50" (PDF). Disc and Music Echo (19 November 1966).
- Eder, Bruce (2014). "Manfred Mann Biography by Bruce Eder". AllMusic.
- Eder, Bruce (2015). "Michael d'Abo Biography by Bruce Eder". AllMusic.
- "Geoff Stephens obituary". The Sunday Times. 14 January 2021.
- Hallberg, Eric; Henningsson, Ulf (1998). Eric Hallberg, Ulf Henningsson presenterar Tio i topp med de utslagna på försök: 1961–74. Premium Publishing. ISBN 919727125X.
- Hallberg, Eric (1993). Eric Hallberg presenterar Kvällstoppen i P3: Sveriges Radios topplista över veckans 20 mest sålda skivor. Drift Musik. ISBN 9163021404.'
- Kimberley, C (2000). Zimbabwe: Singles Chart Book.
- Tyler, Kieron (21 May 2017). "Reissue CDs Weekly: Shel Talmy". The Arts Desk.
- "New biggie for Manfred". New Musical Express (22 October 1966).
- Jopling, Norman; Jones, Peter (1966). "This week's biggies" (PDF). Record Mirror (21 October 1966).
- "NME Top 30" (PDF). New Musical Express (18 November 1966).
- Nyman, Jake (2005). Suomi soi 4: Suuri suomalainen listakirja (in Finnish) (1st ed.). Helsinki: Tammi. ISBN 951-31-2503-3.
- MacKenzie, C. (1966). "Fontana Records". Gramophone. 44.
- McGuinness, Tom (1997). Manfred Mann - The Fontana Years (CD). Spectrum Music. 552 375-2.
- "Melody Pop 50". Melody Maker (19 November 1966).
- Palao, Alec (2017). Making Time - A Shel Talmy Production (CD). Ace Records. CDCHD 1497.
- Ogden, John (15 November 2011). "Danny Cannon and The Ramrods playing farewell gig". Express & Star.
- Penz, François (2017). Cinematic Aided Design: An Everyday Life Approach to Architecture. Routledge. ISBN 9781317526629.
- "Record Reviews" (PDF). Cash Box (22 October 1966).
- Russo, Greg (2011). Mannerisms: The Five Phases of Manfred Mann. Crossfire Publications. ISBN 9780979184529.
- Smith, Alan (1966). "Radio listeners tired of the Manfreds?". New Musical Express (10 December 1966).
- Stanley, Bob (2014). Yeah! Yeah! Yeah!: The Story of Pop Music from Bill Haley to Beyoncé. W. W. Norton & Company. ISBN 9780393242706.
- Storry, Mike; Childs, Peter (2002). British Cultural Identities. Psychology Press. ISBN 9780415278614.
- Thompson, Andy (1999). "Manfred Mann". Planet Mellotron.
- Thompson, Gordon (2008). Please Please Me: Sixties British Pop, Inside Out. Oxford University Press. ISBN 9780195333183.
- Tobler, John (1992). NME Rock 'N' Roll Years (first ed.). London: Reed International Books Ltd. p. 160. ISBN 9780600576020.
- Valentine, Penny (1966). "Penny spins the discs". Disc and Music Echo (22 October 1966).
- Webster, Roger (2001). Expanding Suburbia: Reviewing Suburban Narratives. Berghahn Books. ISBN 9781800735149.
