= The Predators (Japanese band) =

Japanese rock band

- Origin: Japan
- Genres: Alternative rock; power pop; hard rock
- Years active: 2005–present
- Labels: Three Mountain, Avex Trax, Delicious/Pony Canyon
- Members: Sawao Yamanaka; Yoshihito "Jiro" Wayama; Hirotaka Takahashi
- Past members: Shinpei Nakayama
- Website: www.thepredators.net

The Predators (typeset as THE PREDATORS) is a Japanese rock supergroup formed in 2005 by vocalist and guitarist Sawao Yamanaka (The Pillows), bassist Yoshihito "Jiro" Wayama (Glay), and drummer Shinpei Nakayama (Straightener). In 2010, Nakayama left and was replaced by Hirotaka Takahashi (Ellegarden). Originally on their own record label Three Mountain, name chosen because all three original members have the word "yama" (mountain) in their last name, they were then on Avex Trax from 2008 until 2015, when they switched to Yamanaka's own Delicious Label. The Predators have sporadic periods of activity due to its members' commitments to their main bands.

== History ==
Glay bassist Jiro became a fan of The Pillows during the Runners High tour in 1999 and became friends with their vocalist and guitarist Sawao Yamanaka. In 2001, the two Hokkaido natives did a cover session of Nirvana together. In 2004, Jiro participated in the recording of The Pillows' 15th anniversary tribute album Synchronized Rockers, where he met Straightener drummer Shinpei Nakayama, saw his drumming style and thought he was talented. And so when the chance came, Jiro and Sawao asked Shinpei if he wanted to form a band together. The formation of The Predators was officially announced in May 2005. Their debut mini-album Hunting!!! was released on July 6, and reached number 12 on the Oricon Albums Chart. The trio had their first concert at FM802 Meet the World Beat 2005 on July 24. After participating in more festivals, the band went on sabbatical as the members continued their main bands' activities.

In 2007, the Predators returned with a performance at Sound Shooter Vol. 2 on March 9. On October 15, 2008, they released their second mini-album Kiba wo Misero, which debuted at number 6 on the Oricon chart. They held the six-date Shoot the Moon tour in October and November to support the record. In March 2010, the band announced the amicable departure of Shinpei so he could focus on Straightener. Shinpei had asked to leave the group during the 2008 Shoot the Moon Tour, explaining that although he wanted to continue both bands, the stress was outweighing the joy. He was replaced by Ellegarden drummer Hirotaka Takahashi, whom Yamanaka asked to join after working together on his solo album. The first concert with the new lineup took place at Arabaki Rock Fest. on May 1, 2010. On August 4, the band released its third mini-album This World, which peaked at number 12 on the Oricon chart. It was supported by a four-date tour in September.

After another break, The Predators released the mini-album Monster in My Head on August 1, 2012, and supported it with a nationwide tour from September to October. Their fifth album Rock'N'Roll Pandemic followed three years later on August 26, 2015, and was also supported by a nationwide tour from September to October. The trio resumed activities in January 2018 with the release of "Arabian Dance", a single featuring four studio songs and five live tracks that was sold only through mail-order and at venues on its accompanying tour. Three and a half years later, the album Go Back to Yesterday! was released only through mail-order on November 17, 2021.

== Members ==
- Sawao Yamanaka (山中さわお) – vocals, guitar (The Pillows) (2005–present)
- Yoshihito "Jiro" Wayama (和山 義仁) – bass (Glay) (2005–present)
- Hirotaka Takahashi (高橋宏貴) – drums (Ellegarden, Scars Borough) (2010–present)

=== Former members ===
- Shinpei Nakayama (ナカヤマシンペイ) – drums (Straightener) (2005–2010)

== Discography ==
- Hunting!!! (July 6, 2005), Oricon Albums Chart Peak Position: #12
- Kiba wo Misero (牙をみせろ; October 15, 2008) #6
- This World (August 4, 2010) #12
- Monster in My Head (August 1, 2012) #10
- Rock'N'Roll Pandemic (August 26, 2015) #12
- "Arabian Dance" (January 10, 2018, mail-order and concert venue only)
- Go Back to Yesterday! (November 17, 2021, mail-order only)

== Videography ==
- Shoot the Moon Tour 2008.11.4 at Zepp Tokyo (February 4, 2009)
- This World Tour 2010.9.17 at Zepp Tokyo (January 26, 2011)
- "Monster in Your Head" 2012.10.12 at Zepp Tokyo (January 26, 2011)
- Rock'N'Roll Pandemic Tour 2015.10.9 at Zepp Tokyo (March 2, 2016)
- The Predators Arabian Dance Tour 2018.2.8 at Zepp DiverCity Tokyo (April 25, 2018)
