= Ha! Ha! Said the Clown =

Song by Manfred Mann, 1967

- UK picture sleeve

Single by Manfred Mann

from the album Mighty Garvey!
- B-side: "Feeling So Good"
- Released: 24 March 1967
- Recorded: 10 February 1967
- Studio: Philips (London)
- Genre: Pop rock
- Length: 2:25
- Label: Fontana
- Songwriter: Tony Hazzard
- Producer: Shel Talmy

Manfred Mann singles chronology
"Semi-Detached, Suburban Mr. James" (1966)	"Ha! Ha! Said the Clown" (1967)	"Sweet Pea" (1967)

Official audio
- "Ha! Ha! Said the Clown" on YouTube

"Ha! Ha! Said the Clown" is a song written by Tony Hazzard, first recorded by British pop group Manfred Mann. Hazzard claims the song "came out of the blue", though he did not demo it for weeks. After he had recorded a demo, he approached manager Gerry Bron, who liked it enough to want one of his groups, Manfred Mann, to record it. Manfred Mann recorded their version of the single on 10 February 1967 at Philips Studio in Marble Arch, London, together with producer Shel Talmy. It was the second of three singles Manfred Mann recorded to feature the Mellotron.

Upon release by Fontana Records on 24 March 1967, the single received mixed reviews by critics, who deemed it inferior to their previous single "Semi-Detached, Suburban Mr. James", and criticized its lightweight pop sound. Despite these critical setbacks it became a huge commercial success, reaching number 4 in the UK and number one in several other European, African and Oceanian countries. Given that it failed to chart in the United States, Mickie Most released a version by the Yardbirds there, which became a minor hit for them.

== Background and recording ==
Manfred Mann had suffered problems during 1966, losing their lead singer Paul Jones and undergoing other line-up changes. However, they enjoyed a number-one single with "Pretty Flamingo", so their commercial success was not declining. After securing a line-up featuring vocalist Mike D'Abo and bassist Klaus Voormann, they signed with Fontana Records in June of that year. After their cover of Bob Dylan's "Just Like a Woman" reached the top ten, it established their "commercial credibility" according to Bruce Eder of AllMusic. Following the success of their second single on Fontana, October 1966's "Semi-Detached, Suburban Mr. James", the group began to "reshape their sound and image" to incorporate a more "pop-sound" into their music. However, both these tracks were written by outside writers, something which was standard for Manfred Mann. This led the group to look for new material from outside writers following the success of "Semi-Detached".

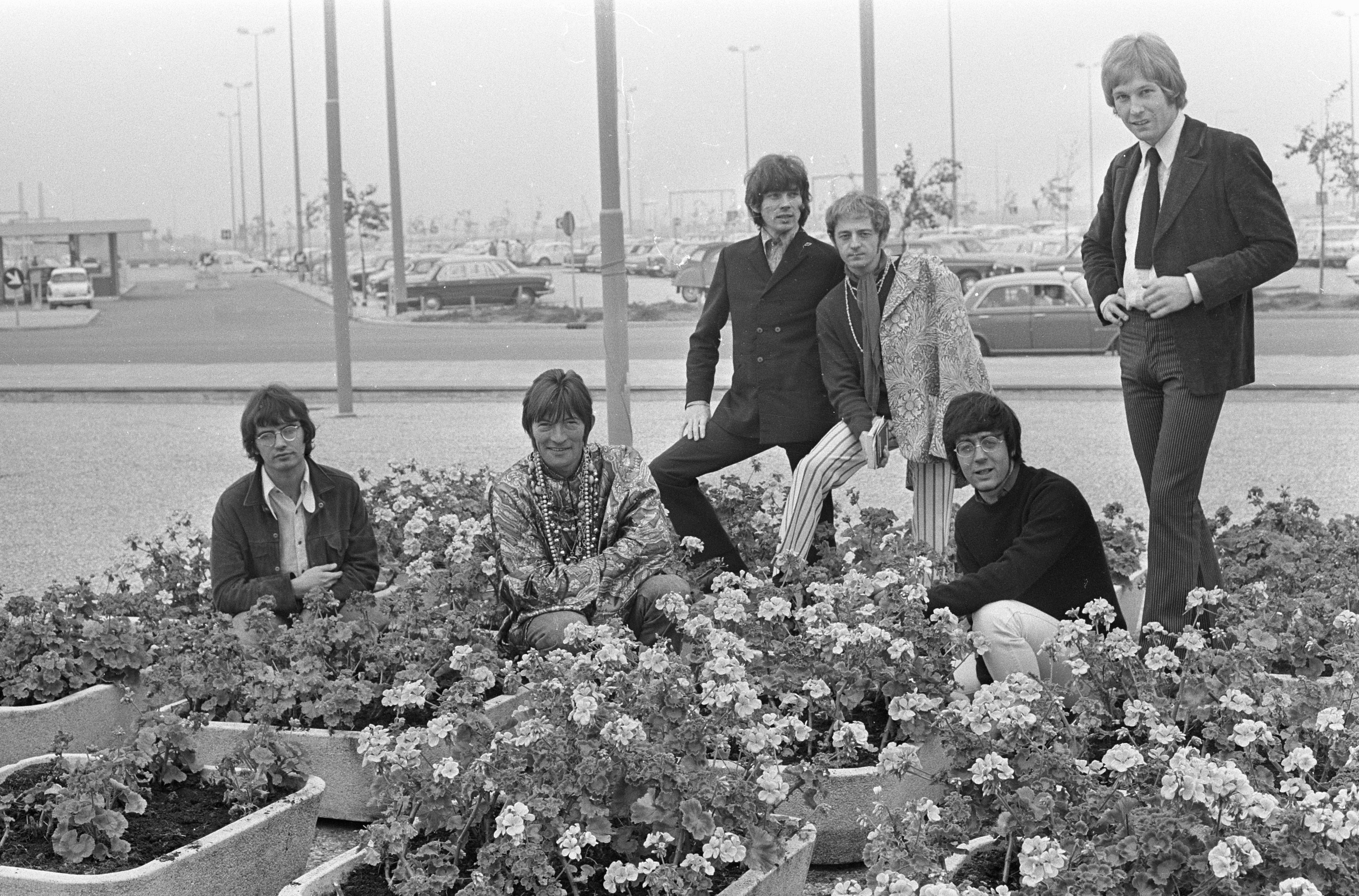
Manfred Mann with Dave Berry in 1967

In the May 1967 issue of Beat Instrumental, Tony Hazzard claims to have found "Ha! Ha! Said the Clown" in his head "out of the blue" but states that it took him weeks to finally record a demo of it. Peter Dunbavan states that Hazzard then entered the offices of Manfred Mann's manager Gerry Bron, who had signed him in 1966. There, Hazzard played three demo recordings for Bron, who deemed them uncommercial. Following this, Hazzard became reluctant to play the fourth song he'd demoed, "Ha! Ha! Said the Clown", though at the insistence of Bron he did so. Bron liked the song well enough to almost demand Manfred Mann to record the song. Manfred Mann himself, however, was not keen on recording it:

We would have got a demo. I remember it very clearly, it was from Tony Hazzard and I didn't like the song at all and didn't want to do it. But Lillian Bron (then wife of manager Gerry Bron) kept going on and on and on, and in the end I thought, "well, perhaps it's better than it seems". So we did it. I didn't want to do it at first.

On 10 February 1967, the group recorded the song at Philips Studio, Marble Arch, London. The production was handled by Shel Talmy, who had collaborated with Manfred Mann on all their releases since the June 1966 recording of "Just Like a Woman". Neil Innes has claimed that the recording of the song took eight hours, as Gerry Bron would constantly nag about it to him. Drummer Mike Hugg instead states that the entire recording session lasted 22 hours, 12 of which were dedicated to the final master take of the song.

The song is rhythmically more complex than it appears; as Hazzard told Songfacts:

I was into odd time signatures at the time, like 5/4 and 7/8, and also inserting odd bars of 3/4 and 2/4 in a 4/4 song but in a way where the listener barely noticed because it sounded perfectly natural. This is one of those songs.

As with "Semi-Detached, Suburban Mr. James", Manfred Mann plays the Mellotron Mark II on the recording, the second of three of their single A-sides featuring the instrument. (Note: The final being "So Long, Dad!", released later in 1967.) However, Andy Thompson believes Mann's performance of the Mellotron on "Semi-Detached" is superior to the playing heard on "Ha! Ha! Said The Clown", though notes it is "still well worth hearing".

== Release and commercial performance ==
In the United Kingdom, "Ha! Ha! Said the Clown" would be released on 24 March 1967 through Fontana Records. (Note: Catalogue number Fontana TF 812.) Unusually for the UK at the time, the single was released in a picture sleeve, depicting a clown's makeup. The B-side "Feeling So Good" was written by Mann and drummer Mike Hugg, and once again followed the pattern of having self-composed B-sides contrasting to A-sides written by outside writers. According to Greg Russo, "Feeling So Good" was an "experiment with Mann and Hugg on lead vocals" where guitarist Tom McGuinness was mixed high and Klaus Voormann provided background vocals. Russo notes however that the nature of the record was never attempted again by the group. In the United States, "Ha! Ha! Said the Clown" was released through Mercury Records on 30 March 1967. (Note: Catalogue number Mercury 72675.) It would be the final Manfred Mann release until "Mighty Quinn" was released there in February 1968.

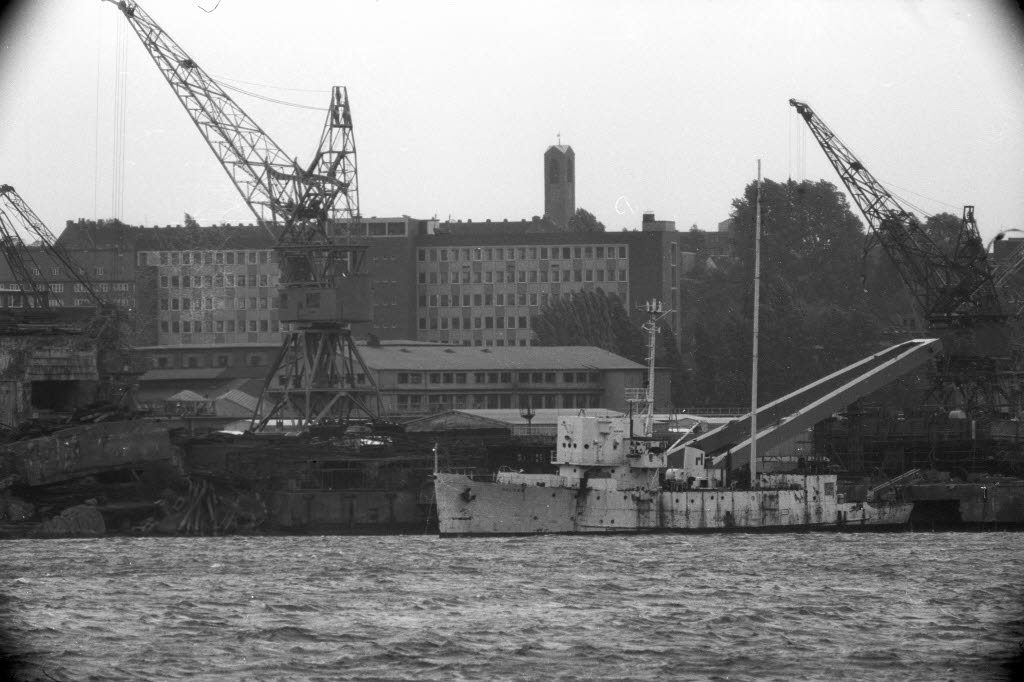
"Ha! Ha! Said the Clown reached number-one on Wonderful Radio London's (ship on right) Fab 40 chart.

Nonetheless, "Ha! Ha! Said the Clown" entered the Record Retailer chart two weeks after it was released on 5 April 1967 at a position of number 46. It peaked at number 4 on 26 April, staying there for two weeks before beginning its descent down the charts again. On the chart, it was last seen on 14 June at a position of number 50, having spent 11 weeks. In the charts published by rival magazines Melody Maker, New Musical Express and Disc and Music Echo, it also peaked at number 4. However, on pirate radio station Radio London's own list, Fab 40, it peaked at number one on 16 April 1967. The single saw extended appeal in Europe, reaching number one in Austria, Belgium, the Netherlands, and West Germany. In Africa, it also reached number one in South Africa, while it reached number 3 in Rhodesia. In Oceania, the single peaked at number 10 in Australia, and 2 in New Zealand. It did however fail to make the US chart despite being released there.

Both sides of the single got their first album released in November 1967 when it was released on the compilation album One Way, which was released by Fontana in Holland. In the United Kingdom, the song would first get an album release on Manfred Mann's fourth studio album Mighty Garvey!, released in the UK on 28 June 1968, almost one and a half years after it was recorded. On the album, it is sequenced between "Cubist Town" and "Harry the One-Man Band" on side two.The B-side's first UK release came on the compilation album What A Mann, released on 16 March 1968. In the United States, it was first released on the US equaivalent to Mighty Garvey!, The Mighty Quinn through Mercury Records on 6 May 1968, where it is sequenced as the second song on side one, following the title track.

== Critical reception and legacy ==
It was our manager Gerry who found the song. He was most insistent that we recorded it, usually he doesn't have too much to say about the top sides of singles, but he was so adamant that I thought, "well, he must have a point". Then, even though I didn't particularly like it, I had to convince the others that it was OK. Now, of course, the song has grown on me. I've heard it so many times. Funnily enough, it took us ages to get it finished in the studio, we must have heard it thousands and thousands of times. That was what put us off.

— Manfred Mann, interview, Record Mirror

In the UK, the single was met by mixed reviews. Writing for Disc and Music Echo, Penny Valentine states that the song "is excellently made" and "very well written", though she believes the title is a "little macabre". She writes that although "D'Abo sings well", she thinks there's "something about the record that doesn't quite click as a smash single." She believed the first half of the song was "marvellous", though she lost focus halfway through. She ends by claiming that it will be a hit, "though it doesn't sound top-5". The staff writer for Melody Maker believes that "Manfred Mann and his men have been around long enough now to know what's happening", noting that the band seemingly stopped making bad or "uncommercial records", and that Mike D'Abo has settled down. They claim that the single will become a hit, while also speculating over how big of a hit it will be, which they deem impossible without repeated listens. They end by claiming that the single has "catchy lyrics" and a "clever chorus" without sounding corny.

Manfred Mann, interview, Beat InstrumentalIn New Musical Express, Derek Johnson writes that the song was "conceived in much the same style as 'Semi-Detached, Suburban Mr. James'", comparing their falsetto harmonies, Mellotron sound, and "shake beat". Johnson calls the chorus "whistling" while simultaneously praising D'Abo's vocal performing, stating that he's handling it in style. Musically, however, he deems "Semi-Detached" to be better as it had a direct impact but ends with the notion that "it's a disc that grows on you." In Record Mirror, Peter Jones calls it "light-toned and very pacey". He writes that the song features some notable "instrumental tricks behind", while stating that it is musically different from the group's earlier material. Though he claims it most likely will become a hit "due to sheer professionalism and a sense of style", it most likely won't be a smash.

Retrospectively, the single has also received mixed reviews. Mike d'Abo, singer of the song, claims that he sang the song "10,000 times" while never liking it. McGuiness states that the record was "alright" as it was a big hit across Europe. Hugg also stated difficulty in performing the number on stage, owing to the multiple studio effects the song was dependent on. Greg Russo claims that "Ha! Ha! Said the Clown" predated the Moody Blues album Days of Future Passed by at least a few months. However, Russo also states that the Moody Blues saw great success with their albums because of the Mellotron, while Manfred Mann were confined to playing it on their singles and some album tracks.

== The Yardbirds version ==
=== Background and recording ===
"Ha Ha Said the Clown"
- 2011 reissue picture sleeve

Single by the Yardbirds
- B-side: "Tinker, Tailor, Soldier, Sailor"
- Released: 17 July 1967
- Recorded: 13 & 19 June 1967
- Studio: Columbia, New York City; Abbey Road, London
- Genre: Pop rock
- Length: 2:29
- Label: Epic
- Songwriter: Tony Hazzard
- Producer: Mickie Most

The Yardbirds singles chronology
"Little Games" (1967)	"Ha Ha Said the Clown" (1967)	"Ten Little Indians" (1967)

By 1967, English rock group the Yardbirds had become a quartet with Jimmy Page as the sole guitarist, but their record chart performance had begun to falter. To bolster the group's chances at another top 40 hit, successful pop singles producer Mickie Most was brought in to oversee their recordings. Most managed Manfred Mann at the time and tried to interest the Yardbirds in recording "Ha Ha Said the Clown". Manfred Mann's version failed to chart in the US, which gave the Yardbirds a new opportunity to try. Most was quoted as saying "Just try it and if you don't like it, we won't release it."

When the Yardbirds decided against recording the song, Most arranged for studio musicians to record it, to which singer Keith Relf later overdubbed a vocal. Yardbirds' chronicler Greg Russo described the version as "a carbon copy of Manfred Mann's #3 UK pop hit written by Tony Hazzard. With its British success, it made no sense to record a Yardbirds version for UK consumption." Relf later commented:

In the end, we were just a group being sent out to promote Mickie Most's records ... he used session men to do the backings, while we were touring, and then got me to overdub my voice. Incredible, isn't it? 'Ha Ha Said the Clown,' which was only put out in the States, was done that way, and in the end, we just got fed up with carrying on like that—he just didn't want to know about anything we created ourselves.

=== Release and reception ===
Released by Epic Records in the US in July 1967 as a Yardbirds single, it appeared at No. 45 on the Billboard Hot 100. In Canada, it was released by Capitol, where it reached number 38 on the RPM singles chart. Page biographer Chris Salewicz believed the song was "utterly inappropriate for the market they were trying to build in the United States"; the group were performing at popular counter culture venues, where they were developing more experimental fare, such as "Dazed and Confused". Several music journalists had similar opinions: "substandard" (Buckley); "lightweight" (Case); "inferior US-only cover" (Clayson); "downright bad ... bubblegum number" (Prown and Newquist); "gobsmackingly awful" (Shadwick, who also noted that Manfred Mann had even felt the song was "feeble"); and "particularly crass and inept" (Williamson).

Except for the original single, for years the Yardbirds' "Ha Ha Said the Clown" was relatively scarce. However, in 1992, it was included on the expanded Little Games Sessions & More double CD and in 2001, on the comprehensive group retrospective Ultimate!. Additionally, it was reissued, together with their next US single "Ten Little Indians", through Sundazed Music in time for Record Store Day 2011, a release which was housed in a picture sleeve.

=== Personnel ===
The instrumental backing was provided by session musicians in New York City; Keith Relf, the only Yardbird to appear on their release, later overdubbed the vocal in London.

- Keith Relf – vocals
- Al Gorgoni – guitar
- Bobby Gregg – drums
- Joe Macho Jr. – bass guitar
- Rick Nielsen – organ

== Chart performance ==
=== Manfred Mann version ===
Weekly chart performance for "Ha! Ha! Said the Clown"
Chart (1967)	Peak position
Australia (Go-Set)	10
Australia (Kent Music Report)	11
Austria (Disc Parade)	1
Belgium (Ultratop 50 Flanders)	1
Belgium (Ultratop 50 Wallonia)	1
Denmark (Danmarks Radio)	2
Finland (Suomen Virallinen)	40
France (IFOP)	3
Ireland (IRMA)	7
Netherlands (Dutch Top 40)	1
Netherlands (Single Top 100)	1
New Zealand (Listener)	2
Norway (VG-Lista)	2
Rhodesia (Lyons Maid)	3
South Africa (Springbok Radio)	1
Sweden (Kvällstoppen)	5
Sweden (Tio i Topp)	2
UK (Disc and Music Echo)	4
UK (Melody Maker)	4
UK (New Musical Express)	4
UK (Record Retailer)	4
West Germany (GfK)	1

=== Year-end charts ===
Year-end chart performance for "Ha! Ha! Said the Clown"
Chart (1967)	Peak position
Austria (Disc Parade)	9
Belgium (UltraTop 50 Flanders)	10
Netherlands (Dutch Top 40)	9

=== The Yardbirds version ===
Weekly chart performance for "Ha! Ha! Said the Clown"
Chart (1967)	Peak position
Canada Top Singles (RPM)	38
US Billboard Hot 100	45
US Cashbox Top 100	52
US Record World 100 Top Pops	45
