= Mighty Garvey! =

Music album by Manfred Mann

Studio album by Manfred Mann
- Released: 6 May 1968 (US); 28 June 1968 (UK)
- Recorded: 22 August 1966 – 12 March 1968
- Genres: Rock; pop; art pop; psychedelic pop; baroque pop
- Length: 38:54
- Labels: Mercury (US), Fontana (UK)
- Producer: Mike Hurst

Manfred Mann chronology
Up the Junction (1968)	Mighty Garvey! (1968)

Alternative cover
- US release

Singles from Mighty Garvey!
- 1. "Ha! Ha! Said the Clown" Released: 24 March 1967; 2. "Mighty Quinn" Released: 12 January 1968

Mighty Garvey! is the fifth and final studio album by Manfred Mann, released on 28 June 1968 by Fontana Records. In North America, Mercury Records issued the album under the title The Mighty Quinn with an altered track listing and different cover art. The album included the band's last number one single, a cover of Bob Dylan's "Mighty Quinn", as well as Tony Hazzard's song "Ha! Ha! Said the Clown", which was a top ten hit in the U.K. Despite the success of these two singles, the album met with limited commercial success upon release.

== Background and recording ==
Following the success of "Mighty Quinn" as a single, Mighty Garvey was assembled from a series of recording sessions which took place from 1966 to 1968, though the bulk of original material was recorded in early 1968 under the production of Mike Hurst. "Semi-Detached Suburban Mr. James", "The Vicar's Daughter", and "Each and Every Day" were recorded during the sessions for the band's previous album As Is; the latter of these songs was released as a single by Simon Dupree and the Big Sound in 1967 under the title "Day Time, Night Time".

For the album, Manfred Mann made heavy use of the mellotron, Klaus Voormann's woodwind instruments, and multi-layered vocal harmonies from all five band members. The increasing complexity of the songs' arrangements caused difficulties for the band when recording. "Ha! Ha! Said the Clown" went through several arrangements in the studio, and the final version was only completed after a substantial amount of editing. Mike Hugg later referred to the song as "the most aggravating record I've ever made." "Harry the One-Man Band" went through a similar process, with the final album version being stitched together from several different takes.

Despite the increasing songwriting output from both Mike d'Abo and Mike Hugg, the band continued to prefer the material of other songwriters for their singles. Having previously covered Bob Dylan's songs "If You Gotta Go, Go Now" and "Just Like a Woman" with great success, the band thus decided to cover "Mighty Quinn" in late 1967. Initially, Manfred Mann and Mike Hugg were unsatisfied with the recording and temporarily abandoned the song. On Mike d'Abo's insistence, the band returned to it a few months later and completed it. The song's B-side, "By Request of Edwin Garvey" was the first appearance of the album's titular character, "Garvey", a humorous alter-ego created by Mike d'Abo. Garvey appears during all three versions of "Happy Families" on the album. Mann later explained that Garvey "was just a mythical character we made up. It was just a joke. d'Abo played the role of Garvey."

== Reception ==
Professional ratings
Review scores
Source	Rating
AllMusic	3/5 stars
Rolling Stone	(moderate)

Mighty Garvey performed poorly upon release, reaching only 176 on the American charts and failing to chart at all in the band's native U.K. Like contemporary releases by The Kinks and The Zombies, Mighty Garvey! became a record esteemed more in retrospect than at the time. It was re-issued in 2003, with both the mono and stereo mix included.

== Track listing ==
Recording dates taken from Greg Russo's book Mannerisms: The Five Phases Of Manfred Mann.

=== Original UK release ===
Side one
No.	Title	Writer(s)	Recording date	Length
1.	"Happy Families" (with Eddie 'Fingers' Garvey)	Mike d'Abo	19 December 1966 & 5 March 1968	2:18
2.	"No Better, No Worse"	d'Abo	Spring 1968	3:02
3.	"Every Day Another Hair Turns Grey"	Mike Hugg	18 & 22 May 1967	2:54
4.	"Country Dancing"	d'Abo	16 January 1967	2:53
5.	"It's So Easy Falling"	Hugg	Spring 1968	3:20
6.	"Happy Families" (with Ed. Garvey and the Trio)	d'Abo	12 March 1968	2:09
7.	"Mighty Quinn"	Bob Dylan	26 October, 2 November & December 1967	2:52

Side two
No.	Title	Writer(s)	Recording date	Length
8.	"Big Betty"	Huddie Ledbetter	20 January 1967	3:06
9.	"The Vicar's Daughter"	d'Abo	22 August 1966	2:18
10.	"Each and Every Day"	Hugg	22 August 1966	2:47
11.	"Cubist Town"	Tom McGuinness, Charles Perrot	2 January 1968	3:21
12.	"Ha! Ha! Said the Clown"	Tony Hazzard	10 February 1967	2:27
13.	"Harry the One-Man Band"	Hugg	19 December 1966 & 5 March 1968	3:11
14.	"Happy Families" (with Edwin O'Garvey and his Showband)	d'Abo	19 December 1966	2:16

=== North American release ===
Side one
No.	Title	Writer(s)	Recording date	Length
1.	"The Mighty Quinn (Quinn The Eskimo)"	Dylan	26 October, 2 November & December 1967	2:51
2.	"Ha! Ha! Said the Clown"	Hazzard	10 February 1967	2:25
3.	"Everyday Another Hair Turns Grey"	Hugg	18 & 22 May 1967	2:56
4.	"It's So Easy Falling"	Hugg	Spring 1968	3:23
5.	"Big Betty"	Ledbetter	20 January 1967	3:06
6.	"Cubist Town"	McGuinness, Perrot	2 January 1968	3:19

Side two
No.	Title	Writer(s)	Recording date	Length
7.	"Country Dancing"	d'Abo	16 January 1967	2:56
8.	"Semi-Detached, Suburban Mr. James"	Geoff Stephens, John Carter	22 August 1966	2:37
9.	"The Vicar's Daughter"	d'Abo	22 August 1966	2:17
10.	"Each and Every Day"	Hugg	22 August 1966	2:47
11.	"No Better, No Worse"	d'Abo	Spring 1968	2:26

== Personnel ==
=== Manfred Mann ===
- Mike d'Abo – lead vocals
- Manfred Mann – keyboards, backing vocals
- Tom McGuinness – guitar, backing vocals
- Klaus Voormann – bass, woodwinds, backing vocals
- Mike Hugg – drums, percussion, backing vocals, harpsichord on "Every Day Another Hair Turns Grey"

=== Additional Musicians ===
- Colin Richardson – acoustic bass on "Happy Families" - The Eddie Garvey Trio
- Derek Wadsworth – trombone on "Each and Every Day"

=== Technical ===
- Mike Hurst – producer
- Keith Altham – liner notes
