= Jiro (musician) =

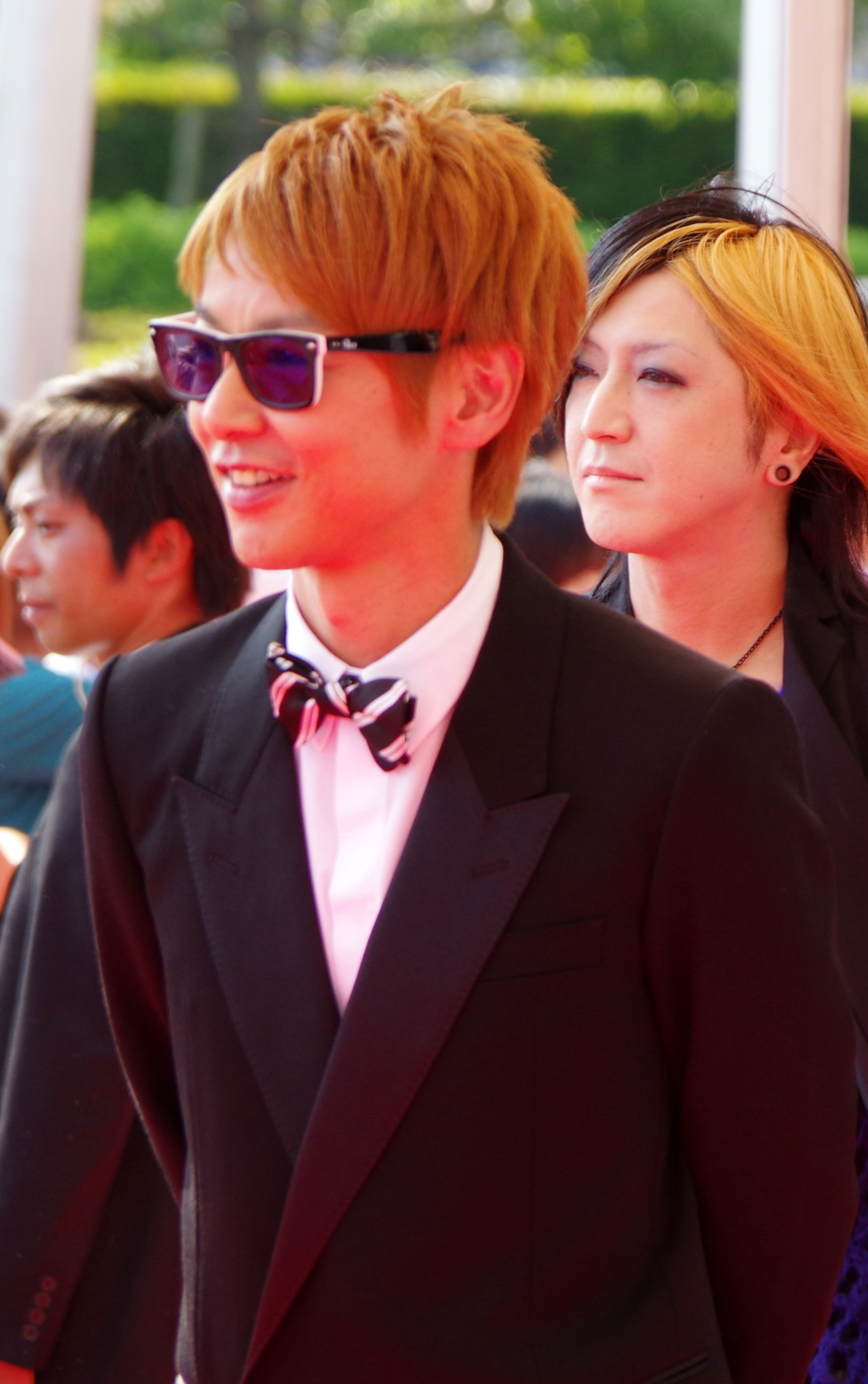
- Jiro at the 2014 MTV Video Music Awards Japan

Background information
- Also known as: Jiro
- Born: Yoshihito Wayama; October 17, 1972 (age 53); Hakodate, Hokkaido, Japan
- Genres: Rock
- Occupations: Musician
- Instruments: Bass; guitar
- Years active: 1990-present
- Labels: Toshiba-EMI; Capitol
- Member of: Glay; The Predators

Yoshihito Wayama (和山 義仁, Wayama Yoshihito; born October 17, 1972), better known by his stage name JIRO, is a Japanese musician best known as the bassist of the rock band Glay. He is also the bassist in the sideband The Predators.

== Biography ==
=== History ===
Jiro was born in Hakodate, Hokkaido, and grew up the only son of four children, his father a carpenter. Jiro was a guitarist in his first bands, and only picked up the bass when he joined the indie band Pierrot in Hakodate (different from the well-known band of the same name). Jiro first became familiar with Takuro and the rest of GLAY as they attended another high school in the same town, and were mutually involved in the local indie scene. In 1992, Pierrot moved to Tokyo to expand their career, but disbanded shortly after. He states that during this time he owned nothing other than what he had carried in his backpack when traveling from Hakodate, and had walked part of the journey to save money. Jiro worked in construction in Tokyo before being invited by Takuro to join Glay. At first he declined due to his doubts about a stable career in music but as Takuro insisted, he agreed to play one concert with them. He ended up staying in the band afterward. When asked his name after one of his early gigs with the band, he was reluctant to reveal his given name which he felt was "uncool" and spontaneously chose the pseudonym "Jiro" which he continued to use as a stage name and nickname from that point onward.

Jiro is considered the baby-faced in the group and was a favorite among teenage girls. Together with his bandmate Hisashi, the two are particularly known for their visual kei looks and on-stage theatrics; however, in recent years the pair have toned down their image, sporting more contemporary clothing and hairstyles. Jiro appeared on the covers of magazines such as Pati-Pati and was an early spokesmodel for Sony's Aibo. He wrote a regular column, "Caramel Box", for the magazine What's In and continues to host a radio show called "Buggy Crash Night" on Funky802 FM.

=== Personal life ===
In 2000, Jiro married Reiko, former editor of the music magazine What's In.

== Songs by Jiro ==
=== For Glay ===
- Shutter Speeds no Tema, from 1996 album BELOVED(music by Jiro, lyrics by Takuro).
- Kanariya, from BELOVED (music by Jiro, lyrics by Takuro).
- Biribiri Crashman, from 1998 album pure soul(music by Jiro, lyrics by Takuro).
- Good bye bye Sunday, from 2000 single Tomadoi/Special Thanks(music and lyrics by Jiro).
- TIME, from 2000 single Missing You(music e lyrics).
- Highway #5, from 2001 album ONE LOVE(music and lyrics).
- Mister Popcorn, from album ONE LOVE(music and lyrics).
- NEVERLAND, from 2002 album "UNITY ROOTS & FAMILY, away" (music by Jiro, lyrics by Takuro).
- BUGS IN MY HEAD, from 2004 album THE FRUSTRATED (music and lyrics).
- AMERICAN INNOVATION, from 2007 LOVE IS BEAUTIFUL(music by Jiro, lyrics by Takuro).

=== For The Predators ===
- Dizzy Life, from 2005 album Hunting! (music by Jiro, lyrics by Sawao Yamanaka).
- Sleepy Dragon, from 2005 album Hunting! (music by Jiro, lyrics by Sawao Yamanaka).
- Lizard Man, from 2005 album Hunting! (music by Jiro, lyrics by Sawao Yamanaka).
- Rock'n'Roll Lay Down, from 2008 album Kiba wo Misero (music by Jiro, lyrics by Sawao Yamanaka).
- Shoot the Moon, from 2008 album Kiba wo Misero (music by Jiro, lyrics by Sawao Yamanaka).
- Island, from 2008 album Kiba wo Misero (music by Jiro, lyrics by Sawao Yamanaka).
- Wild Tiger, from 2008 album Kiba wo Misero (music by Jiro, lyrics by Sawao Yamanaka).
