= Takuro (musician) =

Japanese musician

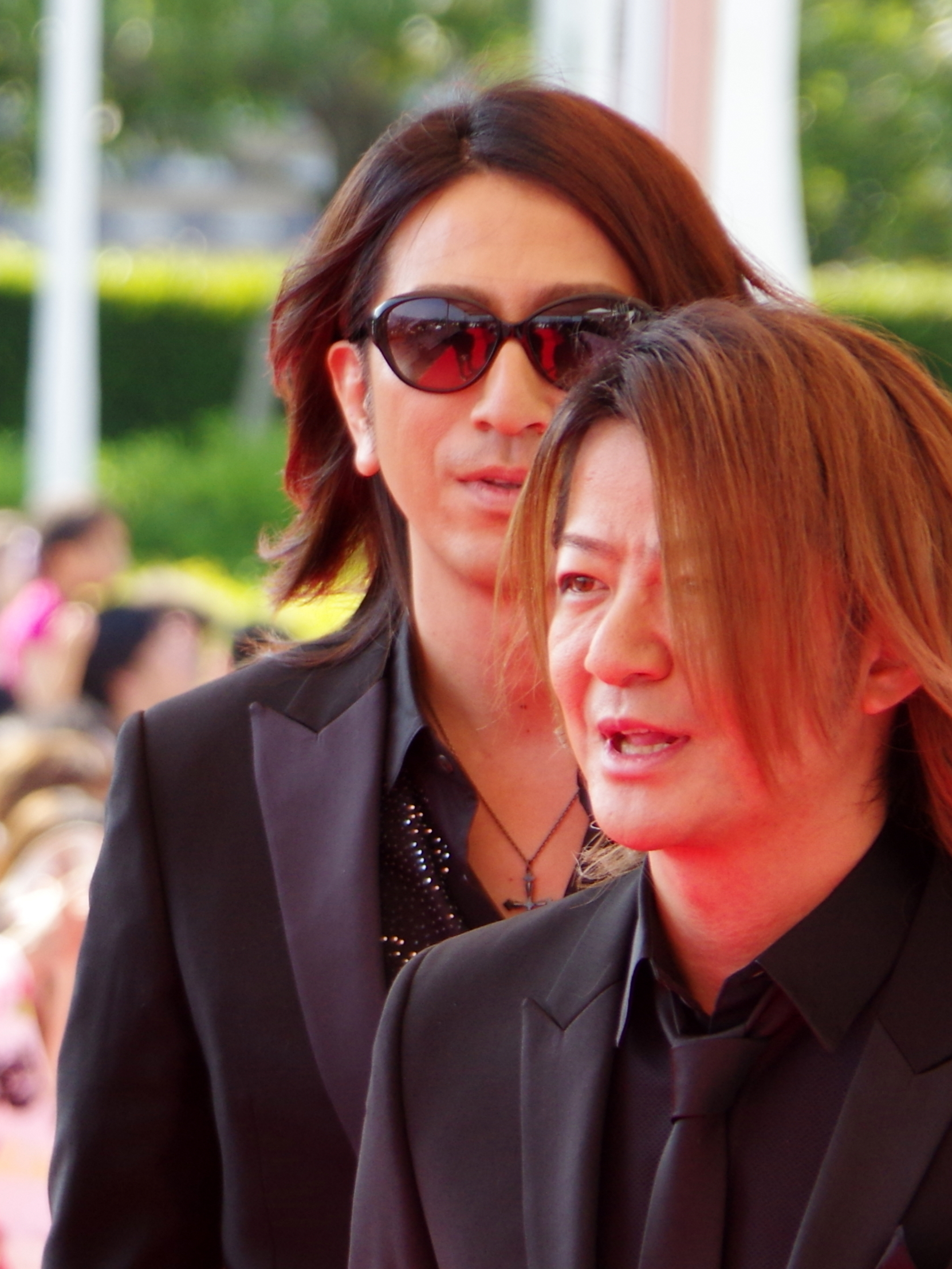
- Takuro in 2014

Background information
- Born: Takuro Kubo; May 26, 1971 (age 54); Hakodate, Hokkaido, Japan
- Genres: Rock
- Occupations: Musician; lyricist
- Instruments: Guitar; keyboards; piano
- Years active: 1988–present
- Labels: Toshiba-EMI; Capitol
- Member of: Glay

Takurō Kubo (Japanese: 久保 琢郎, Hepburn: Kubo Takurō; born May 26, 1971 in Hakodate, Hokkaido), better known by his stage name TAKURO, is a Japanese musician and lyricist best known as one of the guitarists and leader of the rock band Glay, for which he is also the main composer and lyricist. As a musician and composer, Takuro has worked with different artists and has also released solo works.

Takuro and his older sister were raised by a single mother, as she never remarried after his father's death, when Takuro was three years old. He considers his mother an early influence in his musical career, as he was strongly impressed by her singing.

== Biography ==
=== History ===
When he was a child, his mother used to sing while crying. He didn't know what was wrong with her but he felt what she felt as she sang, and he listened to her. The tone of singing becomes stronger as one sings. He was impressed by how his mother sang. He felt the power of singing. Before he started thinking about her situation, he listened to her singing. She started softly but became stronger and he felt that the power of singing encourages people. He has believed in that power ever since

— Glay Kiseki to Eikou no Mukouni (NHK Television's 1999 Documentary on Glay)

Later on, during his adolescence, he would be influenced by John Lennon, and would develop a great interest in writing lyrics. His lyrics are often based on his feelings about different situations in his life, as well as events in the world.

Takuro often expresses his opinion on different issues, and has been invited to write about different topics by newspapers. In 2007 he wrote a series of articles about his homeland, Hakodate for the Asahi newspaper. In 2006, he was quoted in an article about new concepts of Japanese family models in the Mainichi website. Being raised in a single mother family, he expressed his personal experience.

In 2001, together with Ryuichi Sakamoto, Takuro started the "Artists Power", an organization that brings together musicians interested in being active in the search of alternative energy. The EXPO 2001 concert in Ishikari, Hokkaido, had part of its energy generated by alternative fuel and a booth displaying the generators could be seen.

In 2003 Takuro released "Kyoukai", an auto-biographical book, in which he writes about his personal life and his musical work. The topics are his childhood in Hakodate and his career; among the subjects is a mysterious woman who he loved for ten years and who turned him down when he proposed marriage to her and for whom he wrote many of his love songs.

In 2005, Takuro ended his radio show on Tokyo FM, "Glay Radio Communication DX", which he had started in 2003. Previously, he hosted another show, "Takuro Radio Factory".

=== Personal life ===
Takuro married the Japanese model Seri Iwahori in May 2004. He was introduced to her during the shooting of the movie Casshern, in which he made a short cameo with Hisashi in 2003. They have a son, born in October 2005 and a daughter, born in October 2007. They own a house in Los Angeles, California and also one in Tokyo.

== Solo albums ==
Album: Instrumental Collection

- artist: TAKURO
- release date: September 19, 1998
- Tracks:
  - HOWEVER
  - SOUL LOVE
  - Yes, Summerdays
  - Ikiteku Tsuyosa
  - Miyako Wasure
  - a Boy~Zutto Wasurenai~
  - Kuchibiru
  - Manatsuno Tobira
  - Zutto Futari de...
  - Glorious
  - Yuuwaku
  - BELOVED

Album: FLOW of SOUL vol 1. Takuro meets Vanessa Mae

- artists: Takuro and Vanessa Mae
- release date : April 24, 2002
- tracks:
  - Way of Difference
  - Francis Elena featuring Vanessa Mae
  - Zutto Futtari de・・
  - Glorious
  - a Boy ～zutto wasurenai～
  - Kanojo no "Modern・・・"
  - HOWEVER
  - I'm in Love
  - Yuuwaku
  - Biribiri crashman
  - Sen no naifu ga mune wo sasu
  - Pure Soul

== Stealth ==
Takuro and Toki, from Japanese band C:4, have collaborated under the name "Stealth". Together they released the single "Re-lax" on September 25, 2002. In May 2009 they played live for the first time, with other well-known musicians. On October 13, 2010, Stealth released the song "-Sickbed-" digitally on their own website. They also announced the release of their first album "Alstroemeria", but didn't provide detailed information on this record.

== Songwriting for other artists ==
- "Summer Shakes" and "I believe you"
  - Single: Summer Shakes
  - artist:Miju
- "Mitsumeteitai" and "Moon~ watashi he"
  - Single: Mitsumeteitai
  - Artist:ROMI
- "Couples" and "Love Is Always Trouble"
  - Single: Couples
  - artist: Miju
- "Love Clover" and "Empty Pocket"
  - Single: Love Clover
  - artist: Miho Nakayama
- kokoro ni amega
  - Single: kokoro ni amega
  - artist: Hideki Ohtoku
- Fairyland
  - Single: Fairyland
  - artist: Yuki Koyanagi

(under the pseudonym "L. Soul")

- Rhythm to Rule
  - Single: Rhythm to Rule
  - artist: Ryoko Shinohara

(composed the music under the pseudonym "L. Soul")

- "Drama" and "Time Limit"
  - Album: Distance
  - artist: Hikaru Utada

(composed the music with Utada Hikaru under the name "Kubo Takuro". "Time Limit" was also released as a single)

- Sweet Season
  - single: Sweet Season
  - artist: SONO

(composed the music under the pseudonym "L.Soul")

- Engaged
  - Album: Hana
  - artist: Tak Matsumoto

(music by Takuro and Tak Matsumoto)

- Lovebite
  - Album: Style
  - artist: Namie Amuro
- Fuyu no etorage
  - Album: Singer for Singer
  - artist: Misia

(theme song for the movie Umineko, with backing vocals by TERU)

- Ruten
  - Album: Romantic Energy
  - artist: Joshijunigakubo (Twelve Girls Band)
- Kiss from a Rose
  - Album: Sing and Roses
  - artist: Misato Watanabe

(music)

- "Hitoiro" and "Eyes for the Moon"
  - Single: Hitoiro
  - artist: Nana starring Mika Nakashima

("Hitoiro" is theme song for the movie Nana 2 and "Eyes for the Moon" is in the movie's sound track).

- Say Something
  - Album: In the Mood
  - artist: Kyosuke Himuro

(lyrics)

- Go ahead!!!
  - Single: Go Ahead!!!
  - artist: Mitsuhiro Oikawa

(music)

- Koi Suru Kimochi
  - Single:Koi Suru Kimochi
  - Artist:Emi Takei

(Takei's debut single)

== Special features ==
Single: Bridge over troubled water

- artist: Junko
- song: Together (guitar)

Album: Poetic Evolution

- artist: Yukinojo Mori
- song: Ango (with HISASHI and TERU)

single: ZERO LANDMINE

- artist: N.M.L.(NO MORE LANDMINE)
- song: ZERO LANDMINE (guitar)

Album: Kuzu Album

- artist: Kuzu
- song: ai nante (with TERU)

Album: In the Mood

- artist: Kyosuke Himuro
- song: Say Something (with Glay)

== Books ==
- Along the Line: photobook made in Africa.
- Kyoukai (2003): autobiography.
- "Super Stars" (November 2006): photobook by Leslie Kee. Takuro was one of the three hundred famous Asian people featured in the book.
- Hokkaido e (July 2008): includes a series of articles written by Takuro, along with articles by other authors, originally published by Asahi Newspaper in 2007.
