= Winnipeg (bear) =

American Black bear at London Zoo, 1914–1934

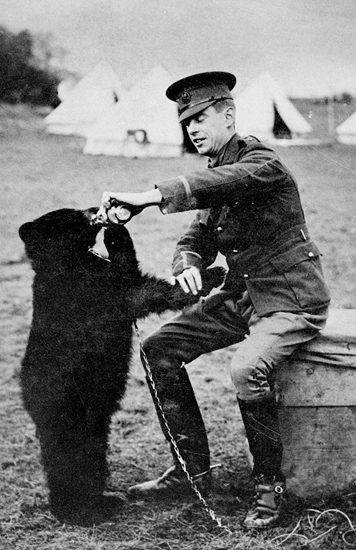
- Harry Colebourn and Winnie, 1914
- Other name: Winnie
- Species: American black bear
- Sex: Female
- Born: 1914; Ontario, Canada
- Died: 12 May 1934 (aged 20); London Zoo, London, England
- Known for: Inspiration for Winnie-the-Pooh
- Owner: Harry Colebourn
- Named after: The city of Winnipeg

Winnipeg (1914 – 12 May 1934), or Winnie, was a female black bear that lived at London Zoo from 1915 until her death in 1934. Purchased from a hunter by cavalry veterinarian Harry Colebourn, Winnie is best-remembered for inspiring the name of A. A. Milne and E. H. Shepard's character, Winnie-the-Pooh.

== History ==
Upon the outbreak of World War I in August 1914, Lt. Harry Colebourn of The Fort Garry Horse, a Canadian cavalry regiment, volunteered his service. On 24 August, while en route to Valcartier in Quebec to report to the Canadian Army Veterinary Corps (CAVC) as part of the Canadian Expeditionary Force, he purchased a young bear cub for CA$20 (equivalent to $547 in 2025) at a train stop in White River, Ontario. The bear's mother was probably killed in the spring of 1914 when the cub was very young and could most easily have become socialized to humans. The name of the hunter who sold the bear and who presumably provided the bear's early socialisation is undocumented. Colebourn named the bear "Winnipeg Bear", "Winnie" for short, after his adopted home city of Winnipeg, Manitoba.

Winnie accompanied him to Valcartier and all the way to England, becoming the mascot of the CAVC and a pet to the Second Canadian Infantry Brigade Headquarters. According to Colebourn’s six diaries that he kept during the war, on 3 October 1914, he and Winnie departed Gaspé Bay enroute for England aboard the S.S. Manitou along with numerous other liners filled with troops heading for England. On October 17, they disembarked and left Davenport, Greater Manchester, for Salisbury Plain at 7:00 that morning.

Before leaving for France, Colebourn left Winnie at London Zoo on 9 December 1914.

Winnie's eventual destination was expected to be Assiniboine Park Zoo in Winnipeg, but at the end of the war, Colebourn allowed her to remain at the London Zoo, where she was much loved for her playfulness and gentleness.

In 1919, the London Zoo held a dedication ceremony and erected a plaque that states Colebourn donated Winnie.

Among Winnie's fans at the London Zoo was A. A. Milne's son Christopher Robin, who frequently visited the bear starting from 1924. Christopher Robin consequently changed the name of his own teddy bear from "Edward Bear" to "Winnie the Pooh" – a combination of Winnipeg Bear's name and a nickname he had given to a swan that he used to feed in the morning – providing the inspiration for his father's stories about Winnie-the-Pooh. In Milne's introduction to his first book about the bear, Winnie-the-Pooh (1926), he writes:

So when Christopher Robin goes to the Zoo, he goes to where the Polar Bears are, and he whispers something to the third keeper from the left, and doors are unlocked, and we wander through dark passages and up steep stairs, until at last we come to the special cage, and the cage is opened, and out trots something brown and furry, and with a happy cry of "Oh, Bear!" Christopher Robin rushes into its arms. Now this bear’s name is Winnie, which shows what a good name for bears it is, but the funny thing is that we can’t remember whether Winnie is called after Pooh, or Pooh after Winnie. We did know once, but we have forgotten...

== Recognition ==
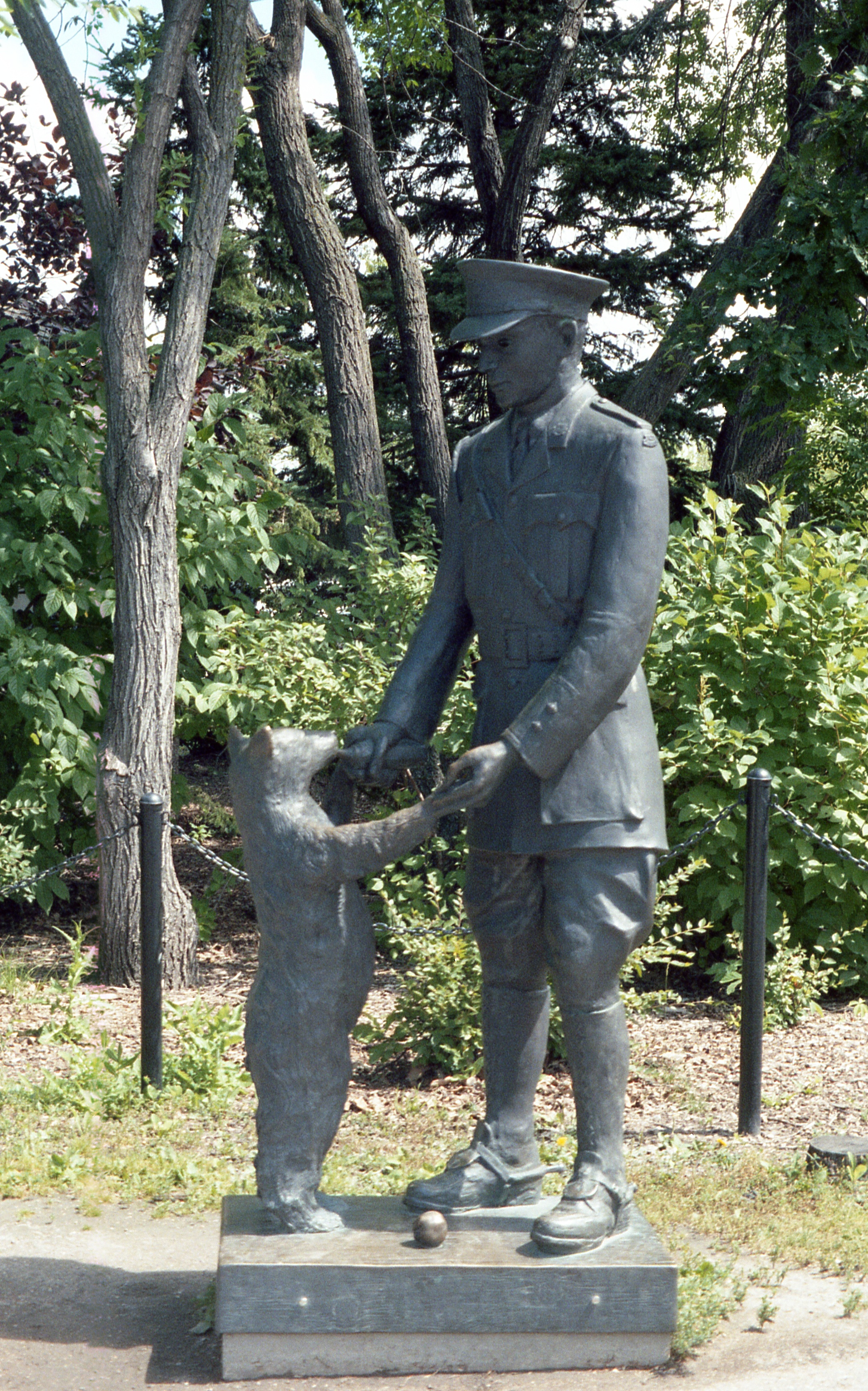
Winnie-the-Bear statue in Assiniboine Park Zoo in Winnipeg, Manitoba, Canada

There are several statues and plaques commemorating Winnipeg Bear. In 1981, a statue of a bear cub by sculptor Lorne McKean was unveiled at the London Zoo, along with a plaque commemorating Winnie.

A bronze statue of Winnie and Colebourn holding hands, by sculptor William Epp, stands in Assiniboine Park in Winnipeg, in the park's Nature Playground. Originally unveiled on 6 August 1992 at Assiniboine Park Zoo, the statue and plaque were donated by the Kinsmen Club of Winnipeg. Epp's design is also seen in another statue at the London Zoo that was placed in 1993. Assiniboine Park also houses a small exhibit in its Pavilion Gallery called The Pooh Gallery, displaying "objects, archives, books, and works of art" that "reveal the multiple identities and histories of Winnie-the-Pooh."

In 1996, Canada Post issued "Winnie and Lieutenant Colebourn, White River, 1914" stamps designed by Wai Poon with art direction by Anthony Van Bruggen and computer design by Marcelo Caetano. The 45¢ stamps are perforated 12.5 x 13 mm and were printed by Ashton-Potter Limited.

In 1997, a plaque was donated to the London Zoo by the town of White River, Ontario, where Colebourn first met Winnie. On 30 May 1999, a special plaque commemorating the service of Colebourn to The Fort Garry Horse and Canadian Army Veterinary Corps was placed in the Zoo near the site of Winnie’s former home.

Following Winnie's death in 1934, her skull was kept in the Odontological Museum at the Royal College of Surgeons Hunterian Museum in London, and went on public display for the first time in 2015.

== Portrayal in media ==
The story of Winnie the bear was portrayed in the 2004 film A Bear Named Winnie, starring Michael Fassbender as Colebourn and Bonkers, a 1,000-pound male American black bear, as the adult Winnie.

In 2011, Winnipeg author M.A. Appleby, whose father was a friend of Colebourn's son, wrote a children's book about the bear's life, titled Winnie the Bear.

In 2015, the children's book Finding Winnie by Colebourn's great-granddaughter Lindsay Mattick was published. It is richly illustrated and describes Winnipeg's story in a way that is accessible to children, though still based in facts. The book won the 2016 Caldecott Medal.

== Gallery ==
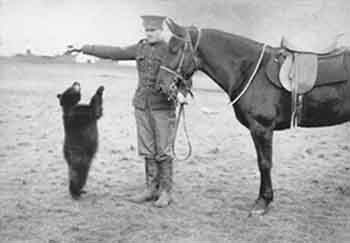
Winnie the Bear as a cub with a sergeant of the CAVC

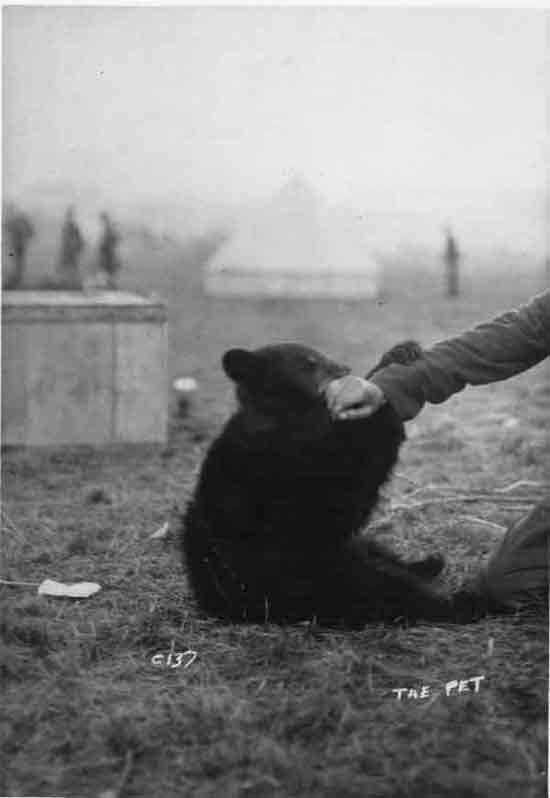
Winnie plays with a soldier's sleeve

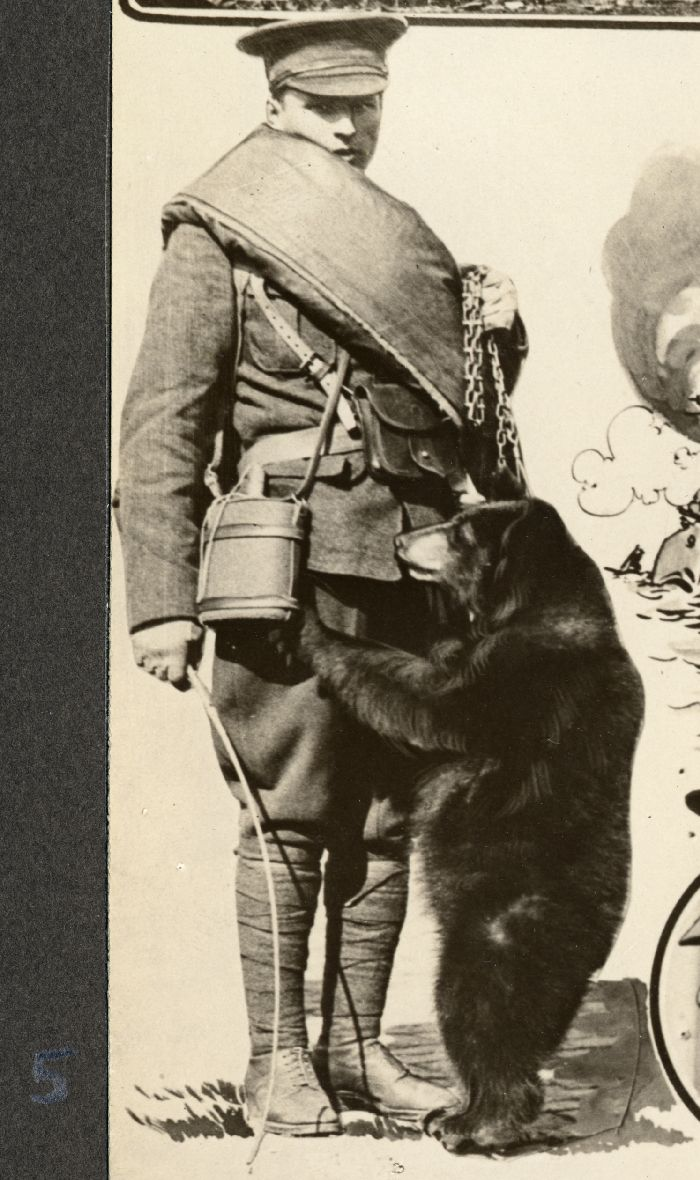
Winnie the Bear as a cub with an unidentified Canadian soldier

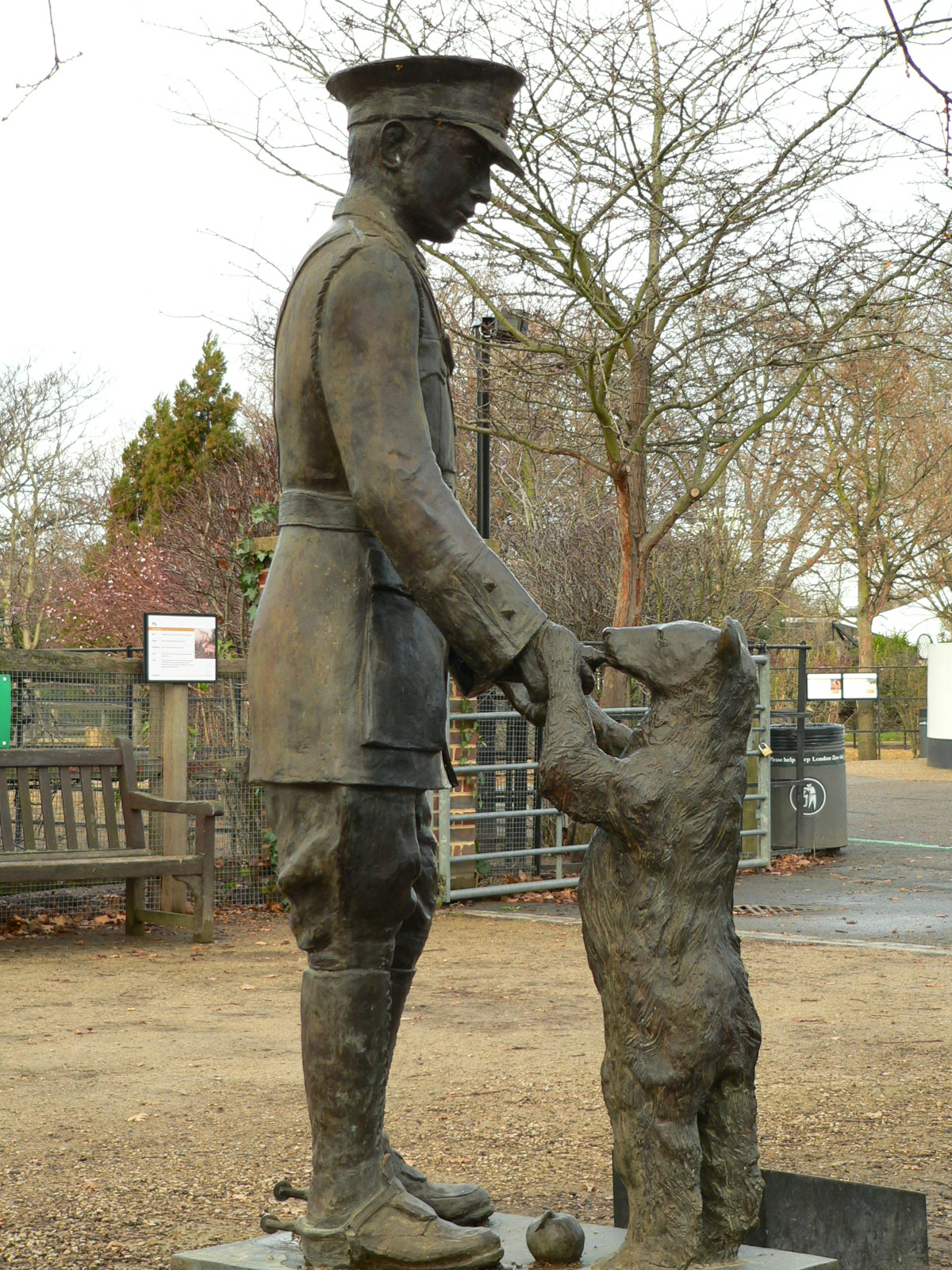
London Zoo statue.

== See also ==
- Wojtek (bear)
- Winnie-the-Pooh
- Winnie the Pooh (franchise)
- List of individual bears
