= Royal Canadian Army Veterinary Corps =

- Active: 1910–1940
- Country: Canada
- Branch: Canadian Militia, Canadian Expeditionary Force
- Type: Administrative corps
- Role: Veterinary medicine

The Royal Canadian Army Veterinary Corps (RCAVC) was an administrative corps of the Canadian Militia.

The Canadian Army Permanent Veterinary Corps was founded in 1910. The Canadian Army Permanent Veterinary Corps was redesignated the Royal Canadian Army Veterinary Corps on 3 Nov 1919. The Royal Canadian Army Veterinary Corps was redesignated The Royal Canadian Army Veterinary Corps on 17 Jul 1936. The Royal Canadian Army Veterinary Corps was disbanded on 2 Nov 1940.

The cap badge of the RCAVC was similar to that of Britain's Royal Army Veterinary Corps, but featured a larger figure of Chiron in a wreath of maple leaves surmounted by the Tudor crown, with the letters RCAVC on the ribbon.

== History ==
Until 1910 veterinarians in the Canadian Army were part of the old regimental system. Most veterinarians held a commission in the active militia and left private practice for 10–15 days a year to serve with his regiment. There was only a small number of permanently employed regimental veterinary officers.

In 1910 the Canadian Army Veterinary Service, under the quartermaster-general of the Canadian Militia, came into existence and had three branches: the Canadian Permanent Army Veterinary Corps (CPAVC), the Canadian Army Veterinary Corps (CAVC) and the Regimental Veterinary Service, which was being phased out. By the outbreak of war in 1914, the Regimental Veterinary Service had ceased to exist, the CPAVC was still incomplete, so the majority of veterinarians and other ranks were found in the CAVC.

The CAVC was organized into seven sections, though only two, Winnipeg and Montreal, were at a state of readiness at the outbreak of war: London, Ontario; Toronto; Kingston, Ontario; Quebec; Halifax, Nova Scotia; Winnipeg and Calgary. There was also a senior veterinary officer, headquartered in Kingston. Within each division or district, there was a principal veterinary officer. Provision was also made for the Canadian Army Veterinary School.

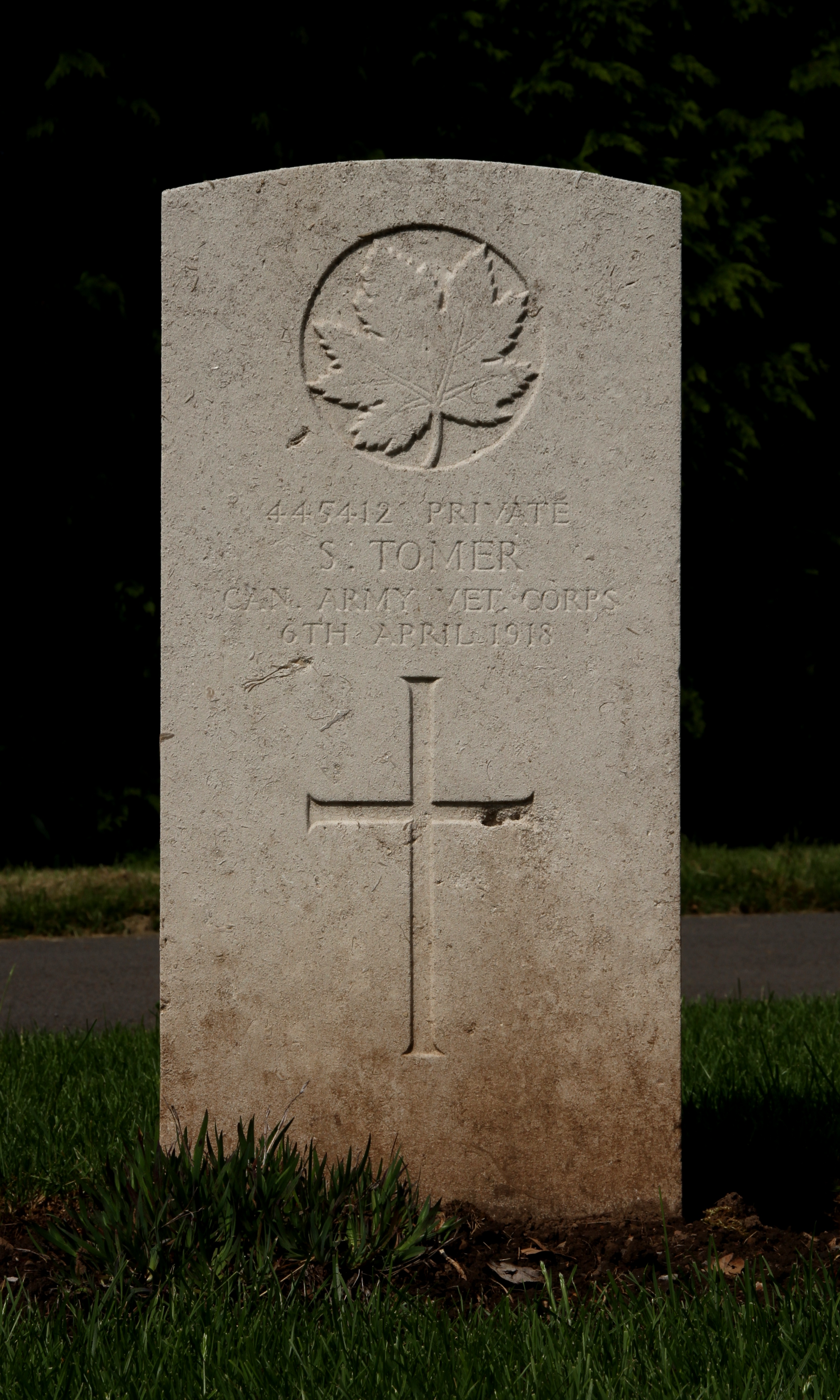
Grave in Cathays Cemetery, Cardiff, of CAVC Private S. Tomer, who died in 1918

In 1919 the CPAVC was reconstituted as the Royal Canadian Army Veterinary Corps. In 1940, the RCAVC was disbanded by the Privy Council and the recommendation of the Treasury Board, in order to save $10,334.

== Prominent members ==
Captain Harry Colebourn (April 12, 1887 – September 24, 1947), a veterinarian with the Royal Canadian Army Veterinary Corps, is best known for donating a bear cub, named "Winnie" (short for "Winnipeg"), to the London Zoo. He had purchased the young black bear in White River, Ontario, while en route to Camp Valcartier in Quebec.

== Related units ==
This unit was allied with the Royal Army Veterinary Corps.
