= Finding Winnie =

2015 children's book by Lindsay Mattick

Finding Winnie: The True Story of the World’s Most Famous Bear
- Author: Lindsay Mattick
- Illustrator: Sophie Blackall
- Language: English
- Genre: Children's
- Publisher: Little, Brown Books for Young Readers
- Publication date: October 2015
- Publication place: United States
- Pages: 56 pp
- ISBN: 978-0316324908

Finding Winnie: The True Story of the World's Most Famous Bear is a 2015 children's book written by Canadian author Lindsay Mattick and illustrated by Sophie Blackall. The non-fiction book is framed as a story Mattick is telling to her son. Her great-grandfather, Harry Colebourn bought a bear on his way to fight in World War I, donating the bear to a zoo where it became the inspiration for the character of Winnie-the-Pooh. Finding Winnie was thoroughly researched by both Blackall and Mattick. The book's writing and illustrations were well reviewed and it won the 2016 Caldecott Medal.

== Background and publication ==
Sophie Blackall agreed to illustrate the book, even though she was not planning to accept new book assignments, because she felt that her own story was like that of the bear Winnie. In particular, Blackall, and the book's editor, both cited Blackall's decision to immigrate to New York just as Winnie would move from Canada to Europe. Blackall also had an affinity for Winnie-the-Pooh, as the book was the first she ever bought with her own money. Author Lindsay Mattick loved hearing the story of her great-grandfather as a child. As an adult, she learned more about her great-grandfather, who never knew his role in inspiring the book, while reading his diaries from fighting in World War I saying, "The joy and love Harry found in adopting Winnie is in stark contrast to the realities of WWI." She was moved to write the book to explain her son Cole's name to him.

Before its publication, the book's movie rights were optioned. The book was published in October 2015 and was later expanded into a 144-page book, Winnie's Great War. The original book was released as an audiobook in April 2016 and was narrated by Erin Moon.

== Synopsis ==
The book is told by a mother, the author Mattick, telling a story of her great-grandfather to her son. In 1914, veterinarian Harry Colebourn, Mattick's great-grandfather, rides a train across Canada on his way to serve in World War I. Finding an orphaned female bear on the platform of the railway station at White River, Ontario for sale for $20 ($547 today), he names it "Winnie" after his hometown of Winnipeg. After first being skeptical of the bear, she becomes Colebourn's regiment's mascot, accompanying the soldiers to training in England. When the regiment moves to the front in France, Colebourn finds a home for Winnie at London Zoo. There the bear makes friends with a boy named Christopher Robin and inspires A. A. Milne to write the story of Winnie-the-Pooh, while Colebourn returns home to Canada at the end of the war to start a family. At the end of the book there are some of the photos and documents behind the story.

== Writing and illustrations ==
Blackall illustrated the book with Chinese ink and watercolors. Blackall's simple warm illustrations matched well with text which had elements of a fable. She spent a year illustrating the book, conducting extensive research in order to get details of the period correct, for instance taking a week just to draw the map of the zoo. Blackall used a box of family mementos from Mattick as a touchpoint.

Mattick's "playful" writing complements Blackall's illustrations. The framing device of having it be a story told to a child helps to reinforce the book's theme of family. It also echoes Milne's work, with the voice of Cole paralleling that of Christopher Robin. Mattick was careful not to invent dialogue or otherwise deviate from the historical record found in her grandfather's diaries.

== Reception and awards ==
The book was well received with starred reviews in Booklist, Horn Book, where reviewer Thom Barthelmess praised that, "The sum total is as captivating as it is informative, transforming a personal family story into something universally resonant," and School Library Journal, which also gave a starred review to the audiobook. In The New York Times Book Review, Maria Russo praised the book and described it as "gorgeously illustrated." Reviews compared the book to Sally M. Walker's Winnie: The True Story of the Bear That Inspired Winnie-the-Pooh which was published earlier in 2015. In a generally positive review, Jeannette Hulick in The Bulletin of the Center for Children's Books noted the ethical implications of bringing a bear across the ocean and potentially to war are, "mostly glossed over by the book’s romanticizing of Colebourn’s decision."

Illustrator Blackall won the 2015 Caldecott Medal for the book. The win caused an additional 5000 copies to be sold in the first week after the award. In her acceptance speech, Blackall expressed her gratitude for being awarded the medal and recalled, "I will remember the sound of our mingled laughing-and-crying for as long as I live."

The book publicized the fact that the historical bear Winnie was a female, setting-off speculation that the literary character was also a girl. This is generally thought not to be the case judging by the use of pronouns in Milne's book as well as the sex of Christopher Robin's bear doll, Edward.

Awards
Preceded by The Adventures of Beekle: The Unimaginary Friend	Caldecott Medal; 2016	Succeeded by Radiant Child: The Story of Young Artist Jean-Michel Basquiat
