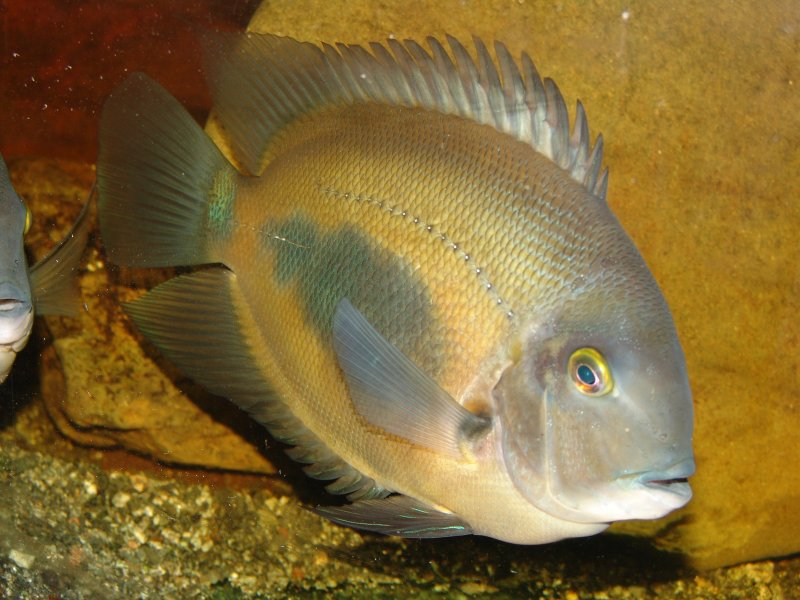

Scientific classification
- Domain: Eukaryota
- Kingdom: Animalia
- Phylum: Chordata
- Class: Actinopterygii
- Order: Cichliformes
- Family: Cichlidae
- Genus: Uaru
- Species: U. amphiacanthoides

Binomial name
- Uaru amphiacanthoides Heckel, 1840

Synonyms
- Pomotis fasciatus Jardine, 1843; Uaru obscurum Günther, 1862; Acara imperialis Steindachner, 1879

= Uaru amphiacanthoides =

Species of fish

Uaru amphiacanthoides, the uaru or triangle cichlid, is a species of cichlid native to South America where it occurs in clear streams of the Amazon Basin. This species can reach a length of 25 centimetres (9.8 in) SL. It is also of importance as a food fish for native peoples and can be found in the aquarium trade.

== See also ==
- List of freshwater aquarium fish species
