= London Zoo =

World's oldest scientific zoo, in London, England

- Logo as it appears on 2021 online map
- Interactive map of London Zoo
- 51°32′08″N 00°09′21″W
- Date opened: 27 April 1828; 198 years ago
- Location: Regent's Park; London, NW1; United Kingdom
- Land area: 36 acres (15 ha)
- No. of animals: 8,469 (2026)
- No. of species: 383 (2026)
- Annual visitors: 1,213,187 in 2025
- Memberships: BIAZA, EAZA, WAZA
- Major exhibits: Gorilla Kingdom, Animal Adventure, Blackburn Pavilion, Clore Rainforest Lookout, Into Africa, Tiger Territory, Land of the Lions and Penguin Beach.
- Website: www.londonzoo.org

London Zoo, previously known as ZSL London Zoo or London Zoological Gardens and sometimes called Regent's Park Zoo, is the world's oldest scientific zoo. It was opened in London on 27 April 1828 and was originally intended to be used as a collection for scientific study. In 1831, the Tower of London menagerie animals were transferred to the zoo's collection. It was opened to the public in 1847. At its peak, the Zoo attracted over 3 million annual visitors and exhibited over 900 species. As of 2026, London Zoo still houses more than 8,000 individuals from over 300 species, making it one of the largest zoological collections in the United Kingdom.

It is managed under the aegis of the Zoological Society of London (established in 1826) and is situated at the northern edge of Regent's Park, on the boundary line between the City of Westminster and the borough of Camden (the Regent's Canal runs through it). The Society also cares for the largest zoo in the UK by area, Whipsnade Zoo in Bedfordshire, where larger animals, such as elephants and rhinos, have been moved. As well as being the first scientific zoo, London Zoo also opened the first reptile house (1849), the first public aquarium (1853), the first insect house (1881) and the first children's zoo (1938).

The Society receives no state funding and relies on 'Fellows' and 'Patrons,' memberships, entrance fees, venue hire, and sponsorship to generate revenue.

== History ==
=== 1828–1938 ===
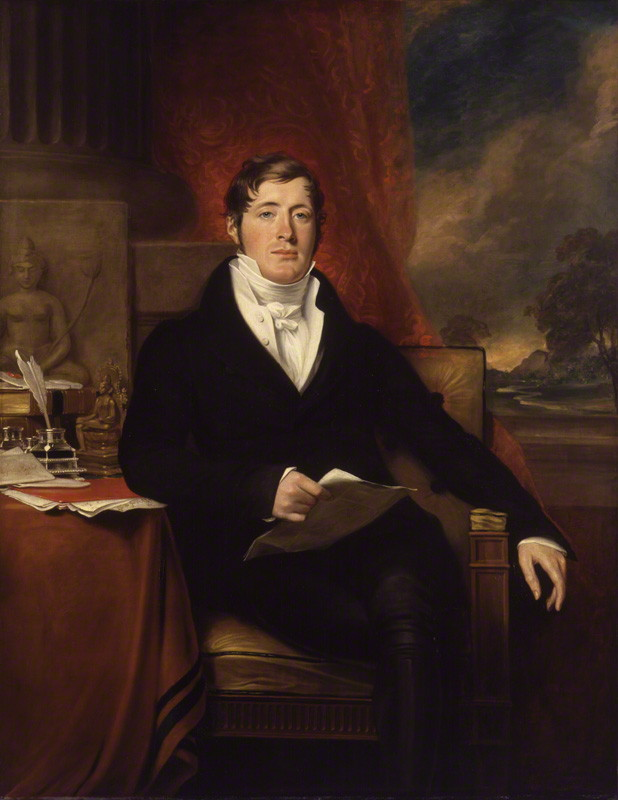
Portrait of Stamford Raffles by George Francis Joseph, 1817. Raffles was a driving force behind the creation of the zoo before his death in 1826.

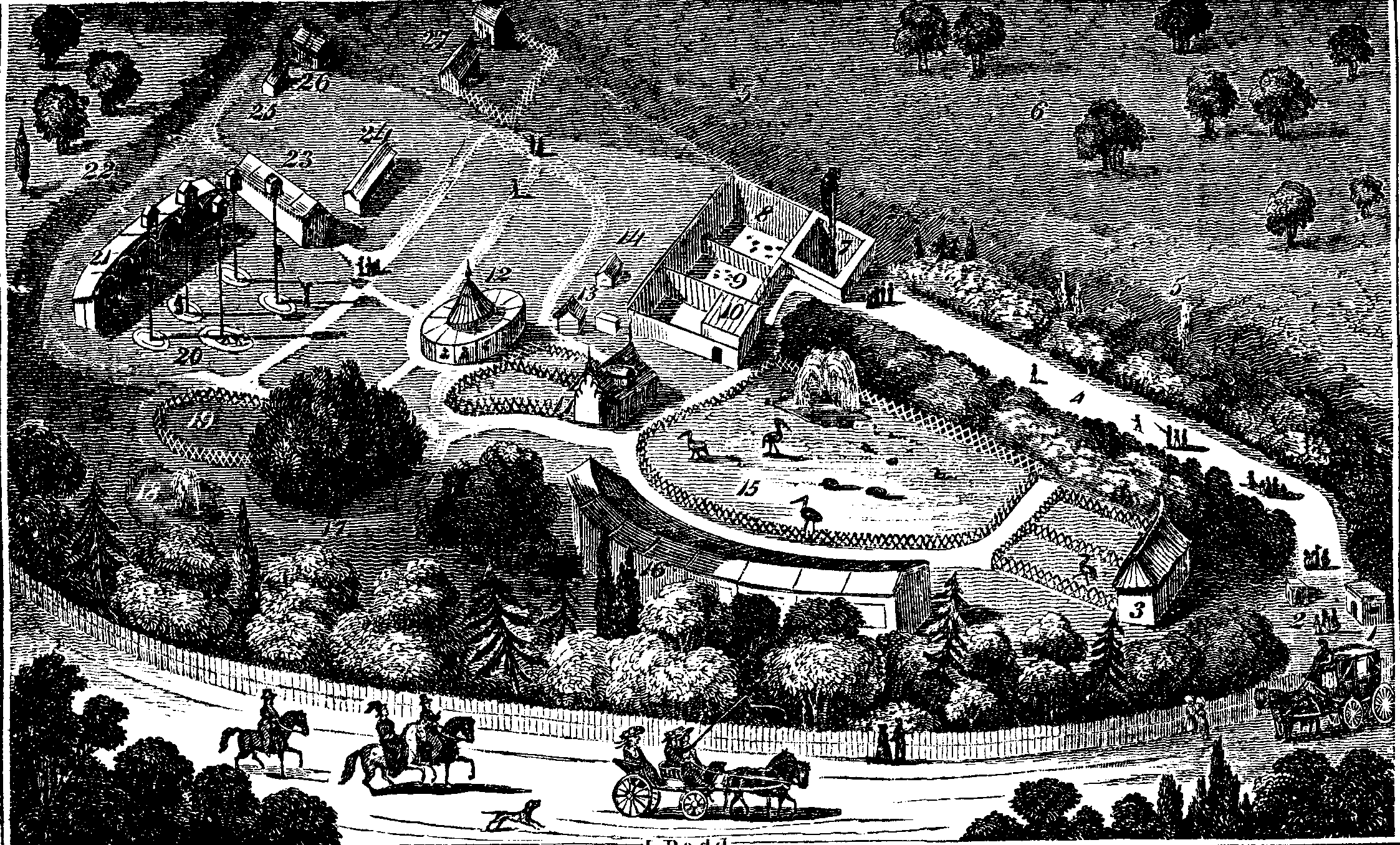
Bird's eye view drawing of the gardens of the Zoological Society, circa 1828

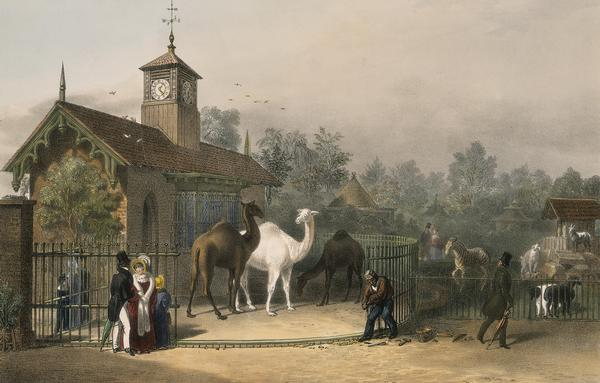
1835 painting of the camel house

The Zoological Society of London (ZSL) was established by Sir Stamford Raffles and Sir Humphry Davy in 1826, who obtained the land for the zoo and saw the plans before Raffles died of apoplexy later that year on 5 July, his birthday. After his death, Henry Petty-Fitzmaurice, 3rd Marquess of Lansdowne took over the project and supervised the building of the first animal houses. The zoo opened in April 1828 to fellows of the Society, providing access to species such as Arabian oryxes, greater kudus, orangutans and the now extinct quaggas and thylacines. The Society was granted a royal charter in 1829 by King George IV, and in 1847 the zoo opened to the public to aid funding.

It was believed that tropical animals could not survive outside in London's cold weather, so they were all kept indoors until 1902, when Peter Chalmers Mitchell was appointed secretary of the Society. He set about a major reorganisation of the buildings and enclosures of the zoo, bringing many of the animals out into the open, where many thrived. This was an idea inspired by the Hamburg Zoo, and led to newer designs for many of the buildings. Mitchell also envisaged a new 600-acre (240 ha) park to the north of London, and in 1926 Hall Farm, near to Whipsnade, was bought. In 1931, Whipsnade Wild Animal Park, the world's first open zoological park, opened. The first woman to be a curator at London Zoo was Evelyn Cheesman, in 1920.

=== Second World War 1939–1945 ===
After the start of the Second World War, London Zoo was closed multiple times for over a week, the first time being at 11:00 am on 3 September 1939, when all zoological places were closed by government order. Valuable animals were transferred to Whipsnade Zoo during the war for safety. On 27 September 1940, high explosive bombs damaged the Rodent house, the Civet house, the gardener's office, the propagating sheds, the North Gate and the Zebra house. In January 1941, the Camel House was also hit, and the aquarium could not open until May 1943 due to extensive bombing. No animals were harmed during the incidents, although a zebra, a female ass, and her foal escaped from the zoo during the bombings. For safety reasons, all venomous animals were killed at London Zoo. Throughout the war, members of the armed forces paid half price for entry, and the wounded entered free of charge.

=== Since 1946 ===
In 1962, 'Caroline', an Arabian oryx, was lent to Phoenix Zoo, Arizona, US, in the world's first international co-operative breeding programme. Today, the zoo participates in breeding programmes for over 130 species.

In the 1980s, London Zoo housed 8,000 animals of more than 900 species, and in the 1990s, the zoo possessed 7,000 animals of 850 species; the next biggest collection in Britain was Chester Zoo, with just under 3,500 animals. Many of the species in London Zoo could not be seen anywhere else in the country, such as the wombat, Tasmanian devil or long-nosed potoroo. Although this vast collection was part of the zoo's appeal, it may also have been one of the main causes of its financial problems. This contributed to the zoo being faced with closure in the 1980s. Due to the public change of attitude to animals kept in captivity and unsuitably cramped space, the zoo also suffered dwindling visitor numbers. However, when it was announced that London Zoo would close in 1991, a swell of public support in visitors and donations allowed the zoo to continue its work, attempt to balance its books and take on the huge task of restoring its buildings and creating environments more suitable for animal behaviour in the late 20th century. The BAFTA winning 1993 documentary series The Ark by Molly Dineen chronicled this period of time.

One benefit of the 'swell of public support' was the development of volunteer staff. Volunteers who give one day a week to assist the running of London Zoo, wearing red pullovers, are employed by both Education and Animal care.

During the COVID epidemic, which started in 2020, the zoo was closed from 21 March to 15 June 2020. This closure resulted in a "perilous financial position" for the zoo due to the loss of revenue.

The Snowdon Aviary was redeveloped as Monkey Valley, opening in 2022.

== Areas and attractions ==
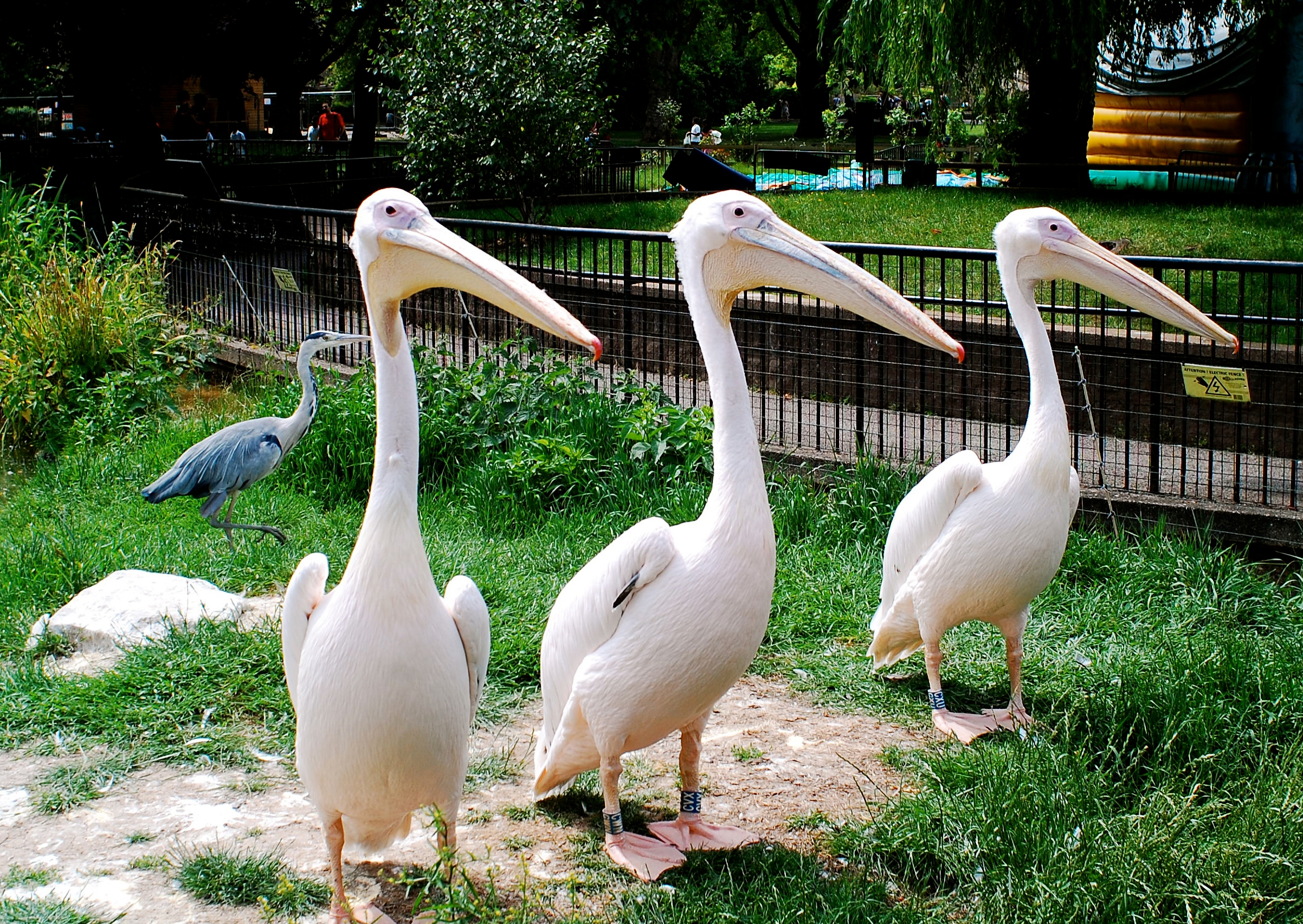
Three great white pelicans in their enclosure

The Zoo has many named areas and attractions. Several of them are available for hire outside the zoo's opening hours, including The Terrace, Penguin Beach, Ninos cove, Tiny Giants, Land of the Lions, Tiger Territory, and Attenborough Komodo Dragon House.

Group	Number of species	Number of individuals
Mammals	60	245
Birds	88	414
Reptiles	19	67
Amphibians	18	582
Fish	27	406
Invertebrates	171	6757
Total	383	8,469

=== Monkey Valley ===
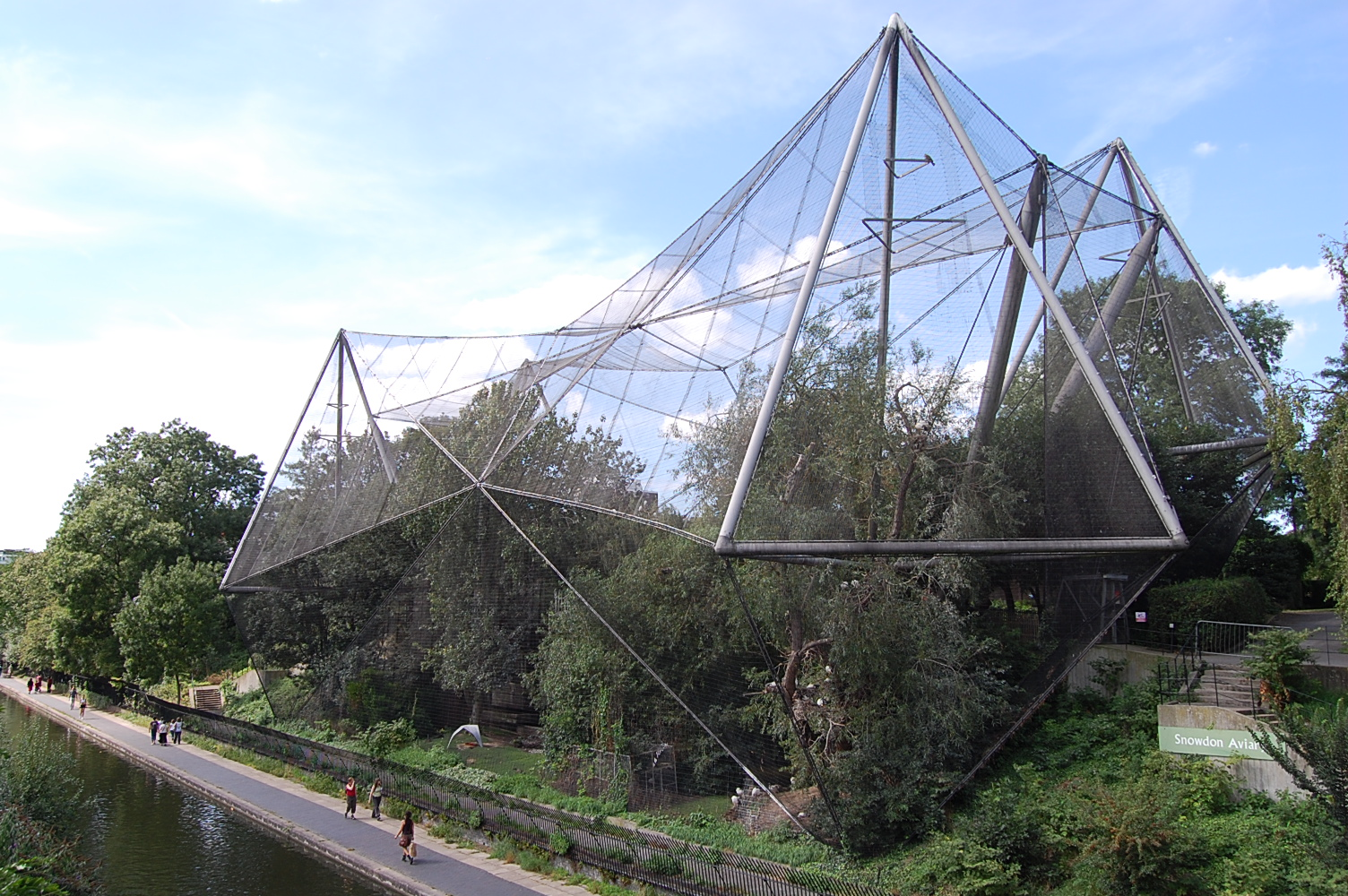
The Snowdon Aviary

The Snowdon Aviary was designed by Cedric Price, Frank Newby and Antony Armstrong-Jones, 1st Earl of Snowdon, built between 1962 and 1964, and opened in 1965. It was Britain's first public, walk-through aviary, and primarily housed shorebirds such as gulls and ibis. It is constructed with a pyramidal aluminium framework reaching 21 metres (69 feet) high. In 2021, the aviary was re-developed into a walkthrough primatarium called "Monkey Valley", which opened to the public in August 2022 and houses a troop of eastern black and white colobus monkeys. The structure has been a Grade II* listed building since 1998.

=== Land of the Lions ===
Land of the Lions is London Zoo's Asiatic lion enclosure, opened in 2016. It covers 2,500 square metres (27,000 sq ft), and is designed to resemble an Indian town on the edge of the Gir National Park, intended to demonstrate how the lion's natural habitat overlaps with local urban environments. Hanuman langurs, small Indian mongooses and Rüppell's vultures are also displayed in this area.

=== Tiger Territory ===
Tiger Territory is London Zoo's Sumatran tiger enclosure, designed by architect Michael Kozdon and officially opened by the Duke of Edinburgh in March 2013. The zoo currently houses two tigers: a male named Asim and a female named Gaysha who both arrived from Ree Park - Ebeltoft Safari.The enclosure is 2,500 square metres (27,000 square feet) in size and features authentic Indonesian plant life, as well as a net canopy of 3 millimetres (0.12 inches) steel cable supported by four metal poles.

=== The Casson Pavilion ===
The Casson Pavilion is one of the zoo's Grade II listed buildings and was designed by architect Sir Hugh Casson between 1962 and 1965. The building was originally built to house rhinos and elephants. However, after an accident in which a keeper was killed in 2001, the animals were relocated to Whipsnade Zoo, and since then, the building has housed camels and porcupines. At one point, it was also part of Tiger Territory when it housed bearded pigs, Malayan tapirs and pygmy hippos. It is now its own exhibit, known as The Cassons, and it houses a family of red river hogs and babirusas as well as a bachelor group of Philippine spotted deer.

=== Gorilla Kingdom ===
Opened by the Duke of Edinburgh in March 2007, Gorilla Kingdom consists of a moated island, home to a group of western lowland gorillas. The zoo currently holds seven gorillas: an adult male named Kiburi, two adult females named Mjukuu and Effie, a juvenile female named Alika (the daughter of Mjukuu and former silverback Kumbuka) born in December 2014, a juvenile male named Gernot (the son of Effie and former silverback Kumbuka) born in November 2015, a female infant named Juno born to mother Mjukuu on 17 January 2024 and a second female infant named Venus was born to mother Effie on 8 February 2024, just three and a half weeks after the first. The Gorilla Kingdom area also features smaller enclosures housing white-naped mangabeys, and Diana monkeys. The exhibit also features a walk-through aviary named 'Bird Forest' that houses pink pigeons, lilac-breasted rollers, violet turacos, madagascar crested ibis and Von der Decken's hornbill.

=== Into Africa ===
Into Africa is an Africa-themed area that opened in April 2006. Animals on display in this area include Chapman's zebras, common warthogs, okapis, common ostriches, giraffes, pygmy hippos, bat-eared foxes and African wild dogs. The Giraffe House at London Zoo, built in 1837, is the world's oldest zoo building still used for its original purpose. The Giraffe House has been designated as a Grade II listed building because of its historical and architectural significance.

=== Rainforest Life and Night Life ===
These exhibits occupy a shared building on the North side of the zoo. The building was originally opened as the Clore Pavilion for Small Mammals in 1967, then given an extensive facelift and renamed the Clore Rainforest Lookout in 2007. A further refurbishment in 2010 converted the upper level into Rainforest Life, a walk-through indoor exhibit for South American rainforest animals. Species exhibited here include Linnaeus's two-toed sloths, golden lion tamarins, red titi monkeys, Lac Alaotra bamboo lemurs, Goeldi's marmosets, black and rufous sengi, golden-headed lion tamarins, red-footed tortoises, Karoo round-eared sengi and Rodrigues flying foxes.

The lower level of the building, called Night Life, houses nocturnal animals. These include Mohol bushbabies, Senegal bushbabies, grey slender lorises, West African pottos, Malagasy giant rats, naked mole-rats, pygmy slow lorises, harvest mice, lesser hedgehog tenrecs and golden hamsters.

=== The Outback ===
The Mappin Terraces opened in 1913, and features an artificial rocky cliff made of concrete blocks for animal enrichment. This was the zoo's first major attempt at recreating natural environments without bars, influenced by European zoos such as Tierpark Hagenbeck, and many different species have been kept in this enclosure during its lifetime, including Himalayan brown bears, polar bears, American black bears, sloth bears, king penguins, Barbary sheep, mouflons, goats, kangaroos, leopards, and wild boar. The Mappin Terraces is currently an Australia-themed exhibit called "The Outback", housing emus and red-necked wallabies.

=== The former Aquarium ===
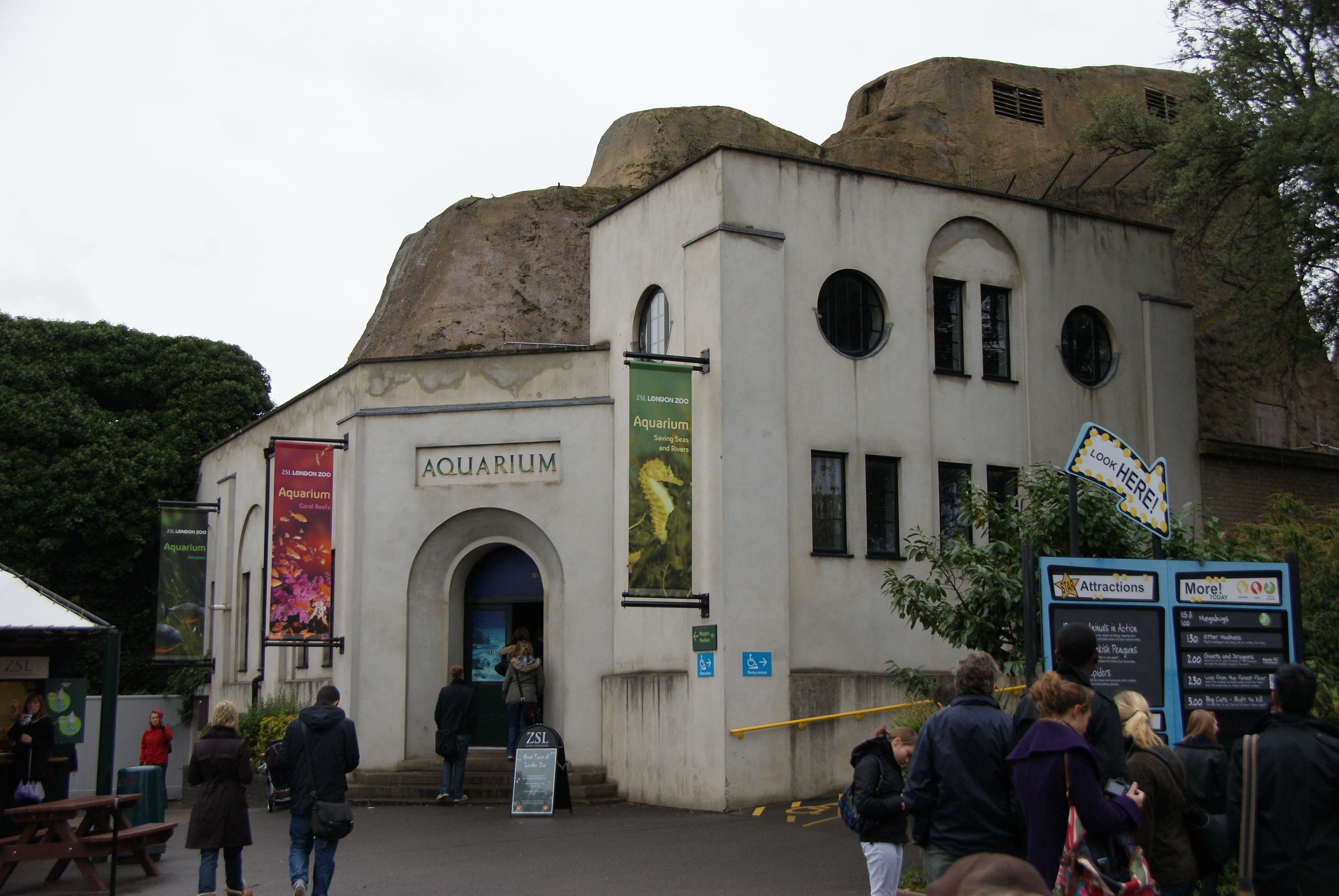
Aquarium

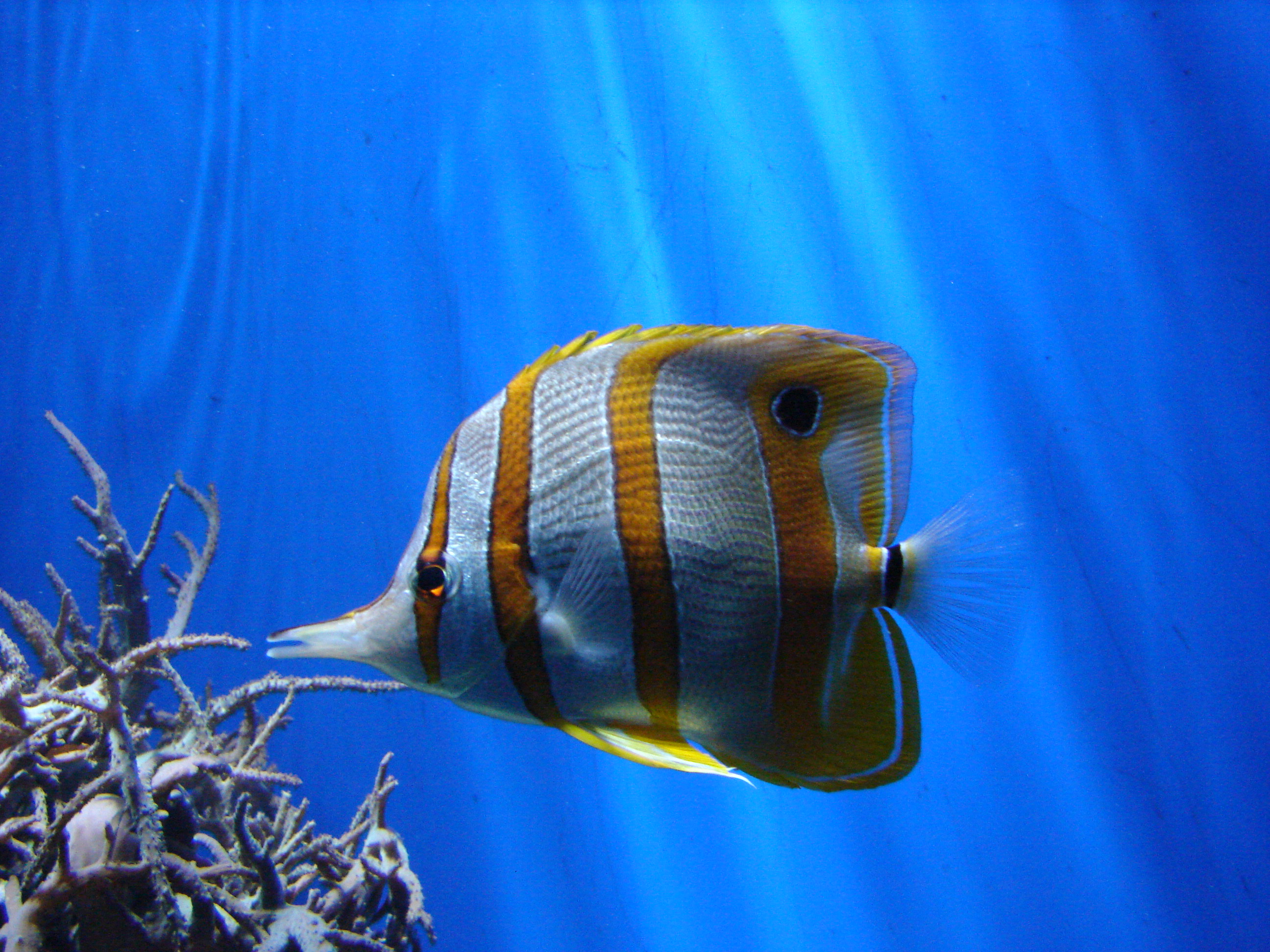
A copperband butterflyfish in the coral reef hall

There was an aquarium at the zoo from 1853 until 2019. The zoo's first aquarium was also the world's first public aquarium, and was created and stocked by Philip Henry Gosse who coined the word "aquarium", as a portmanteau of aquatic vivarium. In 1853 opened a building known as Fish House, while the most recent aquarium was built in 1921 next to and beneath the Mappin Terraces and was officially opened by King George V and his wife Queen Mary in April 1924. The collection in 1853 included 58 fish species and 200 invertebrate species.

The aquarium was separated into three halls, each home to different types of fish and other aquatic wildlife. The first hall primarily contained freshwater species such as rudds and European eels, as well as some saltwater species involved in various conservation projects and captive-breeding programmes, such as broad sea fans, uarus and seahorses. The second hall displayed various species of coral reef fish from around the world, such as clownfish, copperband butterflyfish and regal tangs, as well as real coral. The third hall housed species native to the Amazon River, including red-bellied piranhas, angelfish, arapaimas and ocellate river stingrays. In addition to the three halls, the aquarium also featured the "Big Fish Tank". This tank housed large fish species that were all former pets. They had to be rescued because their owners did not have the proper equipment or understanding to care for them.

The dedicated London Aquarium, unconnected with ZSL, opened in 1997. The Zoo's smaller aquarium closed on 22 October 2019; some of the aquatic creatures were moved to a new aquarium at Whipsnade Zoo, while others were set to be housed in a new corals exhibit in the Tiny Giants building in 2020.

=== Animal Adventure ===
Animal Adventure, formerly known as the Ambika Paul Children's Zoo, was established in 2009. It is a dedicated area for children, featuring playgrounds and a water fountain. It was built after a child who loved visiting the zoo with her family, Ambika Paul, died from cancer. Her parents donated £1,000,000 to the zoo to build a children's zoo in her honour. Many of the animals in Animal Adventure are domestic animals, such as llamas, alpacas, sheep, goats and rabbits, as well as mangalitsa pigs. Exotic species on display include Cape porcupines, white-nosed coatis, and meerkatss.

At approximately 6 am on Saturday, 23 December 2017, a large fire broke out at Animal Adventure. The fire was brought under control by 9:30 am after spreading to the cafe and shop on the premises. It is estimated that three-quarters of the cafe/shop suffered severe damage. A nine-year-old aardvark named Misha was pronounced dead, and four meerkats were declared unaccounted for and presumed dead. The zoo reopened on Christmas Eve.

=== The former Reptile House ===
One of London Zoo's most well-known buildings, the Reptile House opened in 1927 and was designed by Joan Beauchamp Procter and Sir Edward Guy Dawber. It housed several species of reptile, including Jamaican boa, Philippine crocodiles, Annam leaf turtles, Fiji banded iguanas, Northern caiman lizards, puff adders, king cobras and emerald tree boas. In December 2012, a refurbished amphibian section was opened to the public, displaying amphibians such as Chinese giant salamanders, axolotls, African bullfrogs, Lake Oku clawed frogs, White's tree frogs and various types of poison dart frog. A new Reptile House, titled "The Secret Life of Reptiles and Amphibians", opened in Easter 2024.

=== Giants of the Galápagos ===
Giants of the Galápagos was opened in 2009 to coincide with the 200th birthday of Charles Darwin, and is home to three female Galápagos giant tortoises named Dolly, Polly and Priscilla. It includes a large indoor area with a heated pond and underfloor heating, while the outdoor paddock has been designed to mimic the tortoise's natural environment and features two heated pools, one of which is a naturalistic clay wallow.

=== The Attenborough Komodo Dragon House ===
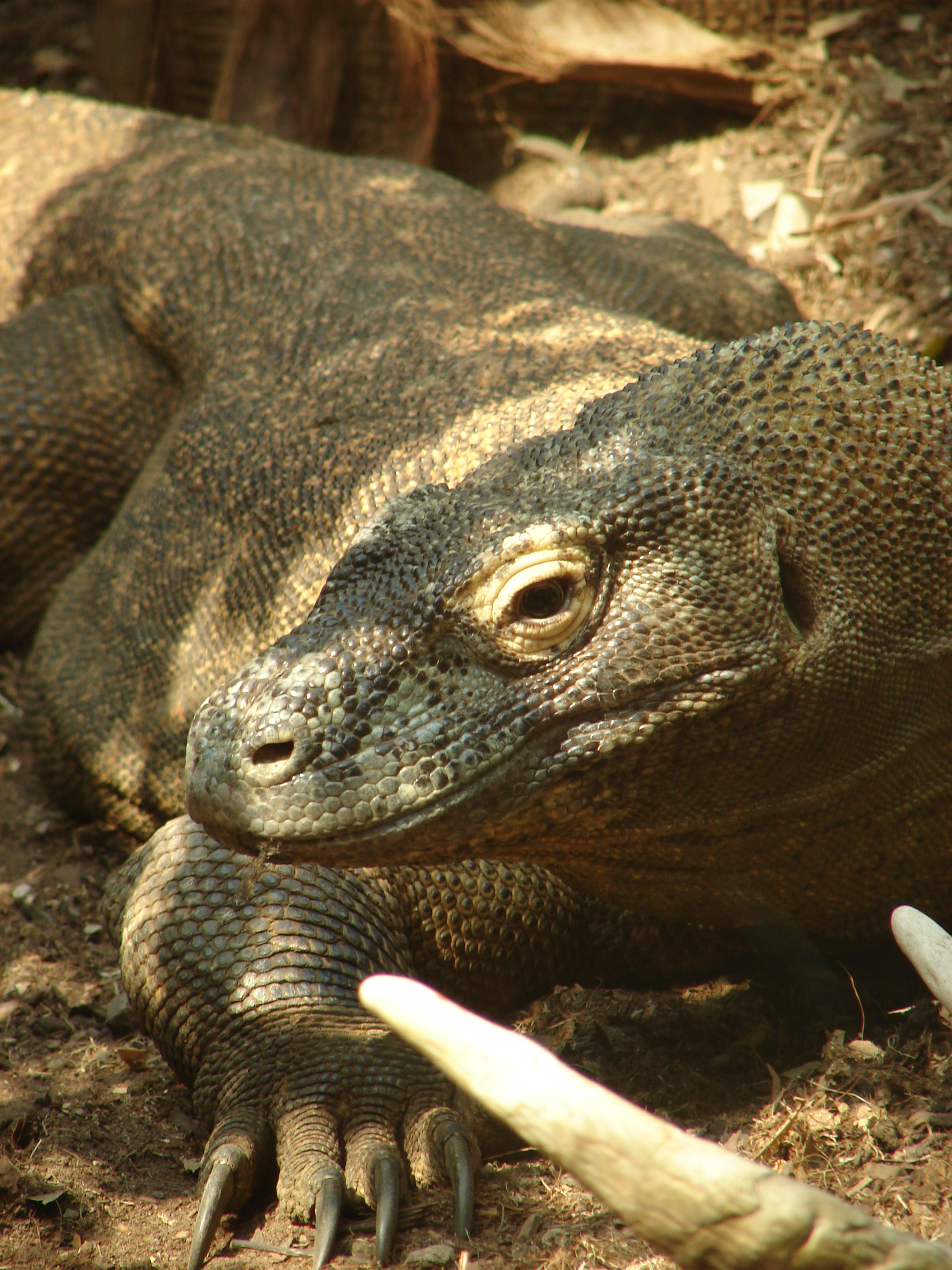
Raja, the male Komodo dragon

London Zoo's Komodo dragon enclosure was opened by Sir David Attenborough in July 2004. The zoo used to care for two Komodo dragons, a female named Rinka and a male named Raja. Raja was filmed in his exhibit for an action sequence in the 2012 James Bond film Skyfall. The exhibit is currently home to a female Komodo dragon named Khaleesi arrived from Paignton Zoo in 2023. The enclosure is designed to resemble the dragon's natural habitat of a dry river bed, and sounds of Indonesian birds are regularly played into the enclosure. The house also displays a Mindanao water monitor in a separate enclosure.

=== Tiny Giants ===
Tiny Giants, formerly called B.U.G.S., is an exhibit featuring invertebrates and fish. It is held in a building called The Millennium Conservation Centre, and the building displays over 160 species, including one of the United Kingdom's most endangered animals, the fen raft spider as well as western honey bees, leafcutter ants, emperor scorpions, Golden silk orb weavers, Madagascar orb weavers, Mexican redknee tarantulas, bird-eating spiders, desert locusts, moon jellyfish, partula snails and many others.

It also features a large coral reef aquarium with corals and over 200 reef fish. The Millennium Conservation Centre aims to be environmentally friendly, constructed from materials requiring little energy to produce, and generating its heating from the body heat of both the animals and visitors. In May 2015, an exhibit called "In With the Spiders" opened in the exhibit as Europe's first and only spider walkthrough exhibit. It houses Golden silk orb weavers and Madagascar orb weavers.

=== Penguin Beach ===
Penguin Beach opened on 26 May 2011 and houses Humboldt penguins. A single male Northern rockhopper penguin named Ricky also lived there until he was moved to Whipsnade Zoo in March 2017. The pool itself is the largest penguin pool containing penguins in an English zoo.

=== In with the Lemurs ===
Opened in March 2015, In with the Lemurs is a walk-through exhibit housing a group of ring-tailed lemurs, bokibokys, aye-ayes and grey mouse lemurs, with the latter two species living in a nocturnal section. The exhibit is designed to resemble a shrub forest in Madagascar, featuring plant life such as loquat and Chusan palm trees.

=== In with the Monkeys ===
Opened by comedians Noel Fielding and Julian Barratt of The Mighty Boosh in 2005, Meet the Monkeys is a walk-through enclosure that houses a breeding group of 8 black-capped squirrel monkeys. The exhibit has no roof, and there are no boundaries between the monkeys and the visitors. It is the southernmost enclosure in the zoo.

=== Butterfly Paradise ===
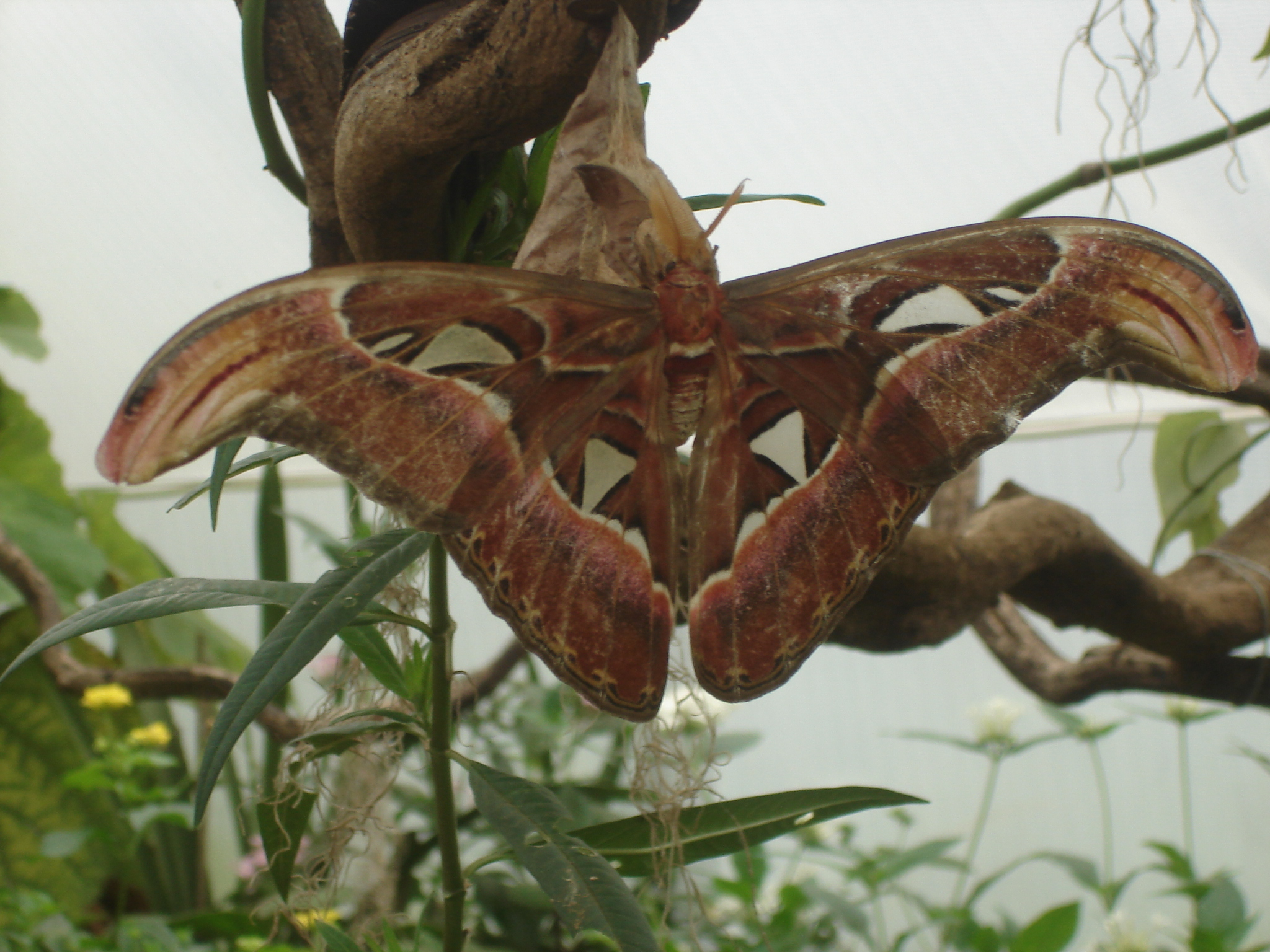
An atlas moth in Butterfly Paradise

Opened in May 2006, Butterfly Paradise houses several species of butterfly and moth from around the world, as well as plant species specially selected to provide nectar and breeding areas for the insects. Species on display include clipper butterflies, blue morpho butterflies, atlas moths, zebra longwings, glasswing butterflies and postman butterflies. The exhibit also features a caterpillar hatchery and a pupa display cabinet, where visitors can witness different types of pupae and the development of new butterflies.

=== Bird Safari ===
The Bird Safari opened in 2005 as a redevelopment of the old stork and ostrich house, replacing enclosures that were outdated by modern zoo-keeping standards. It is a walk-through exhibit housing various species of birds including waldrapp ibises, Abdim's storks, great arguses, red-crested turacos, and scarlet ibises.

=== Blackburn Pavilion ===
The Blackburn Pavilion is a rainforest-themed tropical bird aviary that opened in March 2008 as a refurbishment of the zoo's outdated birdhouse. It rejuvenated the birdhouse by adding a walk-through element. The building was originally constructed in 1883 as a reptile house. The pavilion houses roughly 50 different species of exotic rainforest birds, including blue-crowned laughingthrushes, collared trogons, Socorro doves, red-crested turacos, Mindoro bleeding-heart doves and crested partridges. Outside the entrance is one of the pavilion's prominent features, a large elaborate clock designed by Tim Hunkin. It gives a bird-themed display every thirty minutes throughout the day.

=== Gibbon Habitat ===
The Gibbon Habitat is an enclosure for the zoo's two gibbons Jimmy and Yoda which opened in 2017. It has two viewing points: one at ground level near the camel paddock and one at a higher level from Tiger Territory. The father and son are a Northern white-cheeked gibbon and a hybrid species. They were initially housed in the Gorilla Kingdom.

=== Otters and Dwarf Mongoose ===
The Otters and Dwarf Mongoose exhibit previously known as "Happy Families", consists of two enclosures. One enclosure is home to Asian small-clawed otters, while the other enclosure houses dwarf mongooses. This area was previously home to meerkats that have since moved to another part of the zoo. There is also a third enclosure, housing Kirk's dik-diks. The exhibit was initially designed to accommodate meerkats, otters, European forest reindeers and Goeldi's monkeys. However, the reindeer (who lived in the dik-dik paddock) were relocated to Whipsnade Zoo, and the monkeys were transferred to the zoo's Rainforest Life building.

=== Super Species Live ===
Super Species Live is the zoo's flying bird demonstration though it does include mammals such as a pair of large hairy armadillos a group of ferrets. The show features several species of birds including, burrowing owls, red-and-green macaws, a red-billed blue magpie, a tawny owl, a spectacled owl, a buzzard, a striated caracara, a harris hawk and a red-tailed black cockatoo named Frankie who was confiscated from the illegal wildlife trade. The show previously featured a serval named Xena, South American coatis, meerkats and a red-legged seriema.

=== Three Island Pond ===
Three Island Pond was only granted exhibit status in 2021. This artificially shaped pond is named after the three islands within it. It is separated into two enclosures: one houses greater flamingoes, and the other is home to Eastern white pelicans.

=== Others ===
Other notable animals in London Zoo's collection include Bactrian camels, military macaws, hyacinth macaws, blue-throated macaws and Darwin's frogs.

The zoo's north bank, north of the canal, formerly housed the bird incubation and rearing unit. The area is currently undeveloped.

An initiative to showcase veterinary science at the Zoo was announced in 2026. It will allow visitors to observe dolphin post-mortem examinations and other veterinary procedures. It is part of a £20 million wildlife health centre being developed by the ZSL, which will support animal care, disease monitoring, and conservation efforts.

== Subsidised entry ==
London Zoo established a Community Access Scheme in 2019 to provide 100,000 subsidised tickets to charities and groups assisting low-income families, older individuals, and people with disabilities. The scheme is intended to run until 2023. This started with a grant from the National Lottery Heritage Fund to convert the Snowdon Aviary to a colobus monkey enclosure. The scheme was successful and was later extended to allow anyone who received certain benefits to buy tickets for £3, about a tenth of the full price, leading to visits by thousands of families, and long queues which were controlled by requiring pre-booking and capping numbers. Some visitors who were not receiving benefits complained about the crowds.

As of February 2023 the Zoo was trying to ensure that the £3 tickets were not cannibalising demand for full-price tickets. However, they intended to maintain the £3 scheme if further funding became available. The director general of the Zoological Society of London described the result of the scheme as a "brilliant development", despite the queues and challenges.

== Notable past animals ==
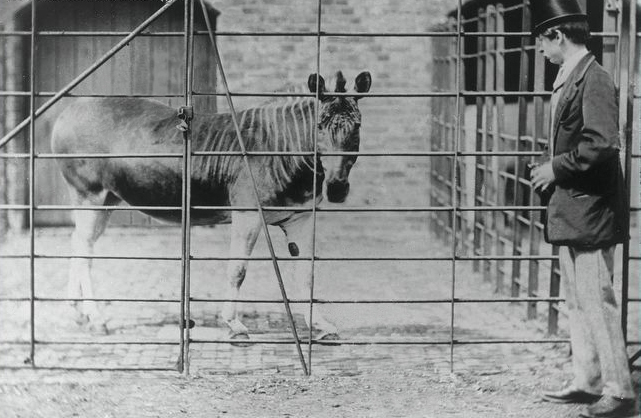
The only photographs taken of a living quagga were taken of a mare at London Zoo between 1864 and 1870.

Throughout its history, the zoo has had many well-known residents. Those individuals could have been scientifically important or simply beloved by the public. Old Martin was a large grizzly bear, the first in Britain, moved to the zoo with many other animals from the Royal Menagerie, Tower of London when it was closed in 1832. In the late 1830s, the zoo housed a female orangutan named Jenny who was dressed in human clothing and learned to drink tea. The first of her species at the zoo, she is remembered for her meeting with Charles Darwin, who after doing so wrote no man could "boast of his proud preeminence".

The zoo was home to the only living quagga ever to be photographed before the species became extinct in the wild due to hunting in southern Africa in about 1870. Other now extinct species the zoo once held were the thylacine, the Falkland Islands Wolf, a pair of pink headed ducks, some Passenger pigeons, the Bubal hartebeest, the Syrian wild ass, the Northern Sumatran rhinoceros, the Javan tiger, the Schomburgk's deer, the Pinta Island tortoise, the Caspian tiger, the Glaucous macaw, as well as the endlings of the norfolk kaka, the Partula turgida snail, and the Santa Lucian Pilorie.

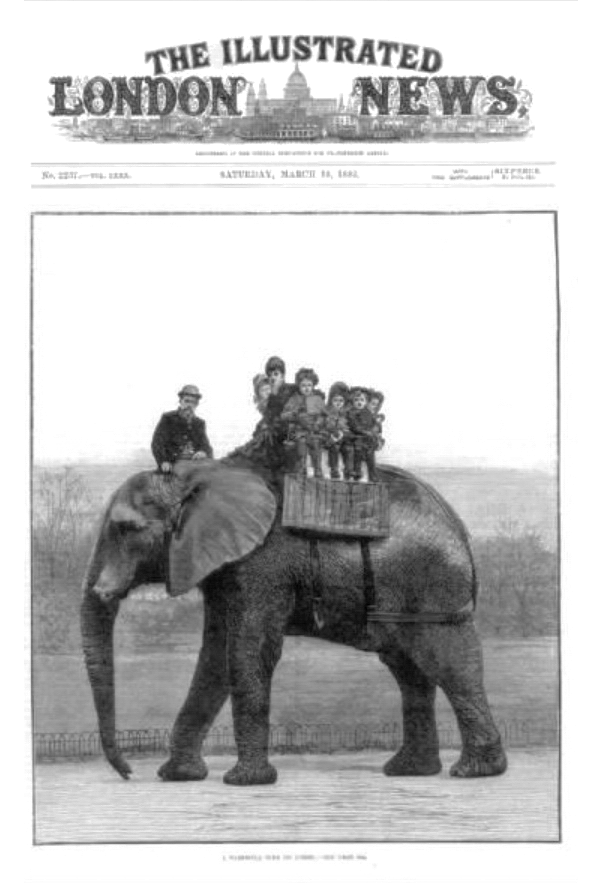
Jumbo giving a ride to children at the zoo in The Illustrated London News, 1882

Obaysch was the first hippopotamus to be seen in Europe since the Roman Empire and the first in England since prehistoric times. The hippo arrived at London Zoo in May 1850 as a gift from the Ottoman Viceroy of Egypt in exchange for some greyhounds and deerhounds. Obaysch led to a doubling of the zoo's visitors that year.

In 1865, Jumbo, the largest elephant known at the time, was transferred to the zoo from Jardin des Plantes in Paris. His name, possibly from Jambo, Swahili for hello, became an epithet for anything of large size, such as Boeing's 747 Jumbo jet. Jumbo became a crowd favourite due to his size, and would give rides to children on his back, including those of Queen Victoria. The sale of Jumbo sent the citizens of London into a panic, and 100,000 schoolchildren wrote to the Queen begging her to stop the sale. He was sold to Phineas Barnum's circus, the Barnum & Bailey Circus, in 1882, where he was later crushed by a locomotive and killed.

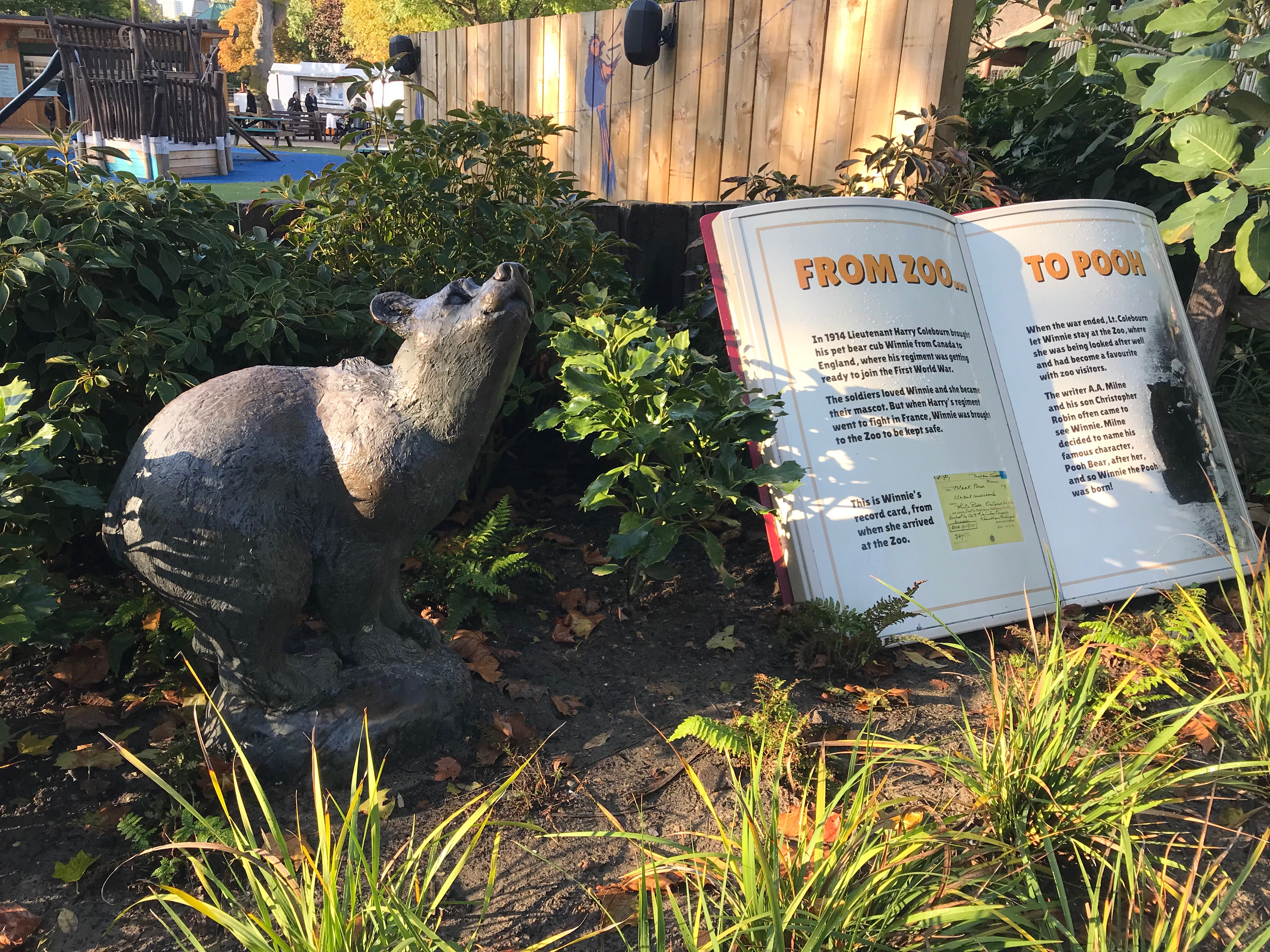
This sculpture at the zoo marks where A. A. Milne took his son Christopher Robin to see the amiable bear Winnipeg that inspired Milne to write Winnie-the-Pooh.

Winnipeg the Bear (or Winnie) was an American black bear given to the zoo in 1914 by a Canadian lieutenant, Harry Colebourn. A. A. Milne visited with his son Christopher Robin, and the boy was so enamoured with the bear Milne wrote the famous series of books for him entitled Winnie-the-Pooh. A 2004 film, A Bear Named Winnie, is based on the story of Winnie the bear, with Michael Fassbender playing Harry Colebourn.

Mo Koundje ('Mok'), a western lowland gorilla, was purchased by the zoo in 1932. A new gorilla house was designed for him by Berthold Lubetkin. Mok died of Bright's disease in 1938. His skeleton and skin were purchased by Leeds Museums and Galleries and are on display in Leeds, UK at Leeds City Museum and Leeds Discovery Centre.

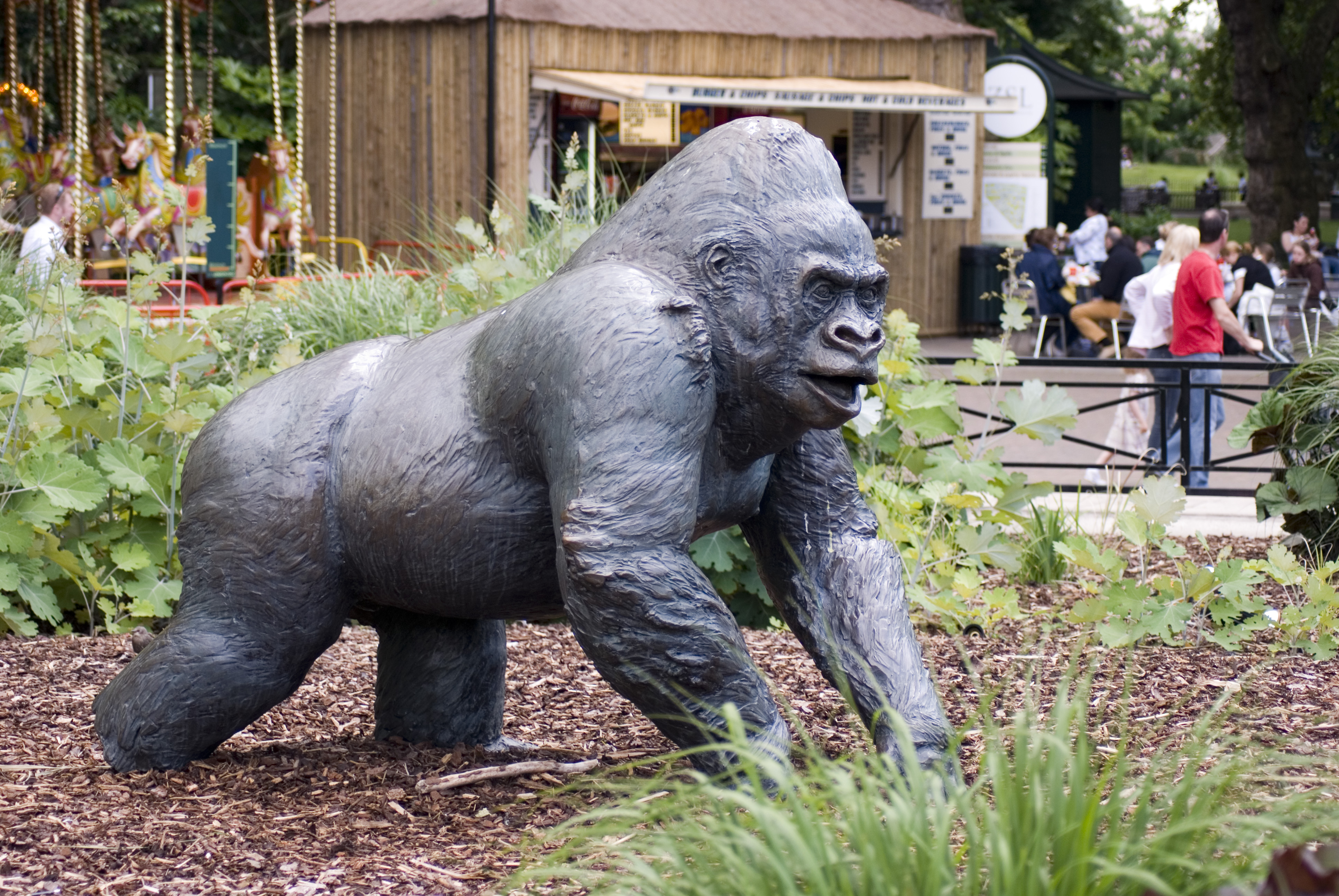
A bronze statue of Guy in Barclay Court

Guy, a western lowland gorilla, arrived at the zoo on Guy Fawkes Night (hence the name) 1947 from Paris Zoo and lived at the zoo until he died in 1978. Over his 32-year life, he became one of the zoo's best-loved residents. After years of trying to find a mate, in 1969 five-year-old Lomie arrived from Chessington Zoo. They were kept separated for a year to adjust to each other until they were finally united. Although they got on well together, they never produced any offspring. In 1982 Guy was commemorated by a bronze statue in Barclay Court, sculpted by William Timym.

Dumbo (born 1948) was a female Indian elephant who resided at London Zoo during the 1950s and was renowned for her fondness for sweets. Her parents were killed by hunters, and she was flown from India to London, where she spent her adult life giving rides to the children. Dumbo was named after the eponymous Disney character because she was the first elephant to travel by aeroplane. In 1958, she was transferred to Moscow Zoo in return for four endangered snow leopards. At some point between 1962 and 1971, Dumbo was acquired by circus performer Dolly Jacobs, but by 1978 she had been sold to Hollywood circus producer Paul V. Kaye and was living in California with three other elephants.

On 27 November 1949, Brumas became the first polar bear to be successfully bred at the zoo, and immediately became a major attraction with the public. This led to the zoo's annual attendance to rise to over 3 million in 1950—a figure that has yet to be topped. Despite being a female bear, the press mistakenly reported her as a 'he', and this error was not corrected, leading the public to believe the bear was a male. Eighteen years later, on 1 December 1967, the zoo welcomed its second polar bear cub, a male. He was named Pipaluk (a Greenlandic Inuit feminine given name meaning little one or sweet little thing) but, in 1985, had to leave the zoo when the Mappin Terraces closed.

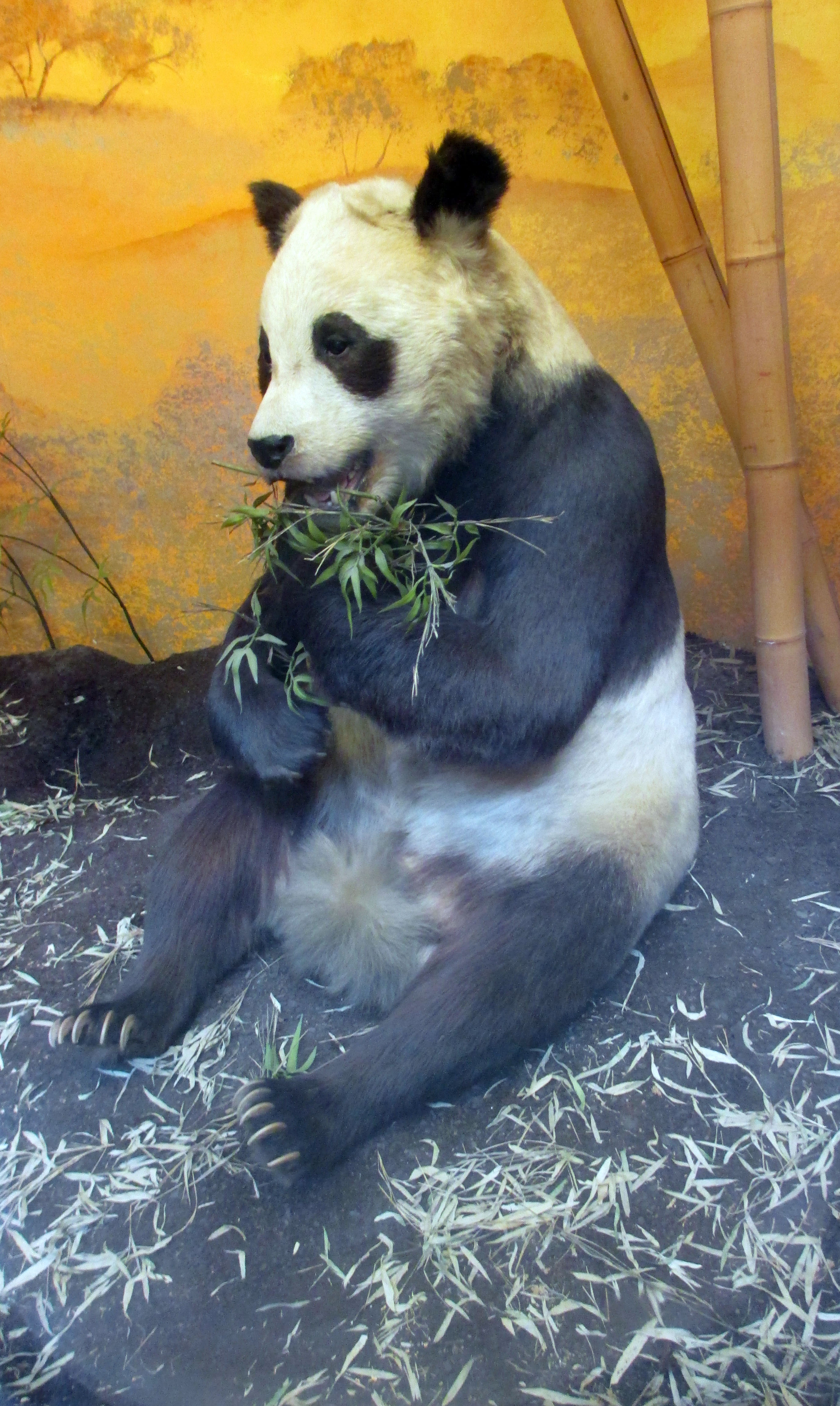
Stuffed remains of Chi Chi at the Natural History Museum in London

One of the zoo's most famous giant pandas, Chi Chi, arrived in 1958. Although originally destined for an American zoo, Washington, D.C., had ceased all trade with communist China, and so Chi Chi was refused entry to the United States. In the interests of conservation, ZSL had stated they would not encourage the collection of wild pandas. However, when it was pointed out that Chi Chi had already been collected, her purchase was approved, and she immediately became the star attraction at London Zoo. As the only giant panda in the West, she was the inspiration for Sir Peter Scott's design for the World Wildlife Fund logo. In July 1972, Chi Chi died and was publicly mourned. The zoo's last giant panda was Ming Ming. She arrived in 1991 on a breeding loan from China. After unsuccessful breeding attempts with Berlin's Zoo giant panda Bao Bao, it was decided that Ming Ming should return to China. As a result, London Zoo has been without a giant panda since the end of October 1994. Zoo staff later suggested that Chinese zookeepers knew that she was infertile and lent her in order to hide how much more advanced Western husbandry techniques were compared to theirs.

On 31 January 1996, the last known Partula turgida land snail named "Turgi" died in his habitat. For four days in late August 2005, the zoo ran an exhibit entitled the Human zoo, which put eight humans on display in the Mappin Terraces. The exhibit aimed to demonstrate the basic nature of man as an animal and examine our impact on the animal kingdom.

== Architecture ==
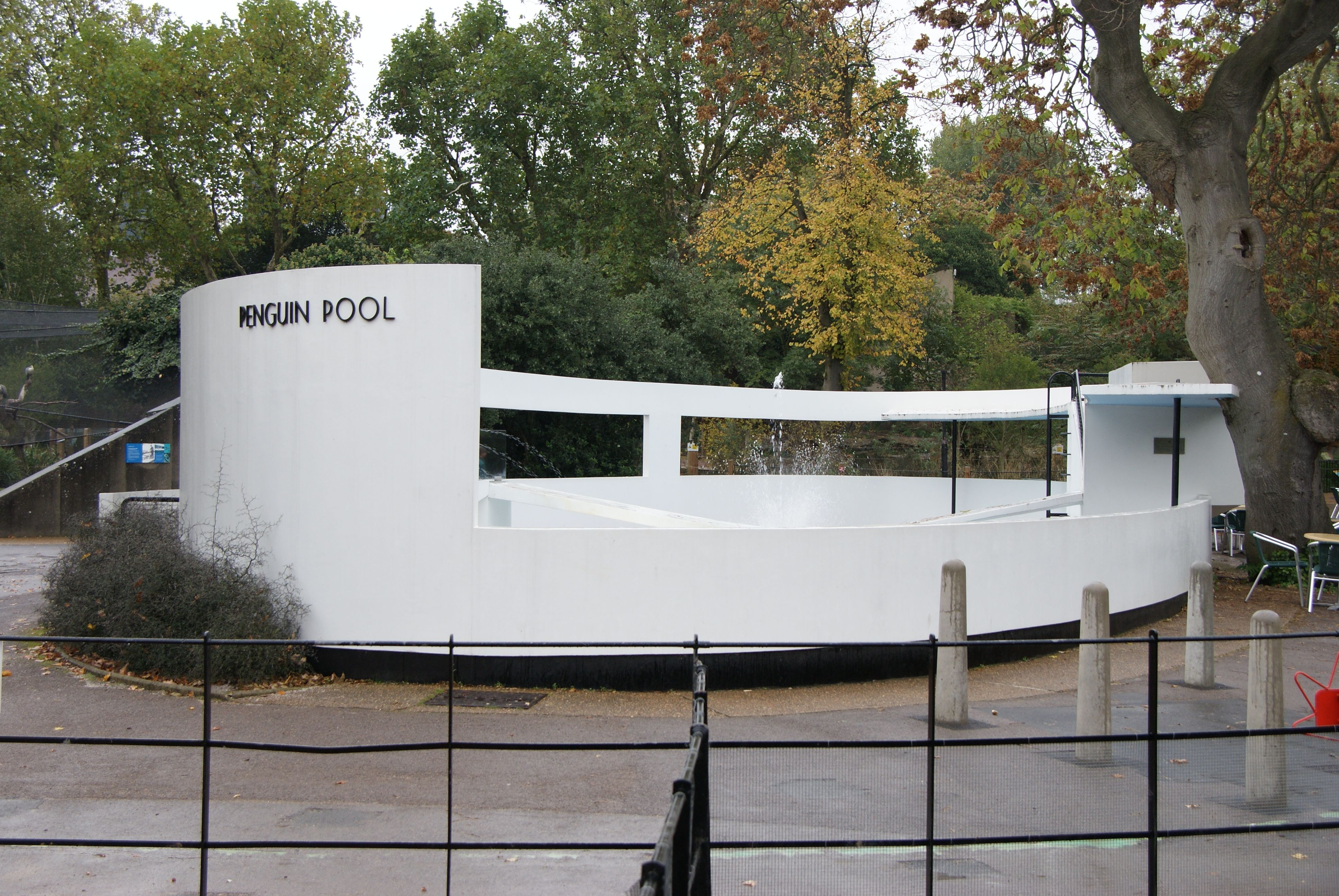
Penguin Pool, a Grade I listed building

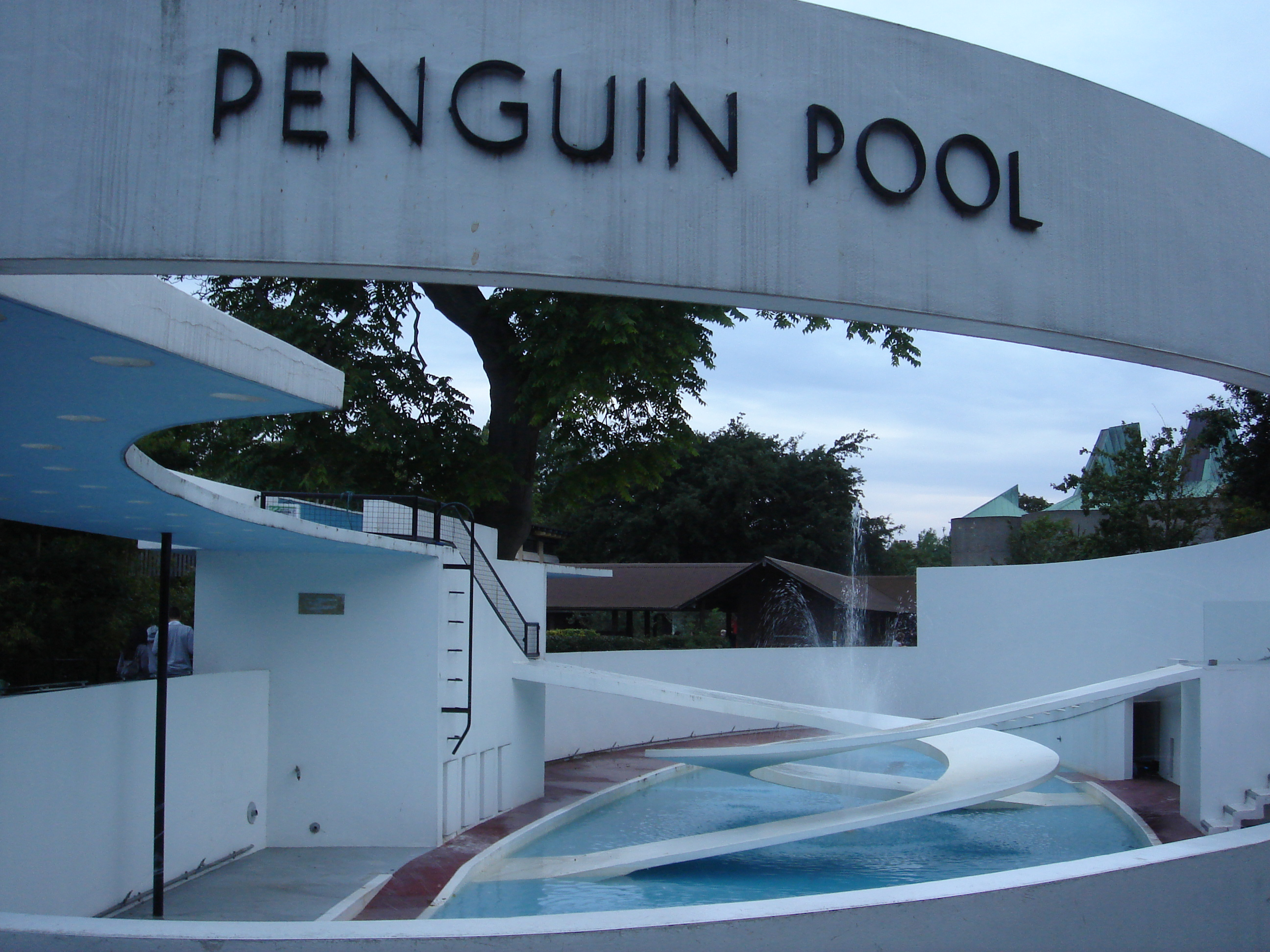
Penguin Pool

Since its earliest days, the zoo has prided itself on appointing leading architects to design its buildings. Today, it holds two Grade I, two Grade II* and ten Grade II listed structures.

The initial grounds were laid out in 1828 by Decimus Burton, the zoo's first official architect from 1826 to 1841, made famous for his work on the London Colosseum and Marble Arch. Burton's work began with the Clock Tower in 1828 above what was then the llama house, which today is the first aid kiosk. In 1830, the East Tunnel, which linked the north and south parts of the zoo together for the first time, was completed, which also acted as a bomb shelter during the Second World War. Burton concluded his work in 1837 with the Giraffe House, which, due to its functional design, still remains in use as the zoo's giraffe enclosure in the Into Africa exhibit.

The earliest surviving exhibit is the Ravens' Cage, an ornate ironwork aviary now retained as a monument. It was installed in 1829, soon after the zoo first opened. Its location on the grounds has changed over time, and several refurbishments have been required due to weather damage.

The Eastern Aviary, along the eastern boundary, currently holds parrots and birds of prey. It was built in 1863 with a hooped tubular steel frame. In 1989, further renovations were carried out on the exhibit using "invisible" wire.

The Stork and Ostrich House, built in 1896, can still be seen as holding pens behind the current Bird Safari exhibit. Victorian structures that have been demolished over time included the Lion House, Monkey House, Carnivore Terrace, and Elephant and Rhino House.

After Burton, Sir Peter Chalmers Mitchell and John James Joass were appointed to design the Mappin Terraces. Completed in 1914, the Mappin Terraces imitates a mountain landscape to provide a naturalistic habitat for bears and other mountain wildlife. In 1933 the Round House, designed by Berthold Lubetkin's Tecton Architectural Group to house gorillas, was one of the first modernist style buildings to be built in Britain. The following year the Penguin Pool also designed by Tecton, was opened; both now grade I listed. The Modernist dual concrete spiral ramps of the Penguin Pool have made it famous as a piece of modern architecture, but in 2004 the African penguins were moved out of the pool permanently following 'bumblefoot' infections in the birds caused by micro-abrasions from walking on the concrete.

The Snowdon Aviary, built-in 1964 by Cedric Price, Lord Snowdon and Frank Newby, made pioneering use of aluminium and tension for support. A year later, the Casson Pavilion, designed by Sir Hugh Casson and Neville Conder, was opened as an elephant and rhinoceros house. The Pavilion was commissioned "to display these massive animals in the most dramatic way" and designed to evoke a herd of elephants gathered around a watering hole.

Many of these buildings are available on a private hire basis for events, as well as a number of the animal houses. The profits from the use of spaces at the zoo are re-invested directly back into the society.

Listed structures in London Zoo
Name	Type	Architect	Completed	Grade	Date designated	Entry number
Gorilla House	Former animal house	Berthold Lubetkin and the Tecton Group with Ove Arup	1932–33	I	14 Sep 1970	1357402
Penguin Pool	Former penguin pool	Berthold Lubetkin and the Tecton Group with Ove Arup	1936	I	14 Sep 1970	1225665
Elephant and Rhinoceros Pavilion	Animal house	Sir Hugh Casson and Neville Conder	1962–1965	II*	12 June 1998	1323694
Snowdon Aviary	Aviary	Cedric Price, Frank Newby and Anthony Armstrong-Jones	1962–1965	II*	12 June 1998	1323695
Raven Cage	Former aviary	Decimus Burton	c. 1827	II	5 February 1970	1066049
The Clock Tower	Clock tower above former llama house	Decimus Burton	1830–1831	II	5 February 1970	1066050
Giraffe and Hippopotamus House	Animal house	Decimus Burton	c. 1836	II	5 February 1970	1357403
East Tunnel Beneath Roadway of Outer Circle	Pedestrian tunnel	Decimus Burton	c. 1829	II	5 February 1970	1266279
North Entrance Gate, Keepers Office, Storage Kiosk and Canopy	Former gatekeeper's office and kiosk	Berthold Lubetkin and the Tecton Group	1936–37	II	1 December 1987	1066051
The Mappin Terraces and Mappin Café	Animal house and café	John James Joass	1914 (terraces) and 1927 (café)	II	21 February 1989	1237587
West Footbridge	Pedestrian bridge	Sir Hugh Casson and Neville Conder	1960–61	II	29 May 1998	1119765
Footbridge to West of Broad Walk Footbridge	Pedestrian bridge	Sir John Fowler	c. 1865	II	18 October 1990	1248426
War Memorial	Memorial	John James Joass	1919	II	29 September 2016	1434655
K3 Type Telephone Kiosk	Telephone kiosk	Giles Gilbert Scott	1929	II	6 August 1986	1225640

== In popular culture ==
=== In film and television ===
Harry Potter with a Burmese python in the Reptile House

Audio description of London Zoo by Andrew Sachs

Many films and television programmes have used London Zoo as a location for filming.

- The Zoo and its Aquarium appear in Alfred Hitchcock's 1936 film Sabotage.
- In 1947, Carol Reed took his film crew and actors Ralph Richardson, Michèle Morgan and Bobby Henrey to London Zoo to film location scenes there for The Fallen Idol (released in 1948). Scenes were filmed inside the lion house, the seal house, and on the Mappin Terraces. Today, the scenes provide a historical view of what the zoo looked like in the immediate post-war years.
- A scene from the film The Pumpkin Eater (1964) with Anne Bancroft and James Mason was also set at the zoo.
- In 1967, part of Dudley Moore and Peter Cook's movie Bedazzled was filmed at the zoo.
- During An American Werewolf in London (1981), the lead character David Kessler (played by David Naughton) woke up naked in the wolves' enclosure. Several other animals are also visible, and the old caged enclosures of the tigers and apes are clearly visible.
- Part of the film Turtle Diary (1985), based on the novel by Russell Hoban and starring Ben Kingsley and Glenda Jackson, was also filmed here; the film follows a plan to help two of the turtles escape from the zoo.
- In the final scene from the film Withnail and I (1987), a sad Withnail is shown standing in the pouring rain next to the former wolf enclosure, declaiming the speech What a piece of work is a man from Hamlet.
- In 2000, the Burmese python scene from the film Harry Potter and the Philosopher's Stone (2001) was filmed at the zoo's Reptile House. In reality, the tank shown is typically home to smaller reptile species. A plaque beside the enclosure commemorates the event.

== In literature ==
=== In fiction ===
- In Bram Stoker's Dracula (1897), Dracula visits the London Zoo, after which a Norwegian wolf named Berserker escapes the zoo and frightens Lucy and her mother.
- The Anglo American author Bill Broun's Night of the Animals (2016) follows a homeless protagonist who releases animals from the London Zoo, causing a great disturbance across London.

=== In poetry ===
- British Poet Laureate Simon Armitage wrote the poem "The Moon and the Zoo" (2026), celebrating wildlife and the responsibility to protect it. The poem imagines the moon as a "nocturnal zookeeper" of the London Zoo.
