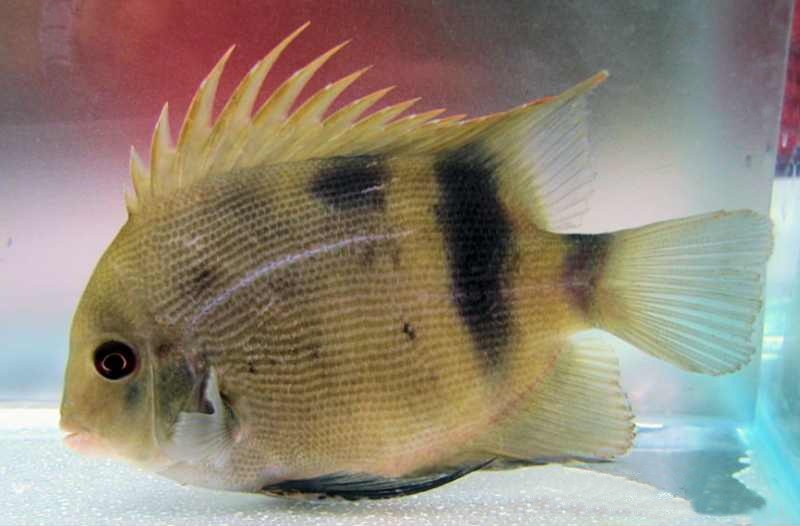

Conservation status
- Vulnerable (IUCN 3.1)

Scientific classification
- Kingdom: Animalia
- Phylum: Chordata
- Class: Actinopterygii
- Order: Cichliformes
- Family: Cichlidae
- Genus: Uaru
- Species: U. fernandezyepezi

Binomial name
- Uaru fernandezyepezi Stawikowski, 1989

= Uaru fernandezyepezi =

Species of fish

Uaru fernandezyepezi is a species of cichlid native to South America where it is found in rivers of the Orinoco River basin. This species can reach a length of 24 centimetres (9.4 in) TL. It is also found in the aquarium trade.

== Status ==
This species is considered vulnerable by the IUCN. Threats come from mining and related activities within the Orinoco Mining Arc in Venezuela. While the number of mature individuals and the population trend is unknown, the population is considered severely fragmented, and the latest assessment in 2020 found a continuing decline of mature individuals.

== See also ==
- Uaru
- Cichlid
- List of freshwater aquarium fish species
