= Harry Colebourn =

Canadian veterinarian and soldier

Harry D. Colebourn
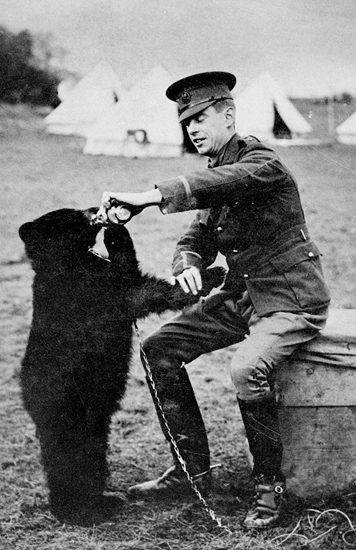
- Colebourn and Winnie on Salisbury Plain in 1914
- Born: 12 April 1887; Birmingham, England
- Died: 24 September 1947 (aged 60); Winnipeg, Manitoba, Canada
- Burial place: Brookside Cemetery
- Education: Ontario Veterinary College
- Military career
- Allegiance: Canada
- Rank: Major
- Unit: Royal Canadian Army Veterinary Corps
- Known for: Inspiring the creation of Winnie-the-Pooh

Harry D. Colebourn (April 12, 1887 – September 24, 1947) was a Canadian veterinarian and officer with the Royal Canadian Army Veterinary Corps best known for donating a bear cub named "Winnie" (short for "Winnipeg") to London Zoo. Winnie later inspired the creation of A. A. Milne's famous children's book character Winnie-the-Pooh.

== Early life ==
Harry Colebourn was born in Birmingham, England and emigrated to Canada when he was 18. He attended the Ontario Veterinary College, then located in Toronto, Ontario, receiving his degree in veterinary surgery in 1911, and moved west to Winnipeg, Manitoba.

== Winnie and World War I ==
As he was heading across Canada by train to the training camp at Valcartier, Quebec where he was to embark for overseas duty during World War I, Colebourn came across a hunter in White River, Ontario who had a female black bear cub for sale, having killed the cub's mother. Colebourn purchased the cub for $20, named her "Winnie" after his adopted home town, and took her across the Atlantic with him to Salisbury Plain, where she became an unofficial mascot of the Fort Garry Horse, a militia cavalry regiment. Colebourn himself was a member of the Royal Canadian Army Veterinary Corps, attached to the Fort Garry Horse as a veterinarian. While Colebourn served three years in France, attaining the rank of major, he kept Winnie at the London Zoo to which he eventually donated her.

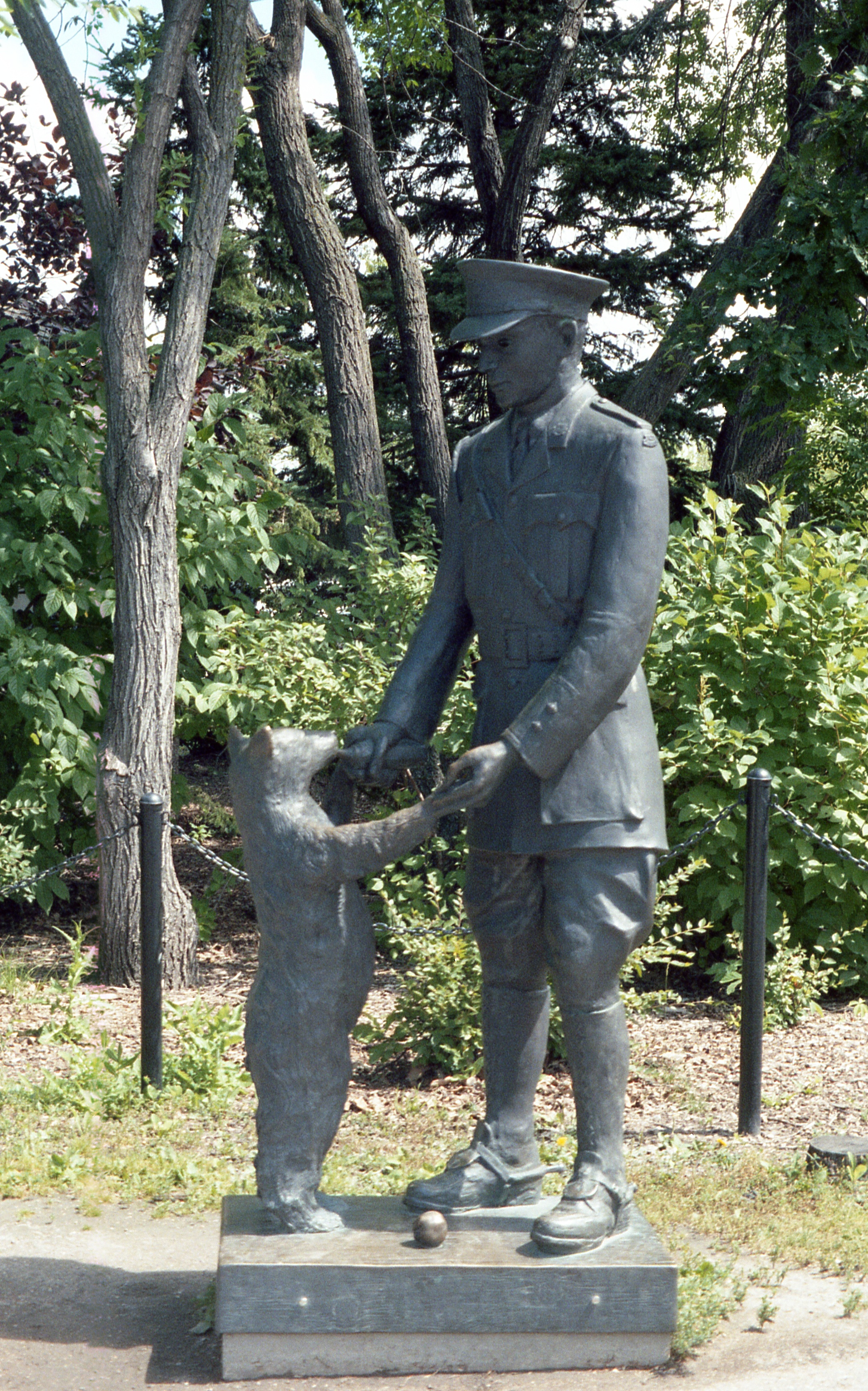
Statue in Winnipeg of Harry Colebourn and Winnie

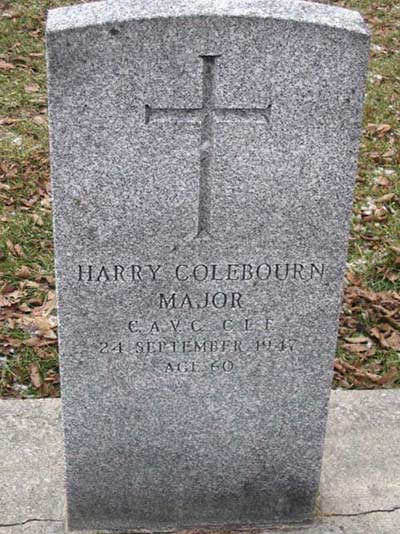
Colebourn is buried in a military cemetery in Canada underneath a regulation grave marker.

It was at the London Zoo that A. A. Milne and his son Christopher Robin Milne encountered Winnie. Christopher was so taken with her that he named his teddy bear after her, which became the inspiration for Milne's fictional character in the books Winnie-the-Pooh (1926) and The House at Pooh Corner (1928). Milne also included several poems about Winnie-the-Pooh in the children's poetry books When We Were Very Young and Now We Are Six. All four volumes were illustrated by E. H. Shepard. Winnie remained at the zoo until her death in 1934.

== After the war ==
After the war, Colebourn did post-graduate work at the Royal College of Veterinary Surgeons in London, England and then, in 1920, he returned to Canada and started a private practice in Winnipeg. He retired in 1945 and died in September 1947. He is buried in Brookside Cemetery in Winnipeg. There are statues of Colebourn and Winnie in Winnipeg's Assiniboine Park Zoo and at the London Zoo. Canada Post issued a postage stamp showing Colebourn with his bear in 1996.

== Books and movies ==
- Shushkewich, Val. The Real Winnie: A One-of-a-Kind Bear, Toronto, ON: Natural Heritage Books, 2003. ISBN 1-896219-89-6
- A Bear Named Winnie - a 2004 made-for-television drama film about Colebourn and Winnipeg.

The movie starred Michael Fassbender as Colebourn, alongside Gil Bellows, David Suchet and Stephen Fry.

- Lindsay Mattick: Finding Winnie: The True Story of the World’s Most Famous Bear, Little, Brown Books for Young Readers, 2015. ISBN 9780316324908
- M A Appleby: Winnie the Bear: The True Story Behind A. A. Milne's Famous Bear. Createspace Independent Publishing Platform, 2014
- Winnie's Great War. Silver Birch award nominee written by Lindsay Mattick

== See also ==
- Winnipeg the Bear
