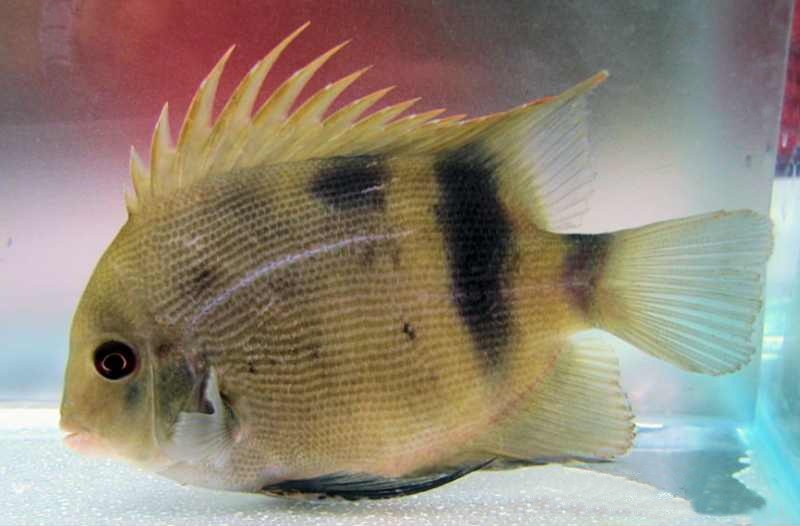
- Uaru fernandezyepezi
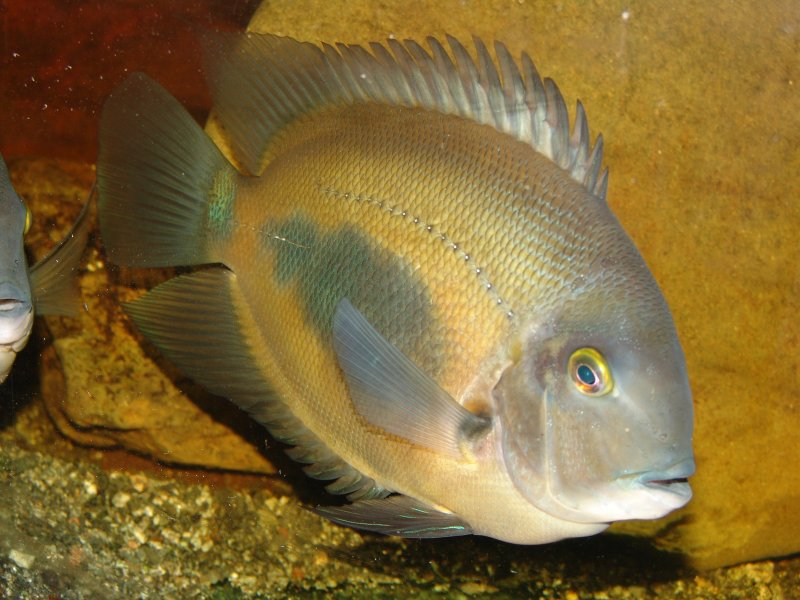
- Uaru amphiacanthoides

Scientific classification
- Kingdom: Animalia
- Phylum: Chordata
- Class: Actinopterygii
- Order: Cichliformes
- Family: Cichlidae
- Tribe: Heroini
- Genus: Uaru; Heckel, 1840

Type species
- Uaru amphiacanthoides Heckel, 1840

= Uaru =

Genus of fishes

Uaru is a small genus of cichlids found in blackwater and whitewater habitats in the upper Orinoco and the Amazon basin.

== Etymology ==
The name Uaru comes from the Amazon word for toad.

== Species ==
There are currently two recognized species in this genus:

- Uaru amphiacanthoides Heckel, 1840 (uaru)
- Uaru fernandezyepezi Stawikowski, 1989

== See also ==
- List of freshwater aquarium fish species
