= A Bear Named Winnie =

- Written by: John Kent Harrison; John Goldsmith
- Story by: Simon Vaughan
- Directed by: John Kent Harrison
- Starring: Michael Fassbender; David Suchet; Gil Bellows; Stephen Fry; Jonathon Young
- Music by: Charlie Mole
- Country of origin: Canada
- Original language: English

Production
- Producers: Simon Vaughan; Kim Todd
- Cinematography: Jean Lépine
- Editor: Ron Wisman
- Running time: 90 minutes
- Production companies: Original Pictures; PowerCorp

Original release
- Release: 12 December 2004

A Bear Named Winnie is a 2004 made-for-television drama film directed by John Kent Harrison. It stars Michael Fassbender and David Suchet. It concerns one of the real-life inspirations behind A. A. Milne's Winnie-the-Pooh.

== Plot ==
At the outbreak of World War I, troops march through the Manitoban city of Winnipeg. Among them is Lieutenant Harry Colebourn (Fassbender), a veteran with a gift for animals. He soon meets a bear, Winnie, who provides comfort for the soldiers and by order of General Hallholland (David Suchet), becomes the regimental mascot.

== Cast ==
- Michael Fassbender as Harry Colebourn
- David Suchet as General Hallholland
- Gil Bellows as Colonel Barret
- Stephen Fry as Protheroe
- Jonathon Young as Macray
- Aaron Ashmore as Corporal Randy Taylor
- Ted Atherton as Captain Elliot
- Robert Gauvin as Sgt. Major Picard

== Copyright ==
To avoid legal problems concerning the copyrights of both Disney and the Milne estate, Winnie the Pooh and anything related to the property is never referenced nor discussed throughout the film.

== Critical response ==
John Ferguson of The Radio Times awarded it two stars and said, "This touching fact-based drama almost manages to carry off its combination of First World War setting and sentimental tale, but is unsure of its target audience."

== See also ==
- Goodbye Christopher Robin - a 2017 biographical drama film about Milne and his son, with Vaughan also acting as a writer and producer.

== Bibliography ==
- Maloney, Jim (3 September 2012). Michael Fassbender – The Biography. John Blake Publishing. ISBN 978-1-78219-075-2.
