= White River, Ontario =

White River
- Township (single-tier)
- Township of White River
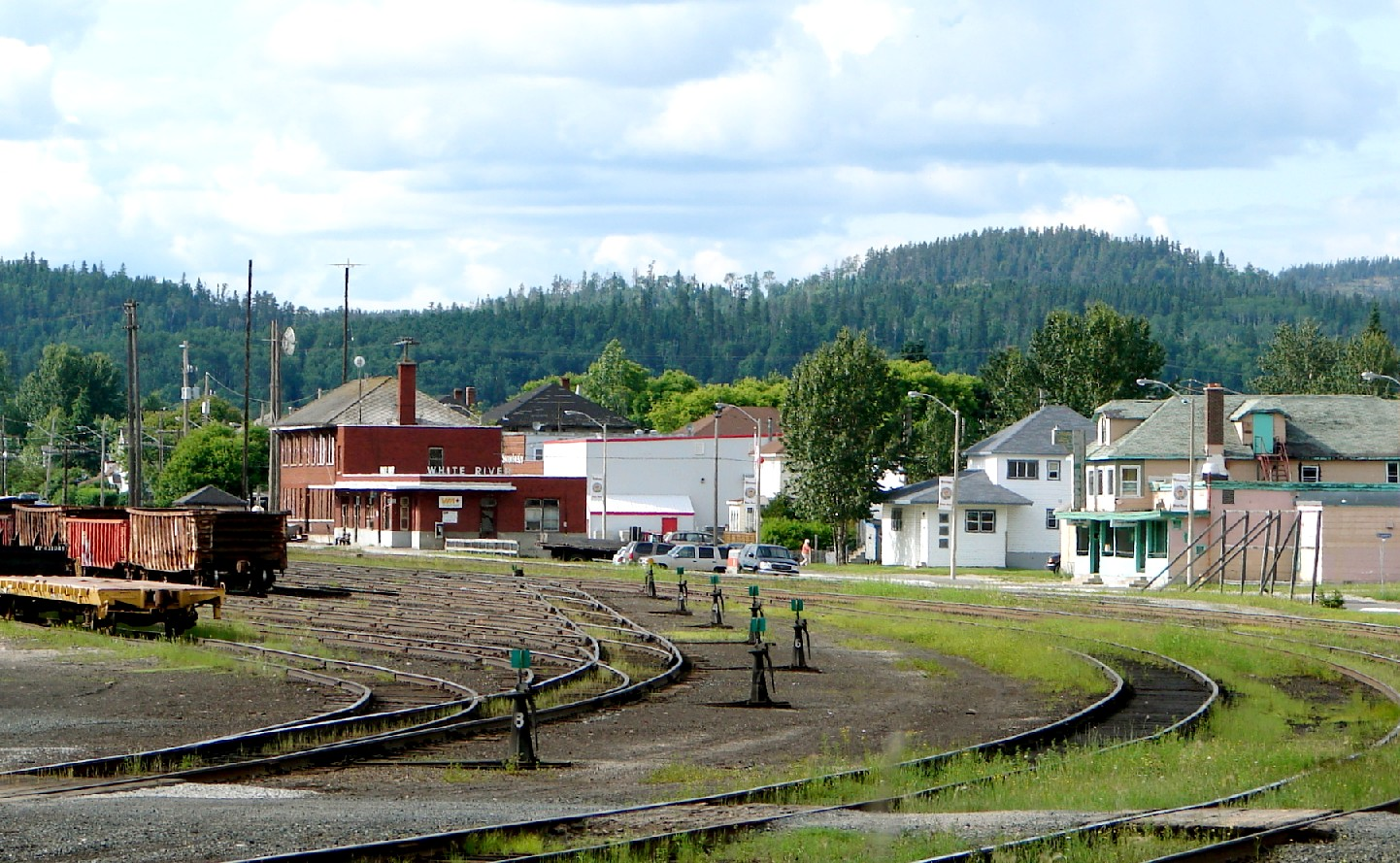

- Location within Ontario
- Coordinates: 48°35′N 85°17′W
- Country: Canada
- Province: Ontario
- District: Algoma
- Established: 1885

Government
  - Type: Township
  - Mayor: Tara Anderson Hart
  - Fed. riding: Sault Ste. Marie—Algoma
  - Prov. riding: Algoma—Manitoulin

Area
  - Land: 95.55 km^{2} (36.89 sq mi)

Population (2021)
  - Total: 557
  - Density: 5.8/km^{2} (15/sq mi)
- Time zone: UTC-5 (EST)
  - Summer (DST): UTC-4 (EDT)
- Postal Code: P0M
- Area code: 807
- Highways: Highway 17 Highway 631
- Website: www.whiteriver.ca

White River is a township located in Northeastern Ontario, Canada, at the western end of the District of Algoma. It sits along the namesake White River and the junction of Highway 17 of the Trans-Canada Highway, and Highway 631. It was originally a railway town on the Canadian Pacific Railway in 1885, and is still served by a passenger rail service to Sudbury, the Budd Car managed by Via Rail.

Its main employers include White River Forest Products (a softwood lumber mill), Albert Bazzoni Ltd., A&W Restaurant, Tri Timber, NCCP, CP Rail, Home Hardware, and Primary Power.

== History ==
In the early 1880s, White River started as a workcamp along the Canadian Pacific Railway, then under construction, but grew into a town when this site was selected by William Van Horne as the railway's divisional point. By 1886, it had a station house, fine hotels and an ice house. A stockyard to feed and water the livestock that regularly traveled through was also added. Its population grew from 10 families in 1886 to 42 families in 1906.

In 1961, Highway 17 reached White River, making it accessible by car. This brought new industries and businesses, particularly tourism-related, to the town, ending its existence as an exclusive railway town. In the 1970s, Abitibi-Price established a lumber mill, which was purchased by Domtar Forest Products in 1984 and closed in July 2007. In 2013, the Domtar assets were purchased by the Township of White River and the Netmizaaggamig Nishnaabeg (Pic Mobert First Nation) along with private partners. The mill was then reopened, with significant investment in new equipment, as White River Forest Products LP.

== Geography ==
White River is located north of Lake Superior, on White River and halfway along Highway 17 between Marathon and Wawa. This is also roughly halfway between Toronto and Winnipeg.

=== Climate ===
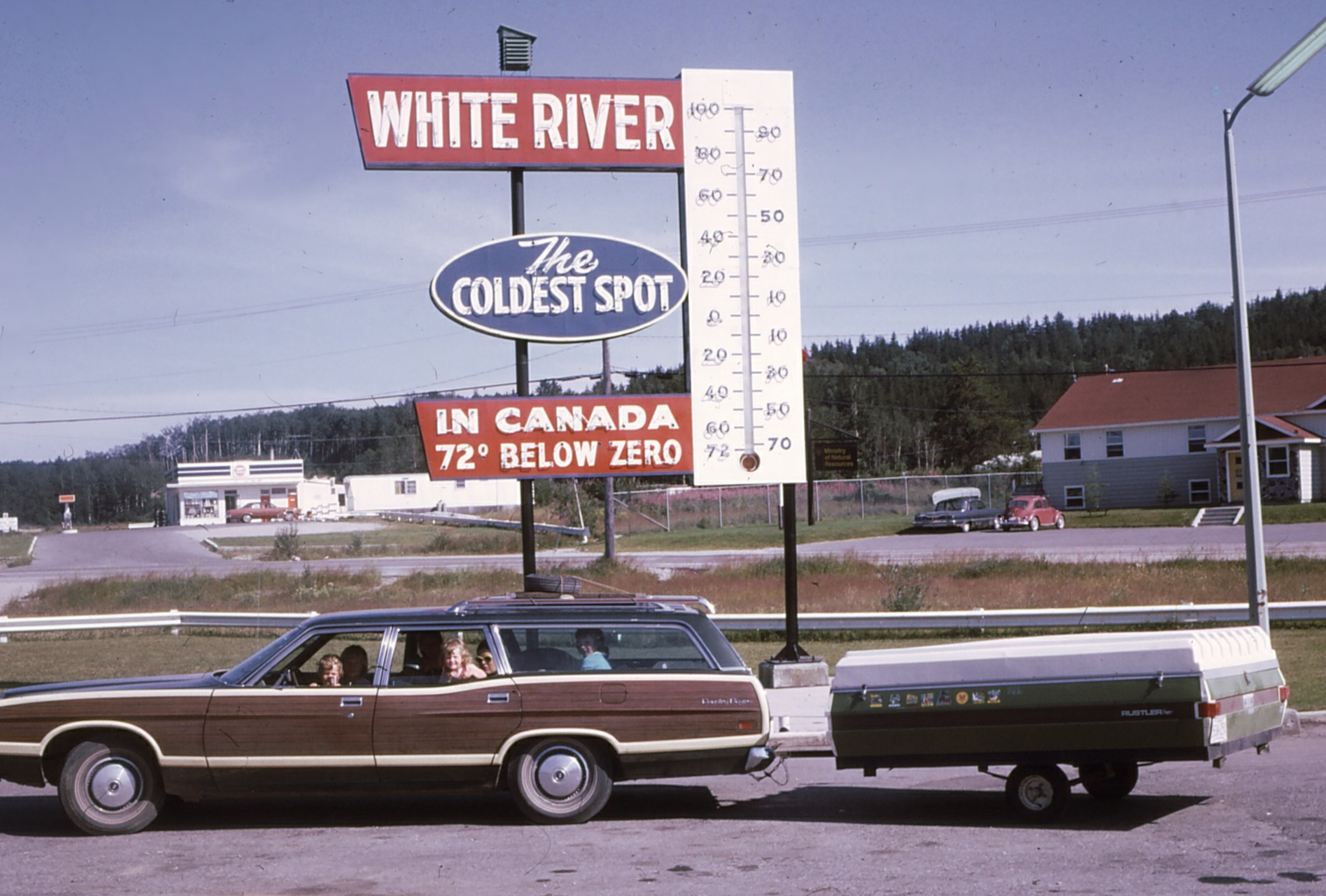
A highway sign in 1973 promoting White River as the "Coldest Spot in Canada".

White River advertises itself as "The Coldest Spot in Canada" with recorded temperatures as low as −58 °C (−72 °F). However, this is a myth, as the coldest temperature in Canada was recorded in Snag, Yukon, at −62.8 °C (−81.0 °F) on 3 February 1947. Even in Ontario, the coldest recorded temperature was in Iroquois Falls on 23 January 1935 [−58.3 °C (−72.9 °F)], which is also the lowest temperature ever recorded in Eastern Canada. White River's reputation for being the "coldest spot" is probably based on the fact that for many years, its reported temperature was deemed "the coldest in the nation today" from the handful of stations reporting daily temperature extremes in newspapers and on radio, with most stations' data being available only on a monthly basis to Environment Canada at the time.

Its official weather station (which closed in 1976) was located in a frost hollow, but most residential areas have good air drainage and do not see temperatures far below −40 °C (−40 °F). Gardeners can keep their flowers alive into October and grow non-boreal species such as silver maple.

== Demographics ==
In the 2021 Census of Population conducted by Statistics Canada, White River had a population of 557 living in 270 of its 333 total private dwellings, a change of −13.6% from its 2016 population of 645. With a land area of 95.55 km^{2} (36.89 sq mi), it had a population density of 5.8/km^{2} (15.1/sq mi) in 2021.

Canada census – White River, Ontario community profile

	2021	2016	2011
Population	557 (-13.6% from 2016)	645 (+6.3% from 2011)	607 (-27.8% from 2006)
Land area	95.55 km^{2} (36.89 sq mi)	96.78 km^{2} (37.37 sq mi)	96.94 km^{2} (37.43 sq mi)
Population density	5.8/km^{2} (15/sq mi)	6.3/km^{2} (16/sq mi)	6.3/km^{2} (16/sq mi)
Median age	50.0 (M: 52.8, F: 47.2)	48.0 (M: 48.8, F: 47.3)	46.9 (M: 46.8, F: 47.1)
Private dwellings	333 (total) 270 (occupied)	411 (total)	435 (total)
Median household income	$80,000	$74,752	$58,732

References: 2021 2016 2011

Historical census populations – White River, Ontario

Year	Pop.	±%
1961	836	—
1966	900	+7.7%
1971	953	+5.9%
1976	762	−20.0%
1981	1,006	+32.0%
1986	1,132	+12.5%
1991	948	−16.3%

Year	Pop.	±%
1996	1,022	+7.8%
2001	993	−2.8%
2006	841	−15.3%
2011	607	−27.8%
2016	645	+6.3%
2021	557	−13.6%

Source: Statistics Canada

Mother tongue (2021):

- English as first language: 82.0%
- French as first language: 12.6%
- English and French as first languages: 0.9%
- Other as first language: 2.7%

== Tourism ==
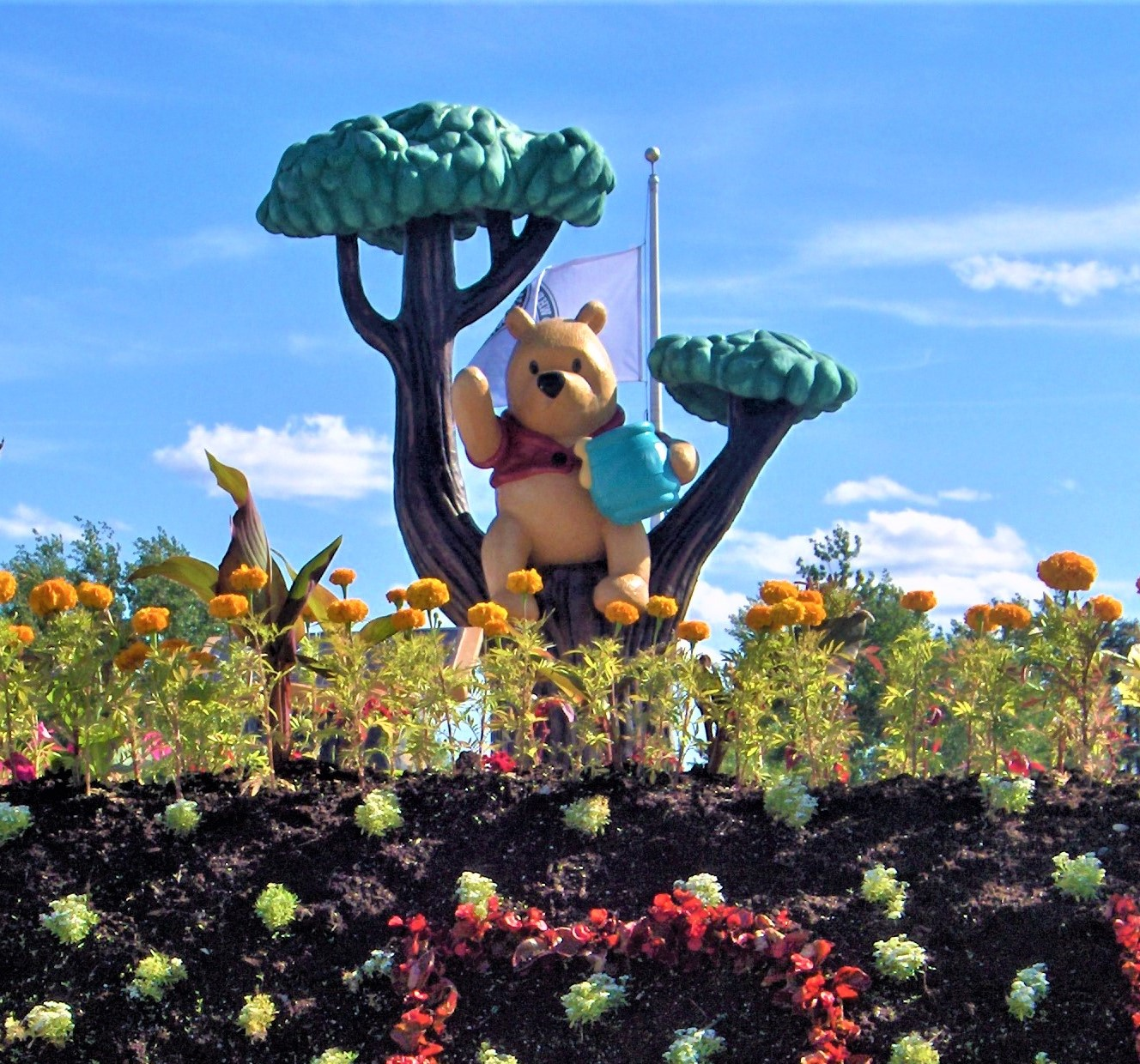
White River- the Hometown of Winnie the Pooh

The township is perhaps best known for being the home of Winnie the Pooh. In August 1914, a trapped black bear cub was sold to Captain Harry Colebourn in White River, and Colebourn named it Winnipeg, or Winnie, after his hometown of Winnipeg, Manitoba. Over the years, the animal became the basis for the popular literary character. The town celebrates "Winnie's Hometown Festival" every third week in August.

Being surrounded by wilderness, White River has a lot of outdoor recreation opportunities. Summer activities include hiking, biking, fishing, hunting, boating and canoeing. In the winter the town offers cross-country skiing and snowmobiling.

Other attractions include:

- Heritage Museum - documents the history of White River and includes Canadian Pacific Railway artifacts, rare Winnie the Pooh artifacts, displays White River in the early 1900s, as well as some artwork by the Group of Seven.
- Authentic Canadian Pacific Railway caboose
- Picnic Lake - with an unsupervised sandy beach, picnic tables, and boat launch.
- Tukanee Lake - nature area with rocks, water, and trails.

== Transportation ==
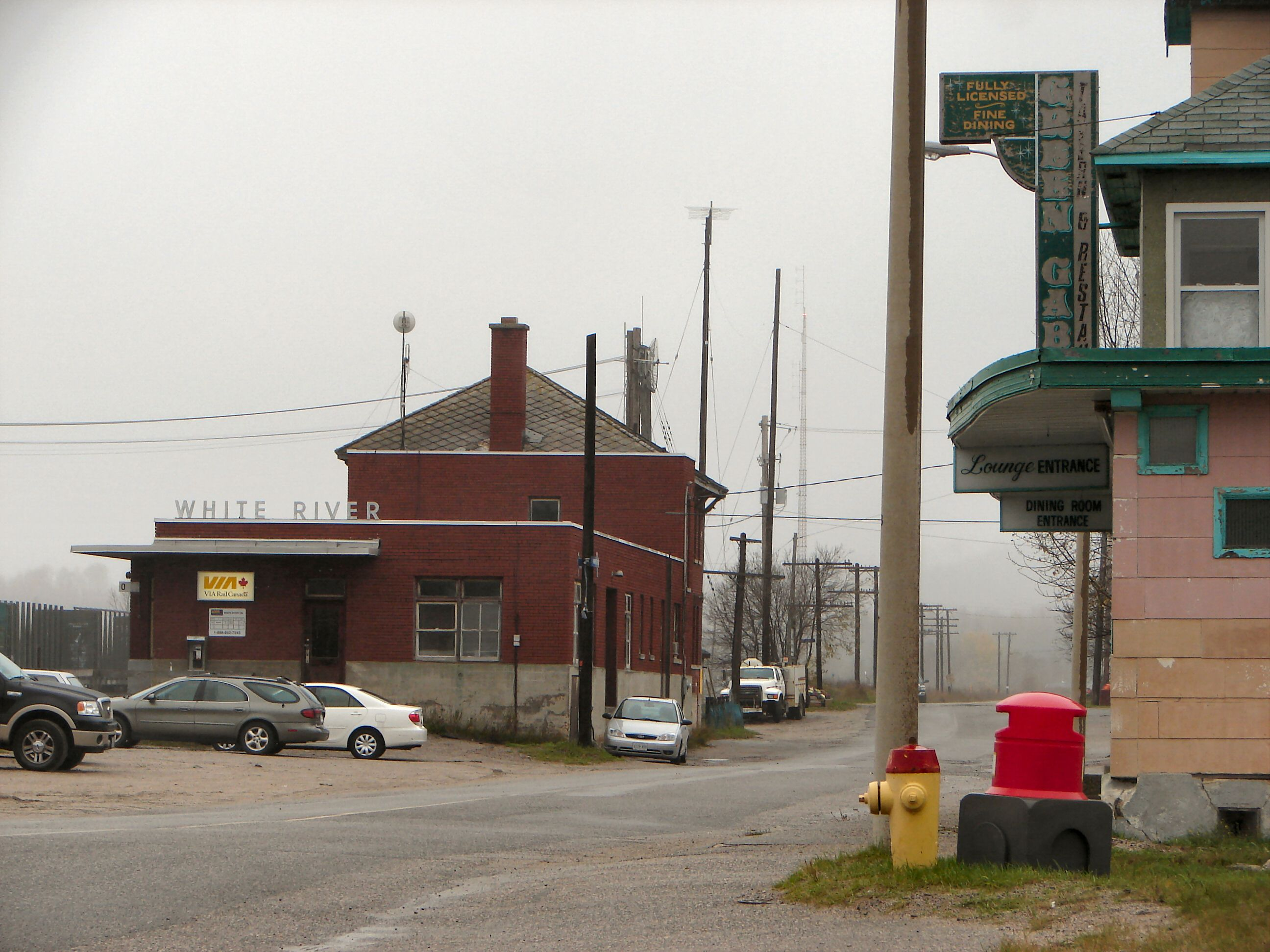
The train station in White River.

White River is located at the intersection of Highway 17 and Highway 631, which connects the town to Highway 11 to the north.

White River station is the western terminus of Via Rail's thrice-weekly Sudbury–White River train, which operates east to Greater Sudbury. Greyhound Canada stopped serving White River on 31 October 2018, when it ended all service west of Sudbury. Ontario Northland buses continue to serve White River.

== In popular culture ==
White River is referenced by the Canadian singer/songwriter Christine Fellows in her song "Migrations".

== See also ==
- List of townships in Ontario
- List of francophone communities in Ontario
