= Francis Skinner (architect) =

British architect

Russell Thomas Francis Skinner (13 October 1908 – 6 January 1998) was a British architect and the longest-serving member of Tecton, the architectural practice founded by Berthold Lubetkin in 1932 that pioneered the Modern Movement in Britain. As the historian John Allan recalls, ‘Skinner was Lubetkin's closest colleague, who shared and supported his charismatic partner's belief in modern architecture as an instrument of social progress’.

Politically and architecturally radical, Skinner trained at the Architectural Association from 1927 but reacted strongly against ‘traditionalist teaching’ in favour of the progressive European Modernism embodied by Lubetkin. ‘His first building, a prize-winning reinforced concrete house for the Modern Homes Exhibition at Gidea Park, was completed in 1934 when he was only 26’ (Allen). This house is still extant and in close to original condition. (64 Heath Drive Gidea Park) Restored extensively under the supervision of English Heritage, it is listed Grade 2. Skinner was active in the Communist Party, the Architects & Technicians Organisation, and other leftist groups that campaigned for better housing conditions and the unionisation of building workers. After first-hand observation of bomb damage in the Spanish Civil War he designed and promoted deep air-raid shelters.

Skinner took Lubetkin’s projects, for the progressive London Borough of Finsbury, starting with Finsbury Health Centre (1938), continuing after World War II, with the Spa Green Estate, Priory Green and Bevin Court (Holford Square), for which he designed the signage as well as supervising the project. John Allen records that Skinner ‘declined an invitation from Le Corbusier to join him at Chandigarh in 1950 but continued with major housing developments in Bethnal Green, Hackney and Southwark in the reformed firm of Skinner, Bailey & Lubetkin’. Many of his designs for London public housing are preserved in the British Architectural Library of the Royal Institute of British Architects.
