= Hallfield Estate =

Housing estate in Bayswater, London

Coordinates: 51°30′56.55″N 0°11′7.5″W

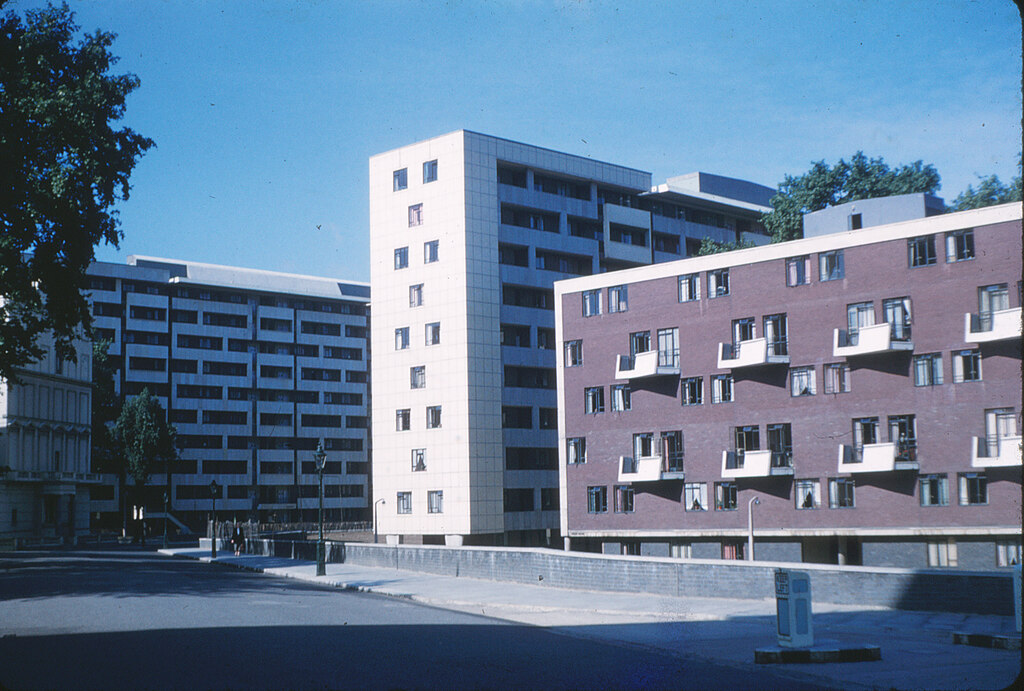
Hallfield Estate in 1956

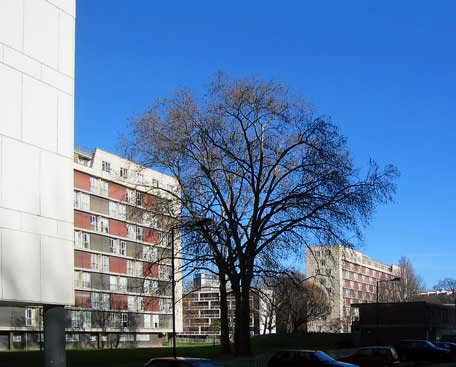
Hallfield in 2003

The Hallfield Estate is one of several modernist housing projects in Bayswater, City of Westminster, and was designed in the immediate postwar period by the Tecton architecture practice, led by Berthold Lubetkin. Following the dissolution of Tecton, the project was realised by Denys Lasdun and Lindsay Drake in the 1950s. Construction took place in two phases during 1951–55 and 1955–58.

The estate is at grid reference TQ260812, south of Bishops Bridge Road in Bayswater located in Westminster. It comprises 15 blocks spread over roughly 17 acres (69,000 m^{2}), a laundry (now used as the local Estate Office), and the Hallfield Primary School, also by Lasdun.

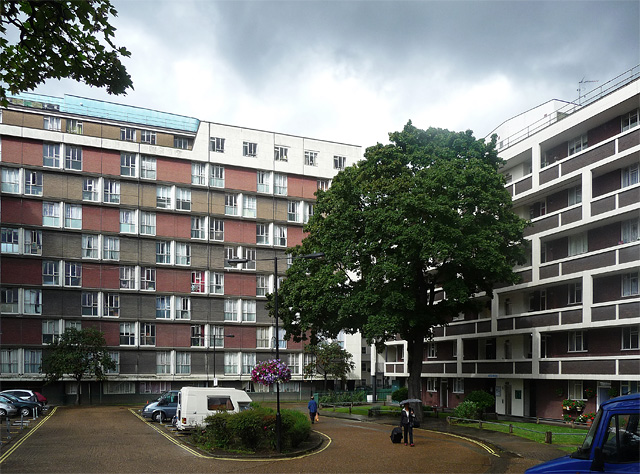
Hallfield Estate in 2011

== Architecture ==
Architecturally, the design shares much with similar Tecton projects of the period, including the Priory Green and Spa Green Estates, and the Finsbury Health Centre.

Hallfield was designated a conservation area by Westminster City Council in 1990, and the majority of Estate buildings were listed Grade II in June 2011.

John Penrose, the Minister responsible for the 2011 listing, commented: "These blocks show real flair and beauty, and all the more so considering the post-war era in which they were conceived. Sixty years on, they have become a distinctive part of the London landscape, still looking good and remaining popular with residents and visitors alike."

Hannah Parham, the English Heritage Designation Advisor, responded to the 2011 listing decision by adding: "The estate presents a convincing riposte to criticism that postwar council housing is grey, drab and utilitarian. At Hallfield, the exteriors of each block are treated like works of abstract art – some are patterned with a chequerboard of blue and red brickwork; others have a zigzagging screen of white concrete panels. The estate now exists amongst an elite group of 16 listed post-war housing estates in London – estates that are successful as places to live and are cared for by their residents."

== CityWest Homes controversy ==
In 2010, a £10 million pound project managed by CityWest Homes – Westminster Councils Arms-length management organisation – commenced to refurbish the estate.

The refurbishment included replacement of 50-year-old windows, as they did not meet the Government's Decent Homes Standard (requiring windows in blocks over six storeys to be replaced after 30 years). However, during 2012 and early in 2013 problems arose in the project.

On 30 December 2013, after reading a confidential report written by CityWest Homes chief executive officer Nick Barton, Westminster City Council and contractor Essex-based Mulalley reached a compromise agreement to end the contract. Following the controversy, Hallfield estate leaseholders considered taking legal action against CityWest Homes.
