= Chalk Hill =

Chalk Hill may refer to:

- Chalk hill, a hill made up of chalk
- Chalk Hill AVA, an American viticultural area in Sonoma County, California, US
- Chalk Hills, a mountain range in Los Angeles, California, US
- Chalk Hill Middle School, a middle school in Monroe, Connecticut, US
- The Chalk Hills Academy, a secondary school in Luton, Bedfordshire, England
- Chalkhill Estate in London, England

== See also ==
- Chalkhill (disambiguation)
