= Chalkhill =

Chalkhill may refer to:

- Chalkhill (estate), an estate in Brent, north-west London
- Chalkhill blue, a type of butterfly in the family Lycaenidae
- John Chalkhill, English poet
- Chalkhill, Pennsylvania, an unincorporated community in Wharton Township, Fayette County, Pennsylvania

== See also ==
- Chalk Hill (disambiguation)
