= Berthold Lubetkin =

Georgian-British architect (1901–1990)

- Born: Berthold Romanovich Lubetkin; 14 December 1901; Tbilisi, Georgia, Russian Empire
- Died: 23 October 1990 (aged 88); Bristol, United Kingdom
- Education: VKhUTEMAS; SVOMAS; Technische Hochschule Berlin; Berlin Textile Academy; Warsaw University of Technology; École Spéciale d'Architecture; École nationale supérieure des Beaux-Arts; École Supérieure de Béton Armé; Institut d'Urbanisme de Paris
- Occupation: Architect
- Awards: RIBA Royal Gold Medal (1982)
- Practice: Tecton

Berthold Romanovich Lubetkin (14 December 1901 – 23 October 1990) was a Russian-born British architect who pioneered modernist design in Britain in the 1930s. His work includes the Highpoint housing complex, the Penguin Pool at London Zoo, Finsbury Health Centre and Spa Green Estate.

== Early life and education ==
Berthold Lubetkin was born in 1901 in Tbilisi, then part of the Russian Empire (now the capital of Georgia), into a Jewish family. His father, Roman (Reuben) Aronovich Lubetkin (1885 – c.1940), was a Saint Petersburg-born civil engineer specialising in railway construction. His mother, Fenya Minin, may have met Roman while he was working on railway construction in the Caucasus region of the Russian Empire.

By 1916, the family had moved to Warsaw, where Roman ran a jewellery shop on Jerusalem Avenue. Meanwhile, Berthold had spent much of his youth in Saint Petersburg and Moscow, where he lived with relatives and attended various private schools. The family's financial stability, and extensive travel across Europe, exposed him to multiple cultures and languages, contributing to his fluency in German, French, and English.

In 1917, Lubetkin enrolled at the Vkhutemas in Moscow and the Svomas in Petrograd, studying under Constructivist figures such as Alexander Rodchenko and Vladimir Tatlin. He witnessed and participated in the Russian Revolution of 1917, and between 1919 and 1920 served as a reservist for the Red Army in Moscow.

In 1922, he moved to Berlin, studying at the Technische Hochschule and the Berlin Textile Academy. From 1923 to 1925, he studied architecture at the Warsaw Polytechnic. Encouraged by a professor, he continued his studies in Paris, enrolling at the École Spéciale d'Architecture in 1925. Over the following years, he trained at the Atelier Auguste Perret, the École des Beaux-Arts, the École Supérieure de Béton Armé, and the Institut d'Urbanisme at the Sorbonne, specialising in reinforced concrete and urban planning.

Although he possessed a birth certificate stating that he was born in Warsaw in 1903, Lubetkin later admitted that this was a false document, created to obscure time spent in the Red Army. His parents remained in Warsaw until 1939, but are presumed to have been murdered in Auschwitz in 1940 during the Holocaust. Later in life Lubetkin rarely spoke about his time in Warsaw, possibly due to personal and political reasons.

== Career ==
=== In Germany and France ===
Lubetkin practised in Paris in the 1920s in partnership with Jean Ginsburg, with whom he designed an apartment building on #25 Avenue de Versailles. In Paris, he associated with the leading figures of the European Avant Garde including Le Corbusier. He continued to participate in the debates of Constructivism, designing a trade pavilion for the USSR in Bordeaux and participating in the Palace of the Soviets competition, for which his entry was shortlisted.

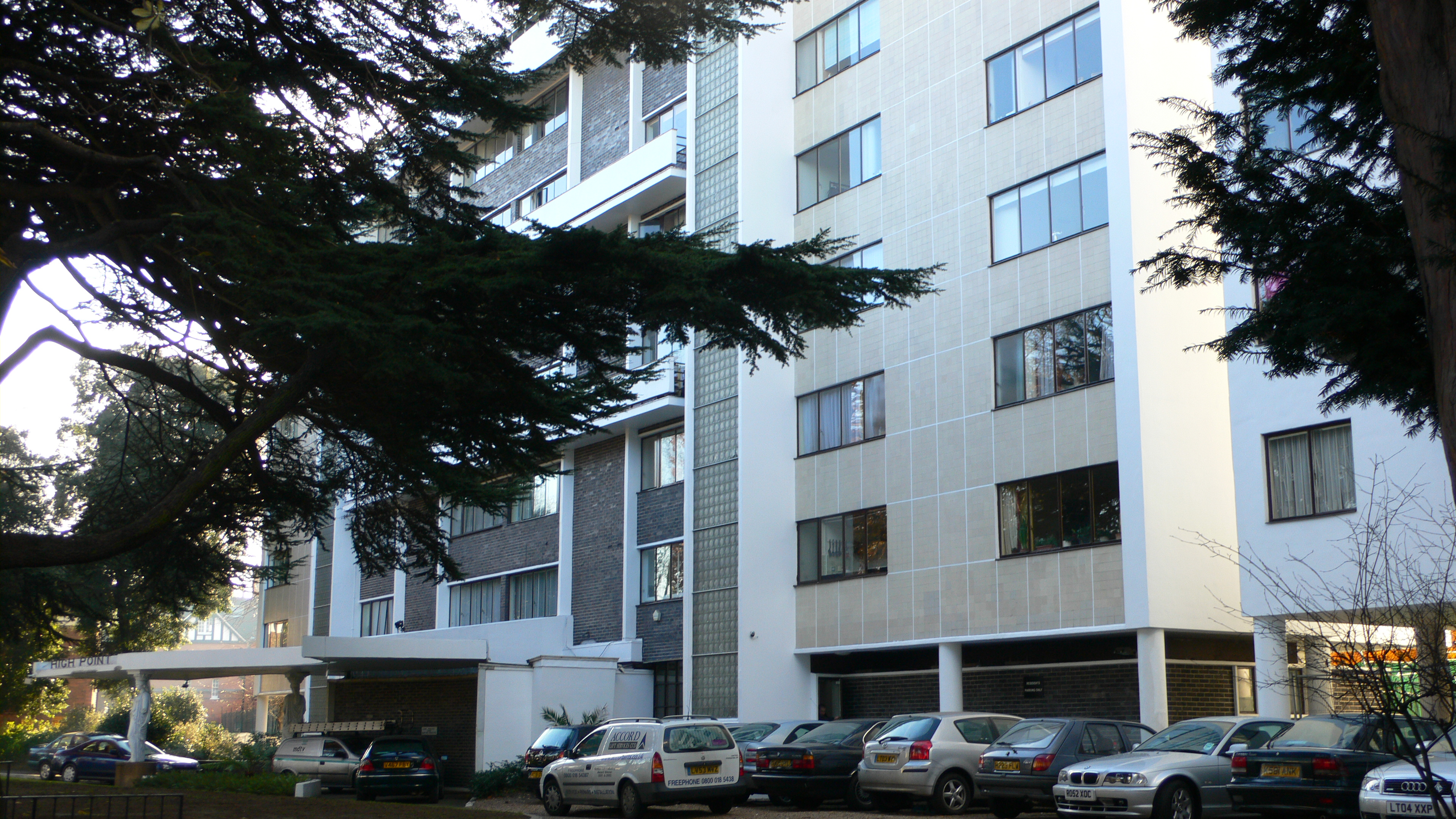
Highpoint Two

=== Emigration to the United Kingdom ===
Emigrating to London in 1931 from the Soviet Union, Lubetkin settled in the artists' community associated with the British art critic Herbert Read, located in Hampstead. In London he set up the architectural practice Tecton. The first projects of Tecton included landmark buildings for London Zoo, the Gorilla House and a penguin pool (clearly showing the influence of Naum Gabo). In 1934 Lubetkin designs and builds the first and only modernist terrace houses in England, in the highly dense Victorian suburban area of Plumstead, at 85–91 Genesta Road, SE18. These houses still represent a surprising sight, surrounded by Victorian terraces, and are Grade II listed. Lubetkin and Tecton set up the Architects and Technicians Organisation in 1936.

Tecton were also commissioned by London Zoo to design buildings for their reserve park at Whipsnade and to design a completely new zoo in Dudley. Dudley Zoo consisted of twelve animal enclosures and was a unique example of early Modernism in the UK. All of the original enclosures survive, apart from the penguin pool, which was demolished in 1979. According to the 20th Century Society: 'Encapsulated in the playful pavilions at Dudley is a call to remember the higher calling of all architecture, embracing not just material needs but also the desire to inspire and delight.'

Tecton's housing projects included private houses in Sydenham, the already mentioned modernist terraces at 85-91 Genesta Road in Plumstead, south London, and seven houses at Sunnywood Drive, Haywards Heath and most famously the Highpoint apartments in Highgate. Highpoint One was singled out for particular praise by Le Corbusier, while Highpoint Two exhibited a more surreal style, with its patterned facade and caryatids at the entrance.

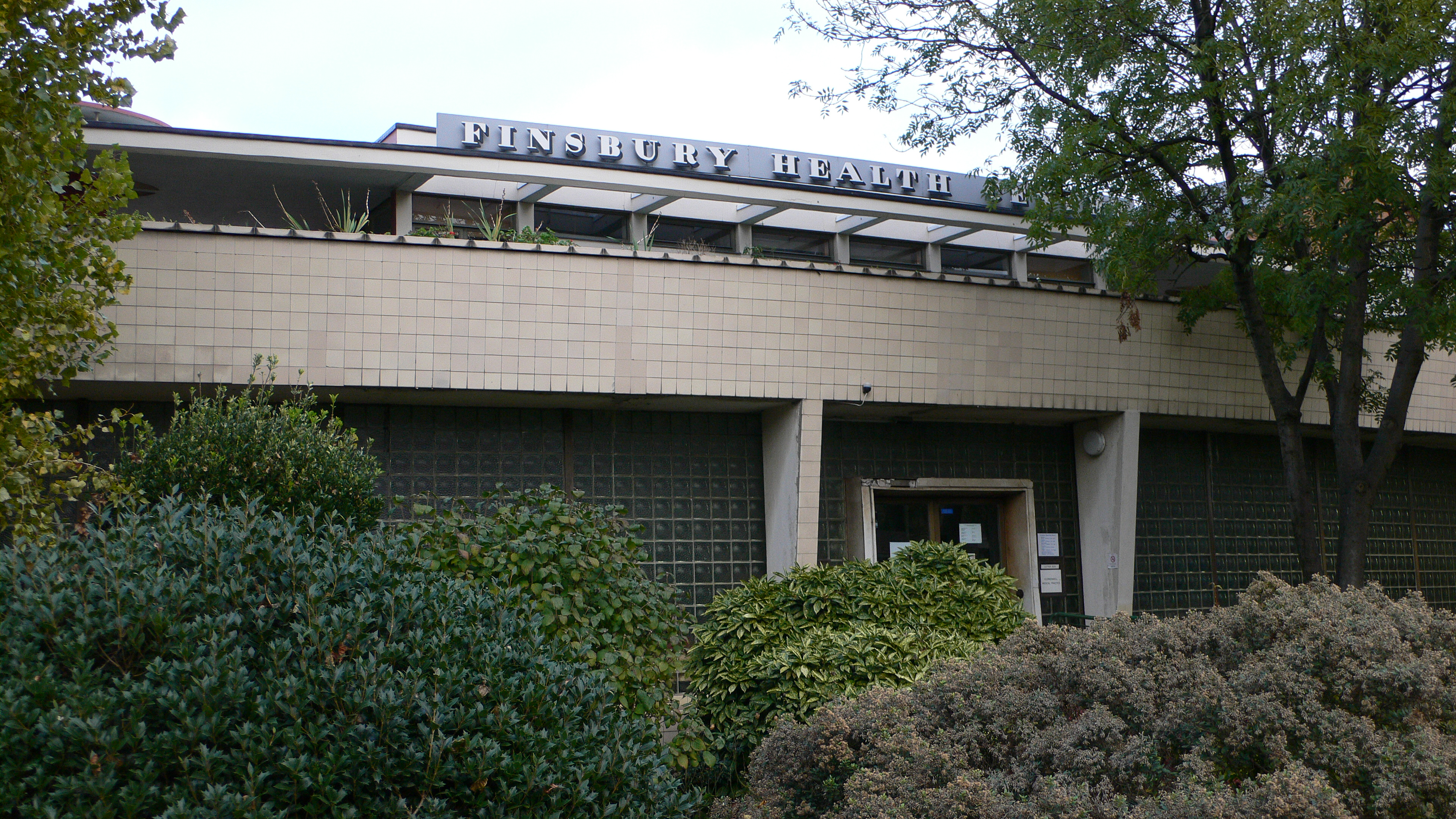
Finsbury Health Centre

The Labour Party council in the Metropolitan Borough of Finsbury were major patrons of Tecton, commissioning the Finsbury Health Centre, which was completed in 1938. Lubetkin and Tecton's achievement in Finsbury was to unite the aesthetic and political ambitions of Modernism with the radical municipal socialism of the Borough. The health centre resolved the tension between three key modernist ideals.

First: a social function; universal access to healthcare free at the point of use for the borough's residents (a decade before the NHS).

Second, the political; no longer was social good to be achieved through charity or hope, instead it was provided by a democratically elected and accountable municipal authority, funded through local taxation.

And third, the element which made Tecton's work unique, the aesthetic. The building's tiled facade shone above the surrounding slums, its rational conception asserted the ideal of a socialist future as the rational endgame to progress; in Lubetkin's words the architecture "cried out for a new world". Lubetkin's modernism – 'nothing is too good for ordinary people' – laid down a challenge to the class bound complacency of thirties Britain. But Tecton's plans to replace Finsbury's slums with modern flatted housing were stopped by the onset of war in 1939.

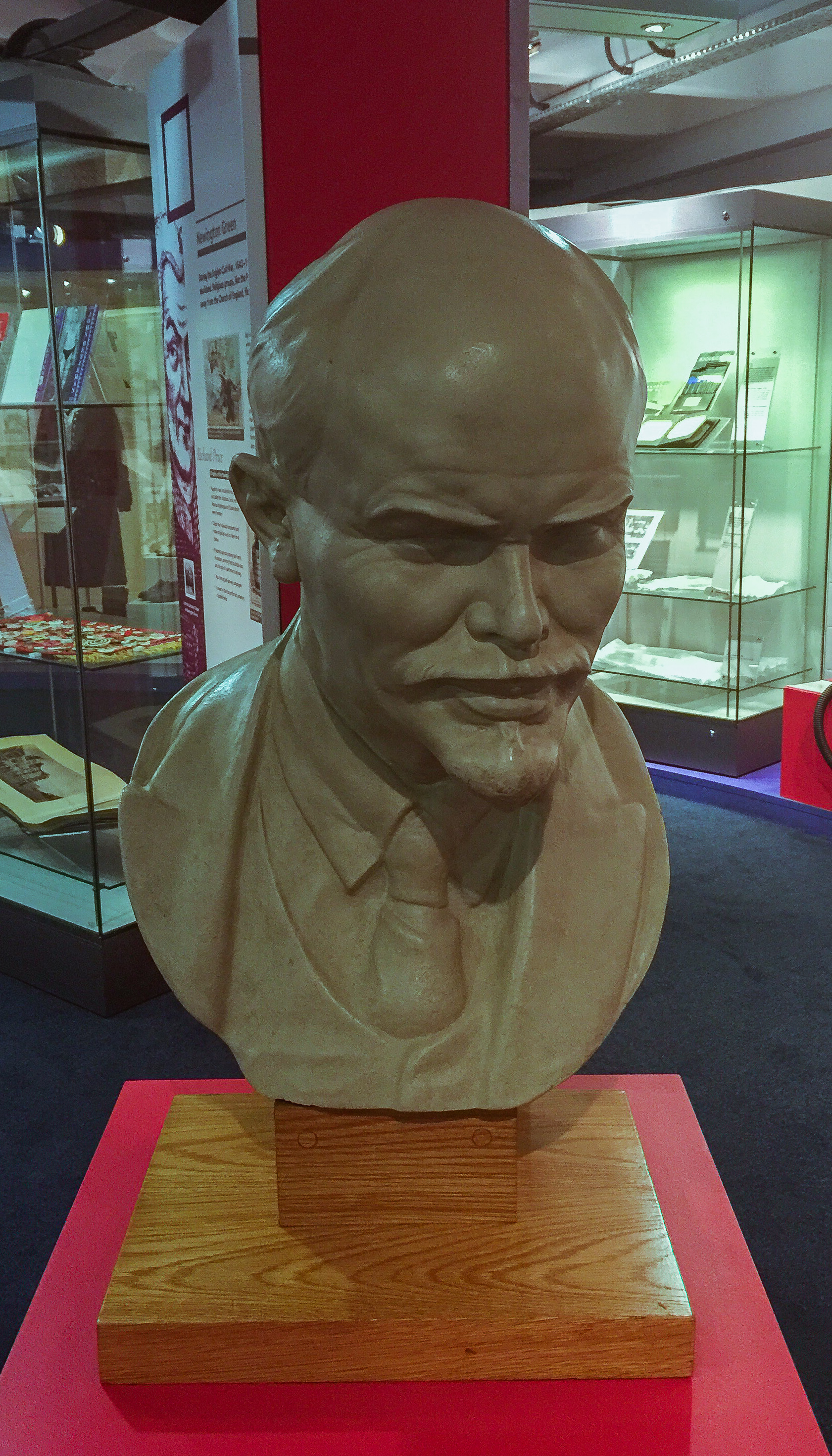
The bust of Lenin, displayed in Islington Museum

Paradoxically the war would move Lubetkin's work from the radical fringe to the mainstream. As the fighting progressed, the British government became increasingly committed to the idea of building a fairer society when peacetime came. As this was articulated through propaganda, Modernist architecture became the visual expression for this radiant future. Abram Games designed a series of posters comparing the promise of modernism, one featuring the Finsbury Health Centre, with the appalling realities of pre war Britain. The uncompromising title to each poster was: 'Your Britain- Fight for it Now'. A further sign of this political shift was the erection in 1941 of a statue in memorial to Lenin. Designed by Lubetkin, the memorial marked the site of Lenin's lodgings at Holford Square, London in 1902/3. The Monument had been defaced many times by those opposed to Communist Russia and its ideals at the time. This resulted in the monument being placed under 24-hour police guard.

=== Post-war ===
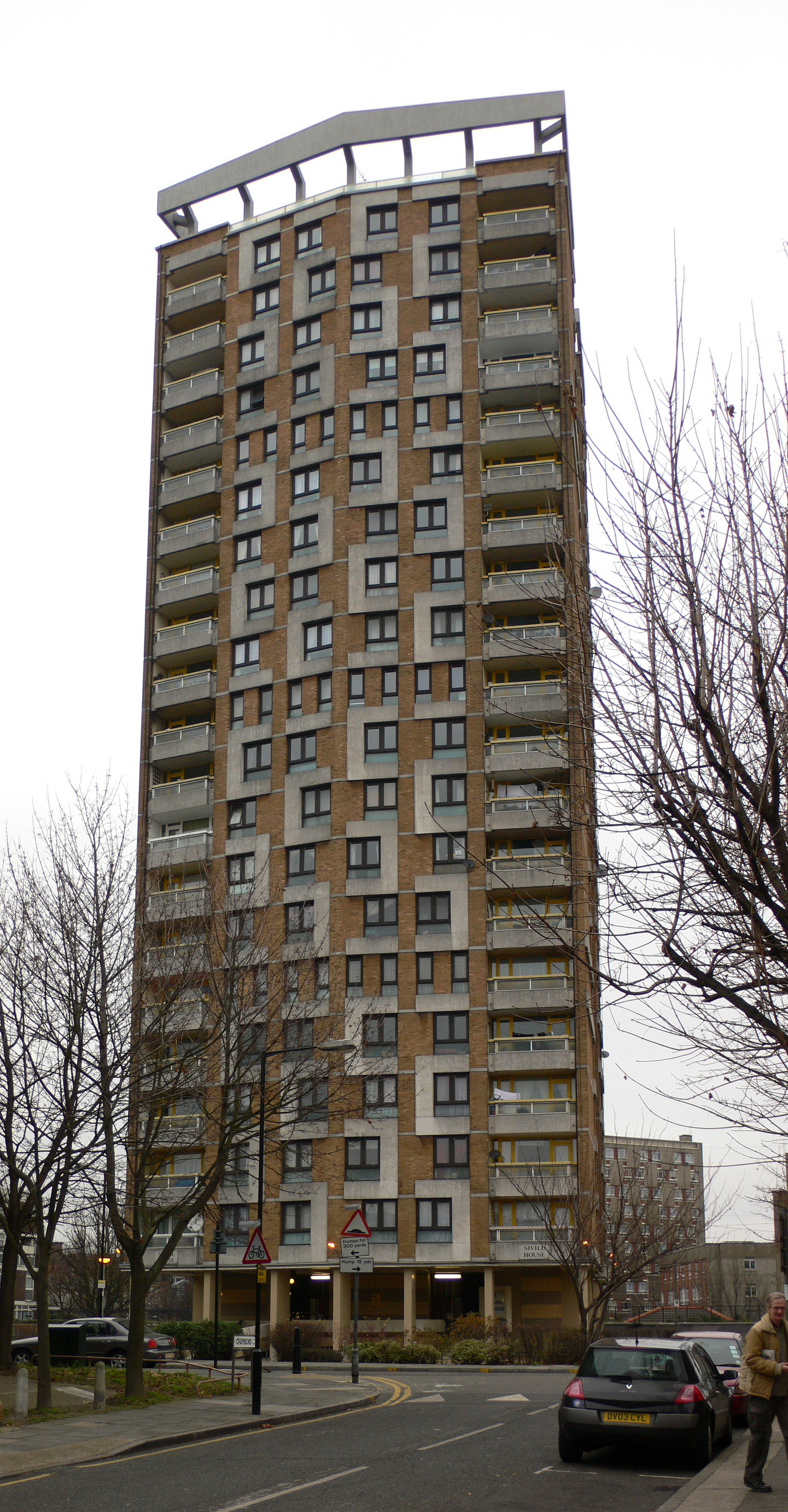
Sivill House

The post-war Labour victory was built on the promise of modernism as pioneered by Tecton. The Finsbury Health Centre became a model for the new National Health Service. To confirm the significance of Lubetkin's vision, the Minister of Health Aneurin Bevan laid the foundation stone to Tecton/Finsbury's Spa Green Estate in winter 1946. Spa Green remained the flagship estate, adapting many features from the luxury Highpoint flats for working families (including lifts, central heating, balconies, daylight from multiple directions, and a spectacular roof terrace); in 1998 it received a high Grade II* listing for its architectural significance and the 2008 restoration brought back the original colour scheme.

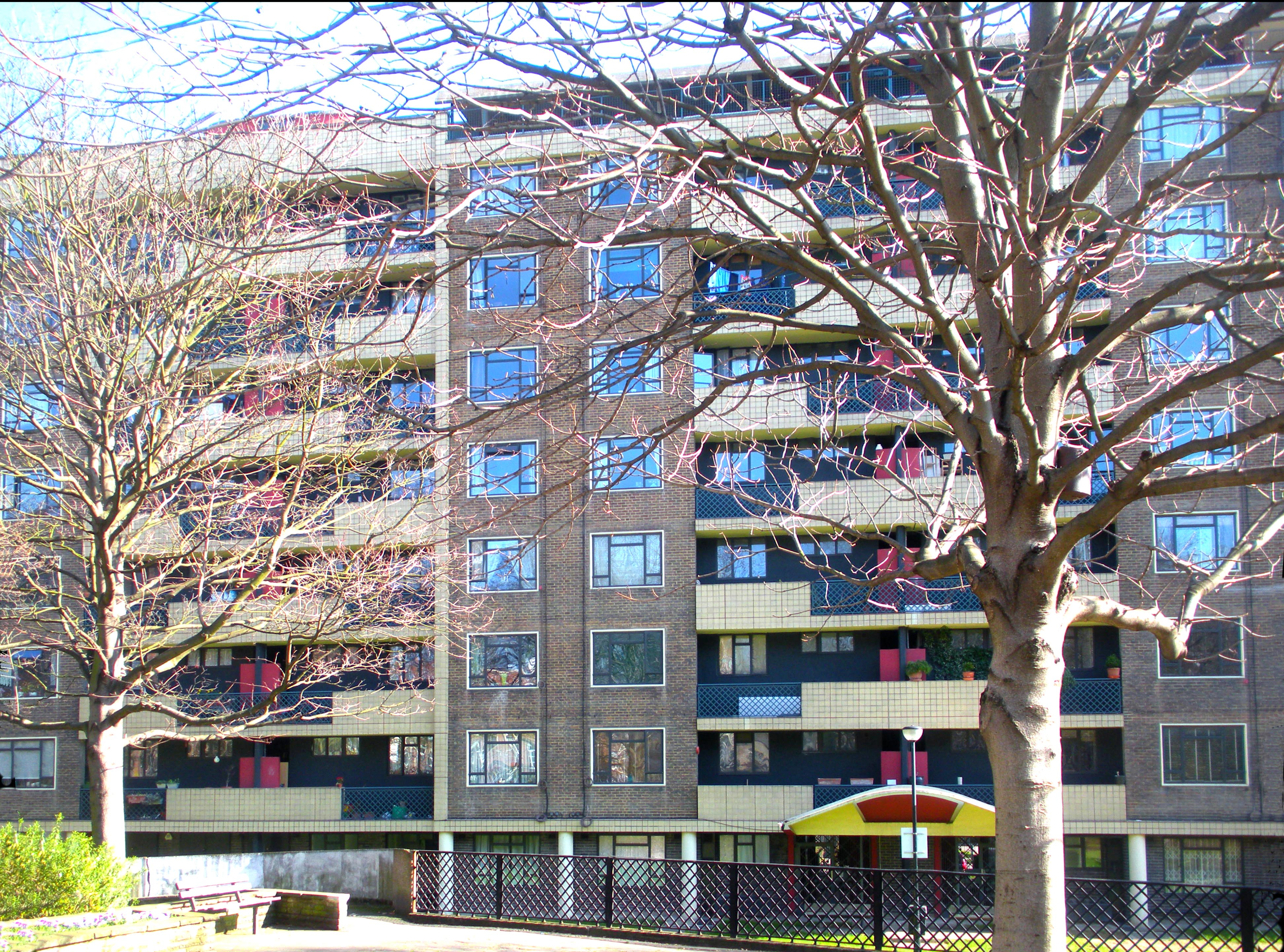
Spa Green

Spa Green was the first of a series of housing projects for the practice including Finsbury's Priory Green Estate and Tecton's work in Paddington (led by Denys Lasdun) at the Hallfield Estate. These all showed a more decorative, patterned style which contrasted greatly with the Brutalist style that was soon to emerge as the dominant form of welfare state architecture. Ironically, however, several features of Lubetkin's 1940s neo-Constructivist modernism have become staples of postmodern architecture, for example at Spa Green the floating roof canopy, the stairwells marked by repeated clusters of square 'windows', and the acute-angled canted meeting lodge.

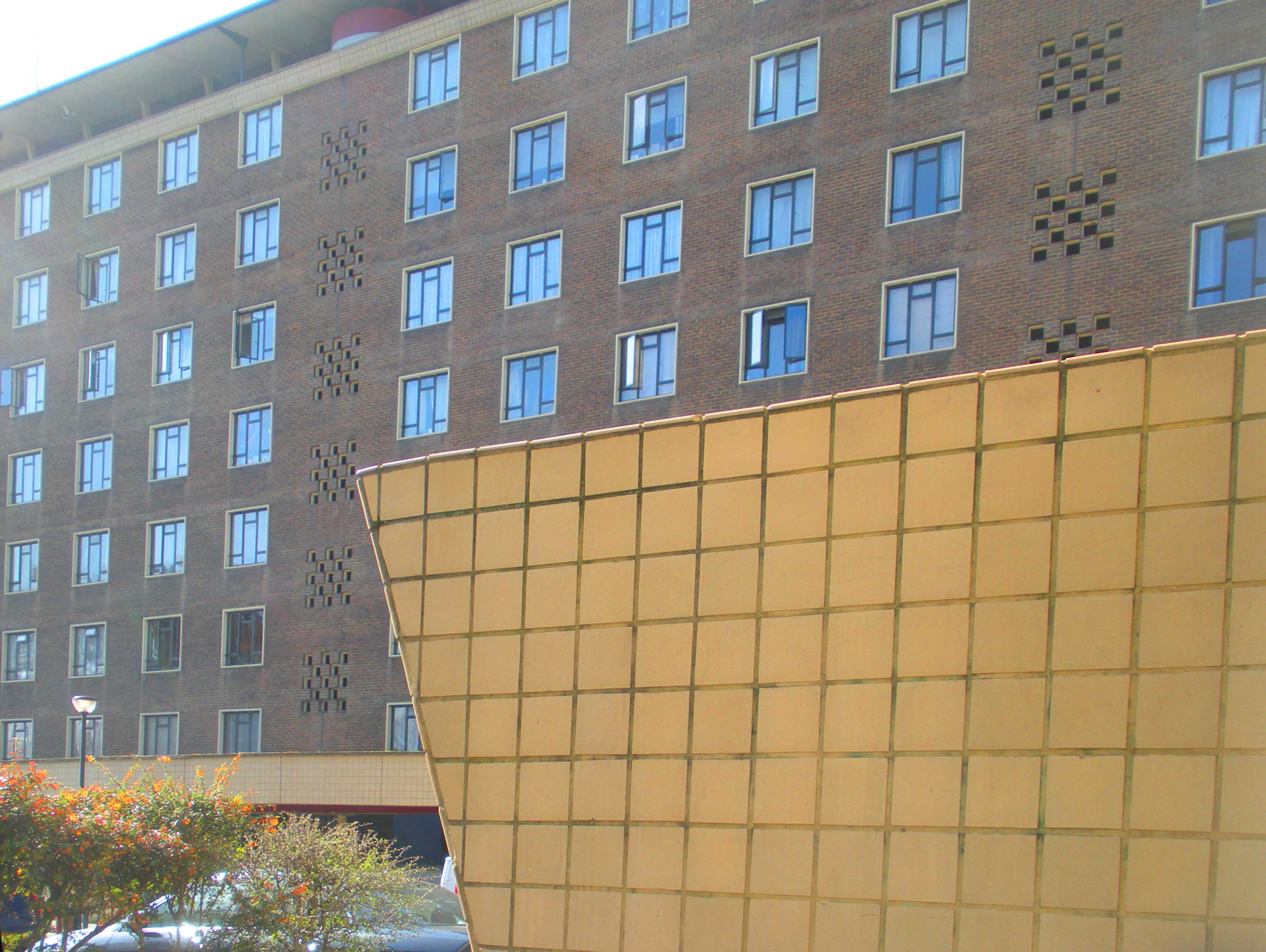
Spa Green Lodge and bedroom façade

For most of these projects Lubetkin and Tecton worked closely with Ove Arup as structural engineer. Arup's innovative concrete 'egg-crate' construction at Spa Green gave each flat clear views unobstructed by internal pillars, and his aerodynamic 'wind roof' provided a communal area for drying clothes and social gathering.

In 1947, Lubetkin was commissioned to be master planner and chief architect for the Peterlee new town, where he worked closely with Monica Felton. The following year Tecton was dissolved. Commenting on this, Lubetkin wrote to fellow Tecton member Carl Ludwig Franck "that after the war Tecton was at best a ghost of its former self".

Lubetkin's masterplan for Peterlee included a new civic centre for which he proposed a number of high rise towers. However the extraction of coal was to continue under the town for several years which posed a risk of subsidence. As a result, the National Coal Board (NCB), itself an agency of the Ministry of Fuel and Power would only consider a dispersed low density development. Despite investigating a number of options that would have allowed coal extraction to continue without preventing the proposed development, the NCB would not alter their policy. As Lubetkin was the employee of the Ministry of Town and Country Planning this developed into an inter-ministerial battle, and despite attempts at dispute resolution at cabinet level the difference in approach between the ministries remained. Frustrated at the unresolved bureaucratic battles, Lubetkin resigned from the Peterlee project in spring 1950. The only physical sign of his involvement in the scheme exists in the adjoining opposed parabola forms of the road layout at Thorntree Gill.

Lubetkin returned to Finsbury to complete (in collaboration with Francis Skinner and Douglas Bailey) his final project for the Borough, Bevin Court. Initially named Lenin Court the housing scheme was to incorporate Lubetkin's Lenin Memorial. Post-war austerity had imposed far greater budgetary constraints than in the showpiece Spa Green Estate, forcing Lubetkin to strip the project of the basic amenities he had planned; there were to be no balconies, community centre or nursery school. To save costs, Lubetkin made significant use of prefabricated floor and wall components. Instead he focused his energies on the social space. Fusing his aesthetic and political concerns he created a stunning constructivist staircase – a social condenser that forms the heart of the building. Before the building was completed the Cold war had intensified and as a result the scheme was renamed Bevin Court (honouring Britain's firmly anti-communist foreign secretary Ernest Bevin). In defiance, Lubetkin buried his memorial to Lenin under the central core to his staircase. The staircase was painted red as part of a restoration in 2014–2016.

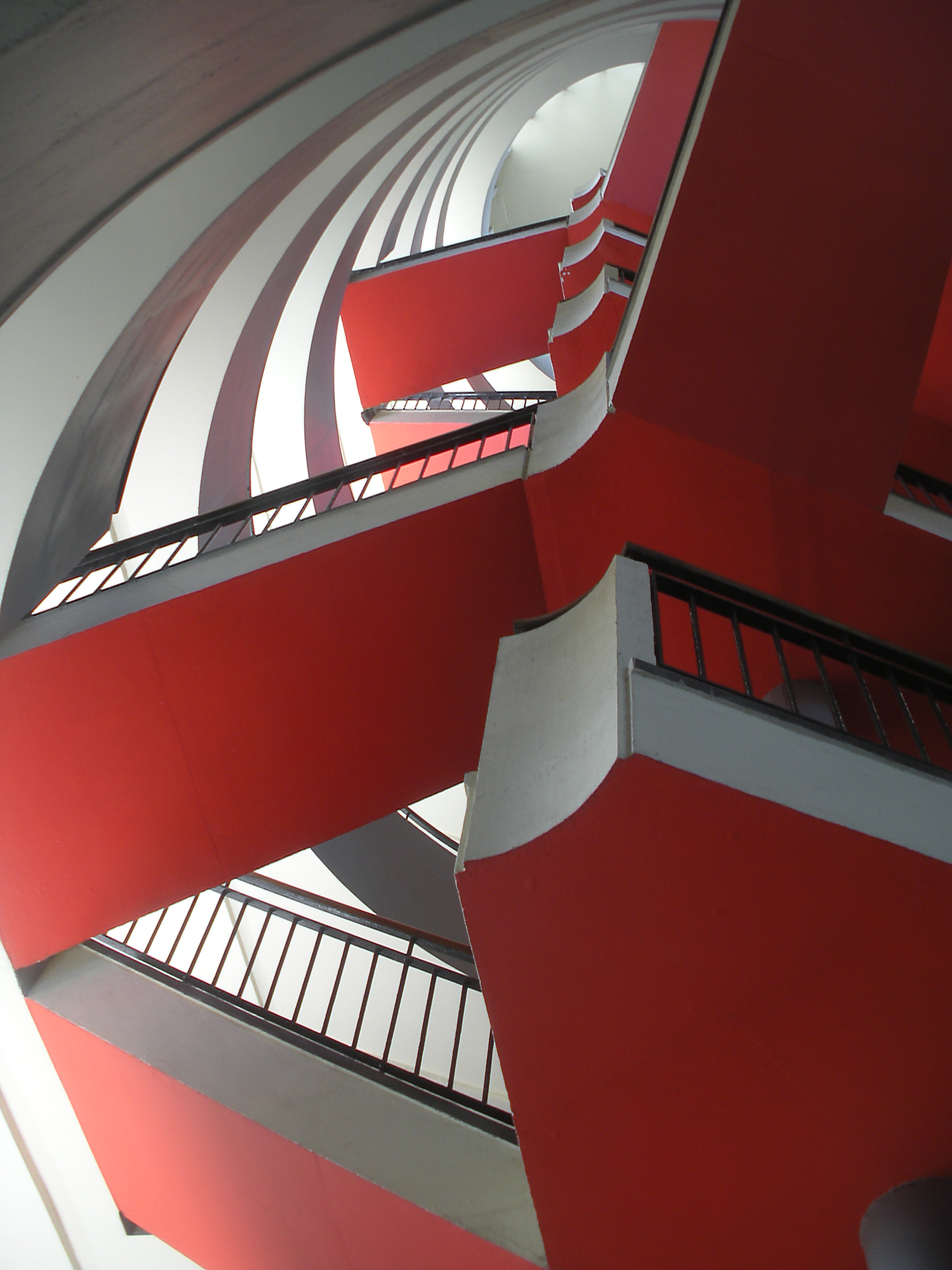
Berthold Lubetkin's staircase in Bevin Court, London, after repainting circa 2014

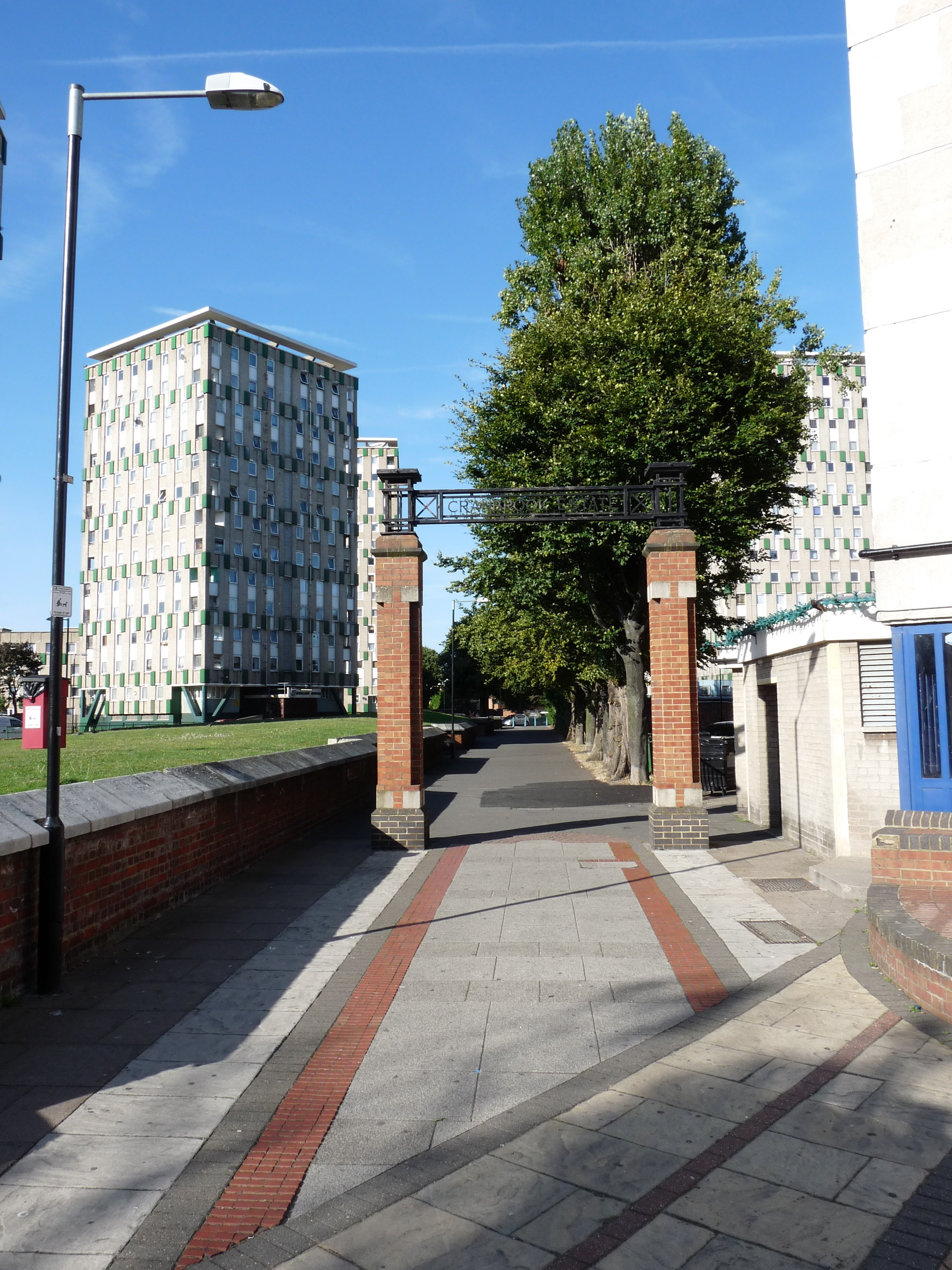
The Cranbrook Estate in Bethnal Green.

Tecton's work would also be a major influence on the Festival of Britain. However Lubetkin's efforts to gain employment with the London County Council (the authority with responsibility for building the Festival) were rebuffed.

Frustrated, Lubetkin spent increasing time at the Gloucestershire farm he had managed for the Beamish family since the start of World War II, before purchasing it for himself. Though he failed to win several design competitions during the 1950s, he (again with Bailey and Skinner) designed three large council estates in London's Bethnal Green (now a part of Tower Hamlets). These schemes, the Cranbrook Estate, Dorset Estate (which featured the tower Sivill House) and the Lakeview Estate all made increased use of precast concrete façade panels while developing the idiom of complicated abstract facades and Constructivist staircases established in the 1940s.

Lubetkin retired from architecture in 1952 and spent the following years, until 1959, managing a farm in Upper Kilcott, Gloucestershire. He ceased farming in 1969 and relocated to Bristol.

== Personal life ==
Lubetkin married architect Margaret Church in 1936, and they had four children: Alexandra (born 1942), Andrew (1945–1947), Steven (born 1946), and Louise (born 1949). In 1939, he became a naturalised British citizen and bought a farm in Upper Kilcott, Hillesly, Gloucestershire, where he spent much of his time raising cattle and cultivating pasture. Following his disillusionment with postwar government policies, he withdrew from public life in 1950, focusing on the farm.

Lubetkin's personal life was marked by strict discipline and ideological convictions, as his daughter Louise later described in a memoir. According to his daughter, Lubetkin had claimed that his father was a Russian Admiral, and that he had taken the name Lubetkin from a deceased Polish individual to obtain Polish citizenship. However, after Lubetkin's death, Louise found that he was born with the name, and was the son of a Jewish businessman. When questioned about his past, Lubetkin reportedly responded, “We all have secrets.”

Lubetkin and his wife eventually moved to Clifton, Bristol, where they campaigned to protect the views of Brunel's Clifton Suspension Bridge. He continued to live in Clifton after Margaret's death in 1978. In the 1970s, Lubetkin gradually re-emerged to public life, participating in interviews, exhibitions, and architectural discussions. Lubetkin died in Bristol on 23 October 1990 at the age of 88.

== Recognition and legacy ==
In 1982, Lubetkin was awarded the RIBA Royal Gold Medal. He died in Bristol in 1990. Lubetkin (with Tecton) was the subject of a travelling exhibition sponsored by the Arts Council of Great Britain which opened at the Arnolfini Gallery in Bristol and toured the UK and Europe 1980 – 1983, under the title "Lubetkin and Tecton: architecture and social commitment". This featured specially commissioned models and illustrative material from his archive and was designed by David King. He was also the subject of a Design Museum exhibition in 2005. His daughter, Louise Kehoe, published an award-winning memoir in 1995, 'In This Dark House', which included previously unknown details of Lubetkin's early years.

In 2009, East Durham & Houghall Community College, based in Peterlee, named its theatre after Lubetkin in honour of the vision he had for the town. The Lubetkin Theatre was officially opened by his daughter Sasha Lubetkin on 5 October 2009. At the opening Sasha Lubetkin said: "I’m immensely proud that this beautiful theatre has been named after my father and that his work is remembered in spite of the brutal way it ended. He had such dreams for Peterlee, he wanted to turn it into the miners capital of the world. His respect and admiration of the miners made him want to create something really special that didn’t exist anywhere else but unfortunately that wasn’t possible."

The British Cement Association established the Berthold Lubetkin Memorial Lecture, the first given by the Japanese architect Tadao Ando in 1992, and RIBA the annual Lubetkin Prize for International Architecture.

== Associated with Lubetkin ==
- Ove Arup
- Marcel Breuer
- Wells Coates
- Carl Ludwig Franck
- Arthur Korn
- Denys Lasdun
- Francis Skinner

== See also ==
- Ernő Goldfinger
- Isokon
- MARS Group
- Constructivist architecture
