= Garchey =

20th-century refuse disposal system

The Garchey System was an early refuse disposal system in the United Kingdom. Devised by Louis Garchey, a Frenchman, it was first installed in blocks of flats in France during the 1930s. It was first used in the UK in 1935 after the City of Leeds installed it in one of its housing blocks. A British firm holds the UK rights.

Similar systems were installed in various buildings during the 1950s, 1960s and 1970s. A more sophisticated system was installed in London's Barbican Estate in the 1960s and 1970s.

== Methodology ==
The disposal system is distinguished for its water-borne method of refuse conveyance. Conventional waste chutes convey dry refuse from individual flats. With the Garchey system, refuse (ranging from potato peelings and ashes to small bottles and tins) is collected in a unit below the sink in each residential unit through a large plug in the sink. When the refuse has accumulated in the unit and was soaked with water, it is discharged into cast iron stacks. From there it is flushed with water to central tanks for periodic removal or treatment.

Some installations of the Garchey system (e.g. Spa Green Estate) caused complaints for its tendency to produce foul smell and "bubbling back" of the refuse due to poor maintenance.

== Installations ==
In Britain

- London's Barbican Estate (1960s and 1970s)
- RAH Livett's Quarry Hill Flats (1941, demolished 1978)
- Chalkhill Estate in Wembley, London
- Park Hill Flats in Sheffield (Jack Lynn and Ivor Smith, opened 1961)
- Spa Green Estate, Clerkenwell, London

In France

- The French Garden city at du Plessis-Robinson.
- The Matrat-Voisembert property complex in Issy-les-Moulineaux (until 2005).
- Le Corbusier's Cité radieuse de Marseille.
