= 85–91 Genesta Road =

Houses in Greater London, England

Coordinates: 51.4787°N 0.0750°E

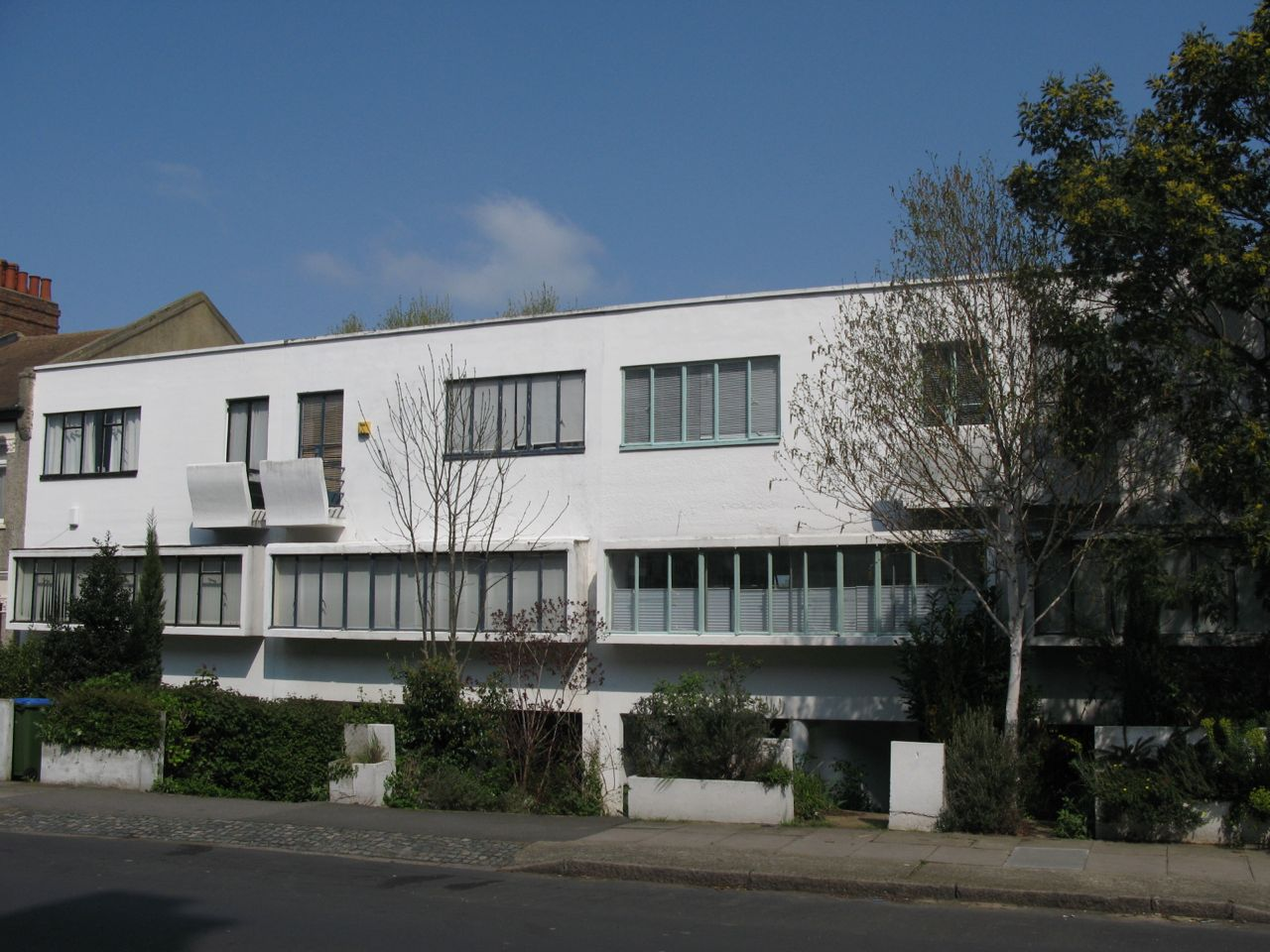
Genesta Road front elevation

85–91 Genesta Road are four terraced houses in the Royal Borough of Greenwich, located south of Plumstead, north of Shooter's Hill near Plumstead Common, and are the United Kingdom's only modernist terrace built in the 1930s, designed by the architectural pioneer Berthold Lubetkin with A. V. Pilichowski. The houses were among the first attempts to redesign the traditional English house with the benefits of concrete construction. Completed in 1934, they are listed grade II*.

85–91 Genesta Road was the first domestic project in the U.K. undertaken by Lubetkin. Built in the middle of a 19th-century terrace, the site was previously an orchard, and its principal feature is its height and the dramatic, almost precipitous fall to the north, giving views across the River Thames from the rear of the property. Neighbouring Victorian cottages overcome this site by having steps that lead up to a first floor, relegating the ground level to a basement. Lubetkin, however, placed the entrance on the ground floor, with a spiral staircase leading up to the living room. This arrangement gives full frontage to the living room and provides off-street parking next to the front door.

The bulk of the accommodation is on the first and second floors. The party walls and the intermediate columns are articulated in counterplay with the horizontal concrete window band that projects at living room level. Relieving curves at the entrance and the cyma bedroom balconies are typical characteristics of Lubetkin's work, occurring in other buildings such as Highpoint I.
