= Finsbury Health Centre =

Grade I listed building in London

Coordinates: 51°31′30″N 0°06′32″W

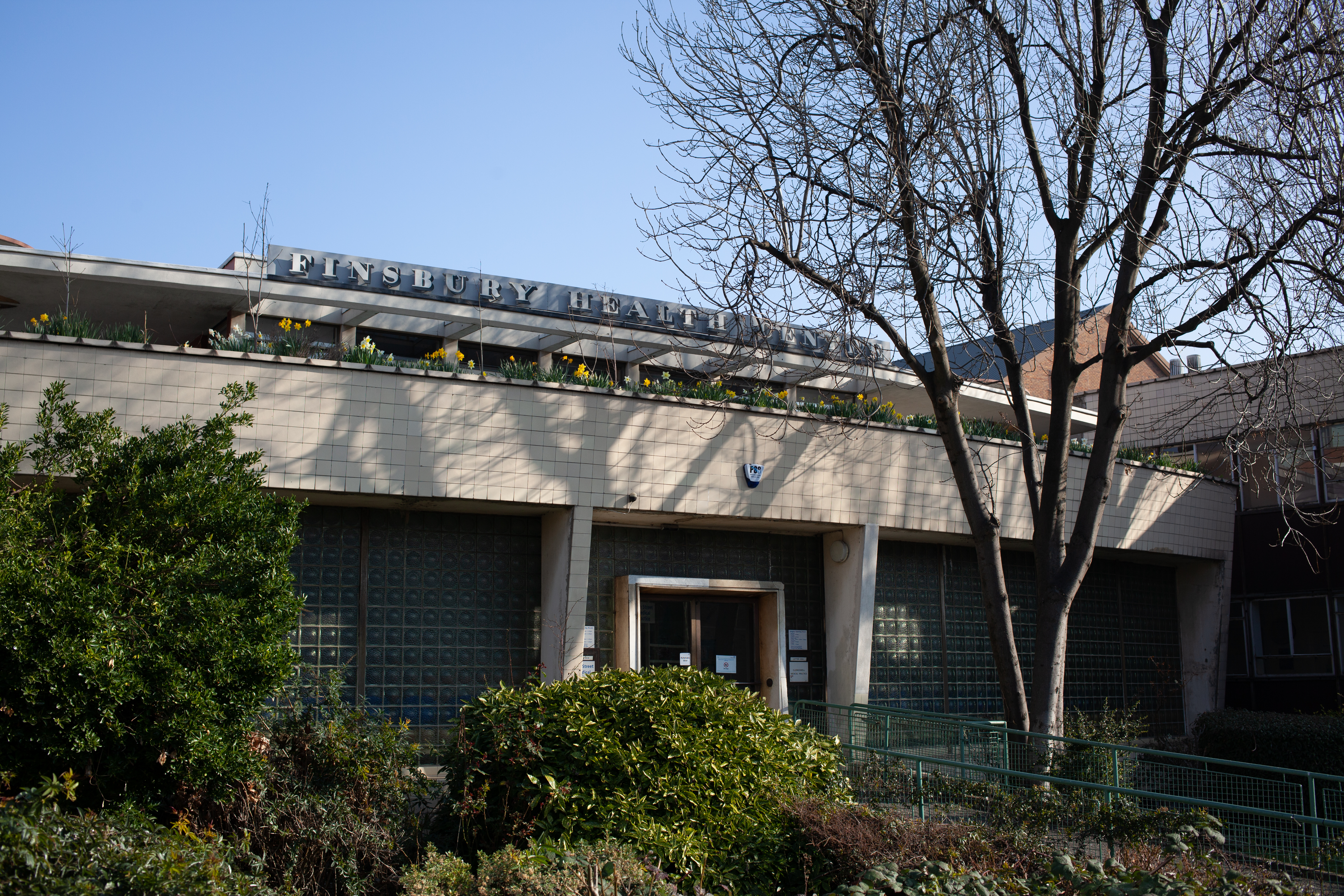
Finsbury Health Centre

The Finsbury Health Centre is in Clerkenwell, north London. It was built in 1935–38, designed by Berthold Lubetkin and the Tecton architecture practice. The design shares some of its materials and detailing with similar Lubetkin projects of the period, including the Priory Green, Spa Green and Hallfield Estates.

Partly restored in the mid-1990s, the building is Grade I listed.

Services housed at the centre include the Michael Palin Centre for Stammering and Clerkenwell Medical Practice.

== See also ==
- Healthcare in London
- Finsbury, this district, not to be confused with Finsbury Park
