= Chalkhill Estate =

Public housing project in London UK

Coordinates: 51.564°N 0.270°W

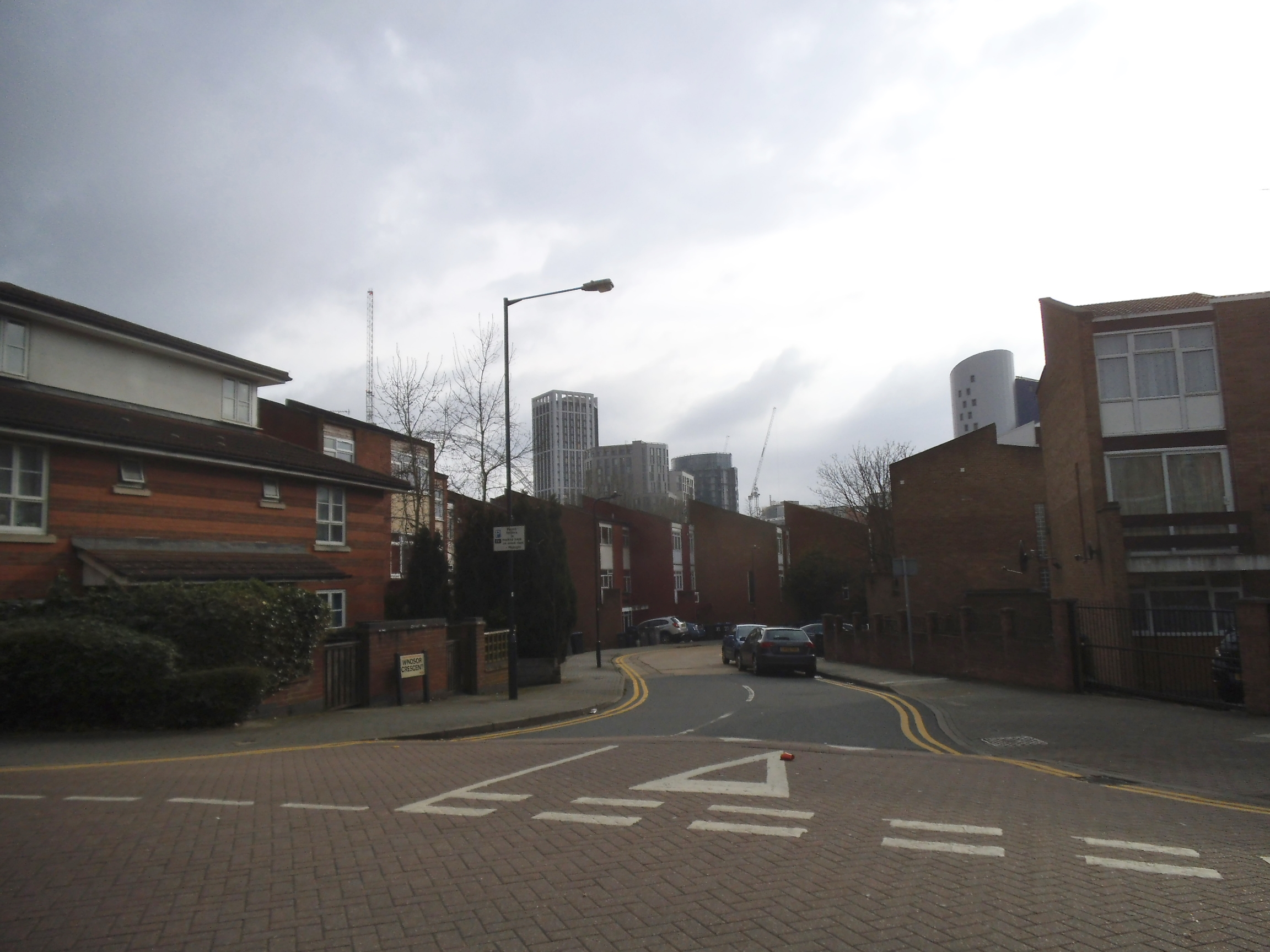
Inside the western part of the estate, with new built developments of Wembley Park seen in the background

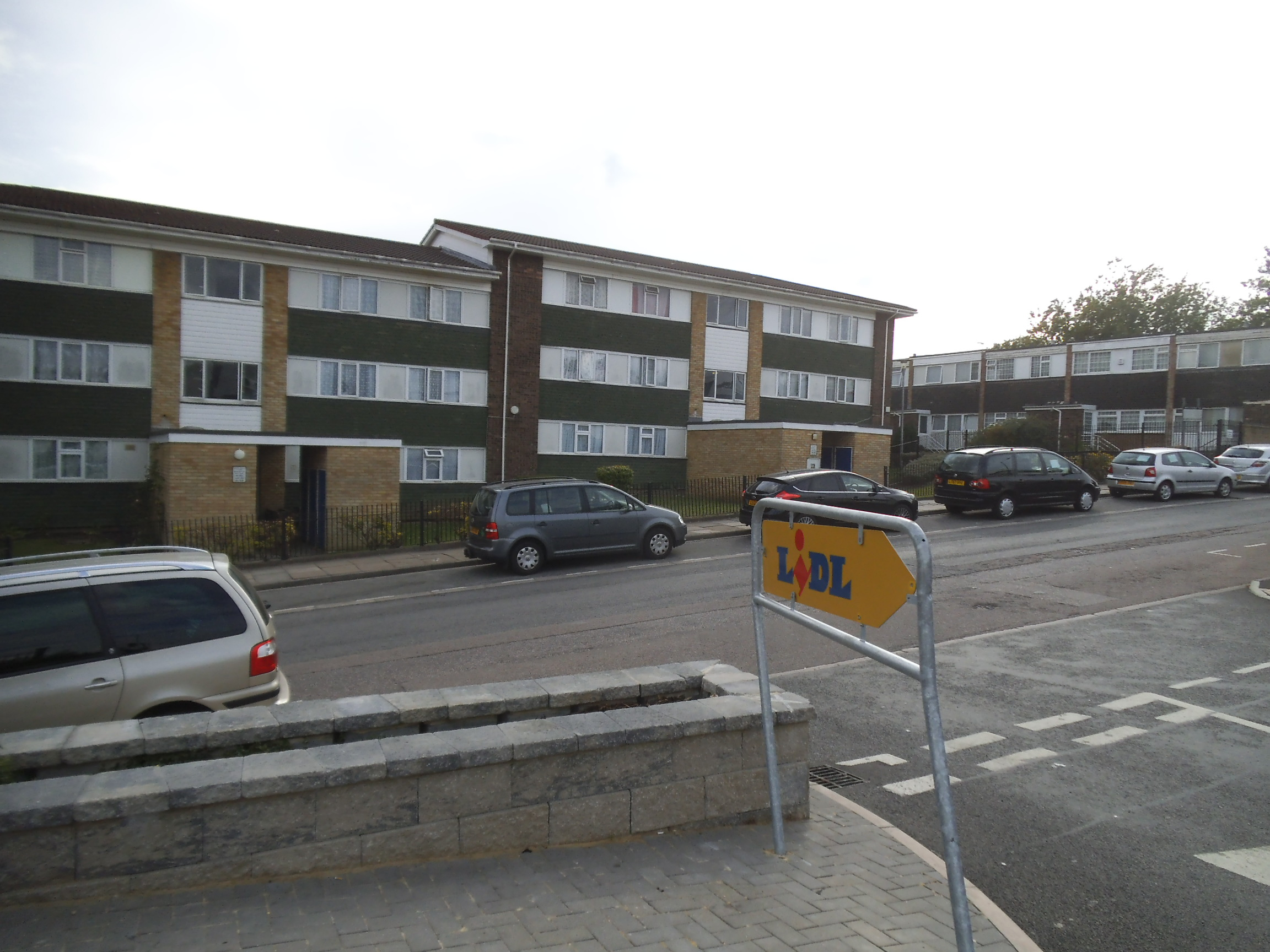
Flats on the eastern side of Chalkhill Estate

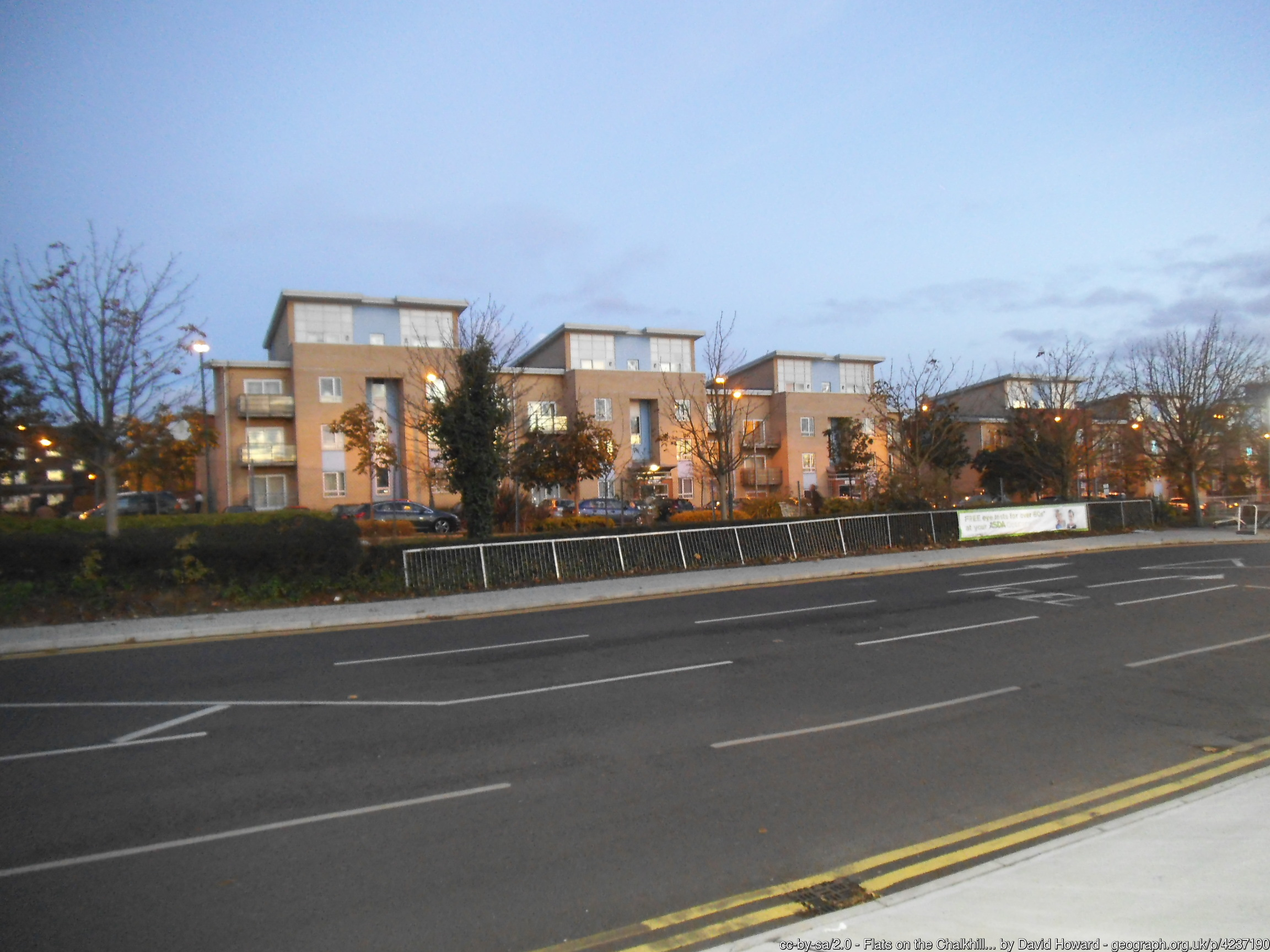
Flats on the Chalkhill Estate

Chalkhill Estate is located in the Wembley Park area of north-west London. It was originally one of three large council estates built in the London Borough of Brent by the early 1970s, along with Stonebridge and South Kilburn. The design was based on that of Park Hill in Sheffield. The high-rise estate was demolished by 2000 and gradually replaced by new low-rise builds.

== Location ==
The estate is located just east of Wembley Park tube station and adjacent of the former Brent Town Hall. It is divided from the Stadium Industrial Estate and the developments around Wembley Stadium because of the Metropolitan line/Jubilee line/Chiltern Main Line railway tracks to the south. The Stadium area and also Neasden to the east are still easily accessible through the main roads - Bridge Road, Forty Lane, and Blackbird Hill, the latter of which forms part of the NW9 postcode.

== Political basis ==
The acquisition of the land to build the Chalkhill Estate was one of the first examples of eminent domain, or compulsory purchase. Many larger semi-detached and detached houses with large gardens lining the road opposite Brent Town Hall were demolished to build Chalkhill. This led to charges of a deliberate manipulation of area demographics so that Brent North – traditionally Conservative voting – would become a marginal parliamentary constituency, with the goal of a Labour-controlled council returning a Labour MP. This proved to be incorrect as Rhodes Boyson, a Conservative, was returned as MP from 1974 until 1997.

== Establishment ==
The original high-rise developments at Chalkhill Estate, seen here in 1970, were demolished in 1997

Chalkhill was originally a manor in the ancient parish of Kingsbury in the county of Middlesex. Chalkhill Estate was then developed as a Metroland estate from 1921, but it was between 1966 and 1970 that the high density, high-rise council estate providing flats, shops, a medical centre, car parking and open space was built.

Dwellings consisted of single-storey one and two-bedroom flats, and larger two-storey family homes. The high-rise blocks were linked via high-floor open walkways, called "walkways in the sky". Walkways were affectionately named Goldbeaters Walk, Greenrigg Walk, Redcliffe Walk and Bluebird Walk.

In total there were about 1900 houses and flats. Chalkhill Estate also contained recreational facilities for children and the elderly, such as playgrounds and seating areas with flower beds, much like a public park.

All dwellings had what was quite modern technology at the time, including central heating and "Garchey" systems (a waste-disposal machine in the kitchen sink).

== Reputation and decline ==
Chalkhill Estate in 1970

In its initial years, Chalkhill Estate was viewed as one of the finest housing projects of Britain. By the late-1970s, however, crime was taking root. Local shops were frequently robbed. The neighbourhood around Chalkhill was deteriorating, and criminal activities in the area soon seeped into the estate. The praised "walkways in the sky" became convenient quick escape routes for criminals.

Milkmen, who had previously delivered to residents' doors, had to restrict operations due to the uptick of robberies. The buildings were decaying. Lifts weren't always operational, and the ones that worked often had a stench of urine. Residents had no other option but to walk up dozens of flights of poorly lit concrete stairs. The two high-rise car parks were just as dangerous, rife with car thefts and drug deals.

The recreational facilities suffered as well. Children's play areas, such as the paddling pool and sandpit, became unsafe due to the prevalence of broken glass. The flower beds and seating areas for the elderly were destroyed as fast as they were repaired. Gradually these facilities were decommissioned or replaced, only to be vandalised once again.

The 1980s brought safety initiatives such as door entry systems and walkway closures, but did little to deter crime and overall deterioration. By the 1990s, Chalkhill Estate (along with several other local housing estates) was infested with drugs and gangs.

== Redevelopment ==
The current Chalkhill estate has experienced a major modernisation that matches the rest of Wembley Park. New buildings and modernised architecture replaced the estate.

The 1,900 houses and flats were demolished in 1997, and a new low-rise estate was planned as replacement. Some of the old estate land was sold to Asda, who then built a large supermarket that opened in March 1999.

The first phase of the new low-rise estate was completed in 2000 and the final homes completed in 2003. The full project was not completed until 2009, when the Welford community centre and its adjacent apartments were ready for occupancy.

Despite the new layout and buildings, crime remained and gang presence increased. Multiple Chalkhill-area gangs arose, such as Crack Hill Mob and Chalk Hill Boys. The Press Road Crew remained notorious for crime in Chalkhill and surrounding areas. In 2003, seven members of the gang, with 100 convictions between them, were issued ASBOs. Rivalry between the Press Road Crew and South Kilburn gangs resulted in the murder of 29-year-old Jason Greene in 2006.

There was an increase in reported incidents of youth robberies, shootings, and drug raids on the revamped estate throughout 2009–10. In January 2010, a young man was shot on the estate and left with a fractured skull after an incident on Chalkhill Road.

In 2011, three high-ranking members of a £20m drugs network, which included Charlotte Church's former lover Kyle Johnson, were jailed for a total of 22 years. During the police operation, £6m worth of heroin was recovered from a home on Chalkhill Road and in a nearby flat.

Despite all the criminal elements that have plagued Chalkhill, some aspects are seeing improvement. The high-achieving Chalkhill Primary School and Chalkhill Park (completed in 2012) have garnered praise, and a local cafe called The Lounge was unexpectedly voted the best restaurant in all of London on TripAdvisor in 2018.

== Culture ==
Chalkhill Community Radio was launched in 2018. Love Chalkhill Festival is a public annual summer event.

=== Notable residents ===
- Sophie Okonedo
- Lady Sovereign
