= Spa Green Estate =

Housing estate in Clerkenwell, London

Coordinates: 51.5288°N 0.1055°W

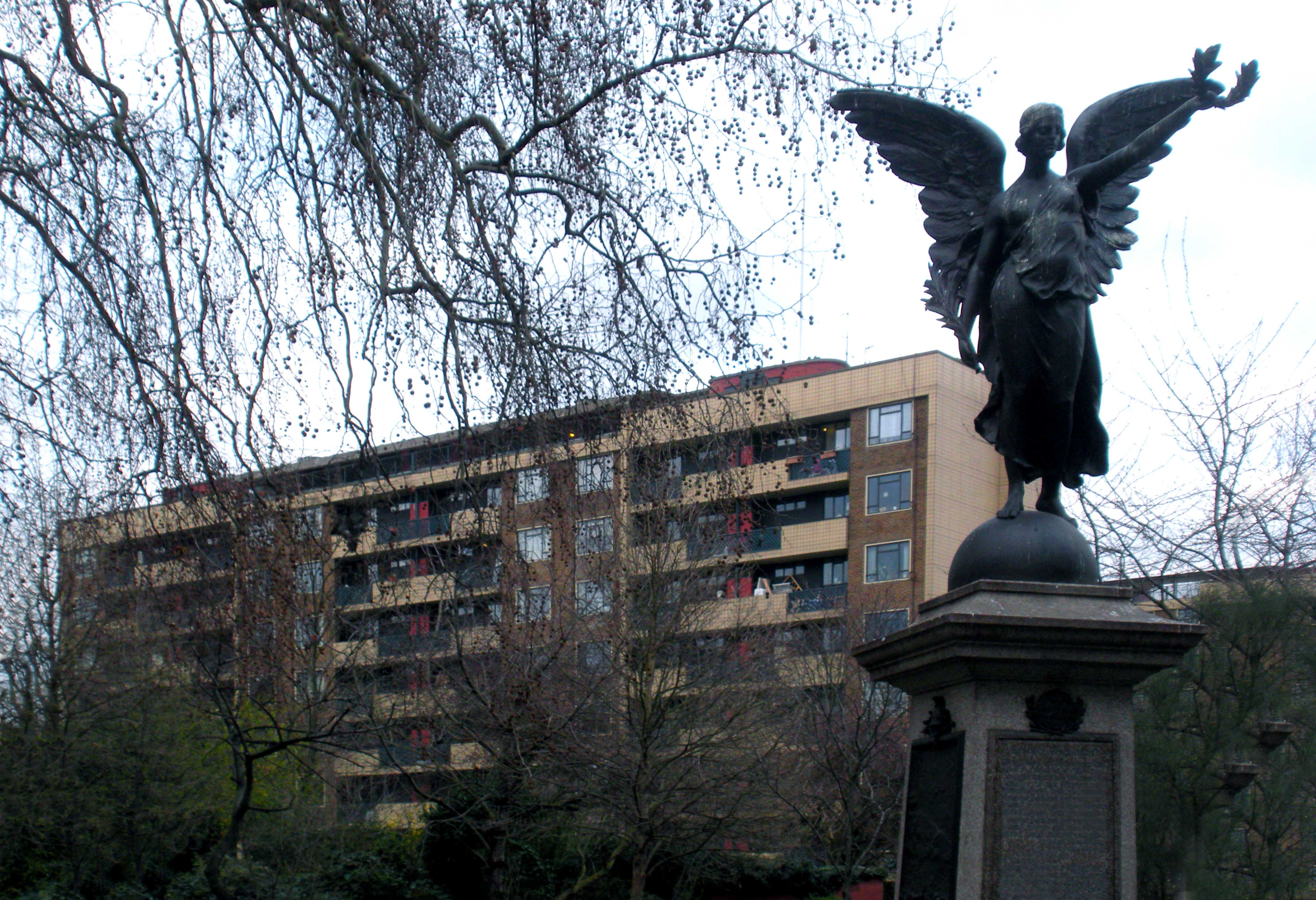
Wells House from Spa Green Park

Spa Green Estate between Rosebery Avenue and St John St in Clerkenwell, London EC1, England, is the most complete post-war realisation of a 1930s radical plan for social regeneration through Modernist architecture. Conceived as public housing, it is now a mixed community of private owners and council tenants, run by a resident-elected management organization. In 1998 this work by the architect Berthold Lubetkin received a Grade II* listing for its architectural significance, and the major 2008 restoration brought back the original colour scheme, which recalls Lubetkin's contacts with Russian Constructivism.

== History and siting ==
Medical and political leaders in the then Metropolitan Borough of Finsbury worked with the equally radical Lubetkin and his practice Tecton (which by the time of Spa Green's completion in 1949 had regrouped as Skinner, Bailey & Lubetkin). The nearby Finsbury Health Centre (1938) emblematized the future welfare state and featured in a wartime poster by Abram Games, Your Britain: Fight For it Now. In Spa Green, first designed in 1938 and developed in 1943, Tecton aimed to fulfill this utopian promise.

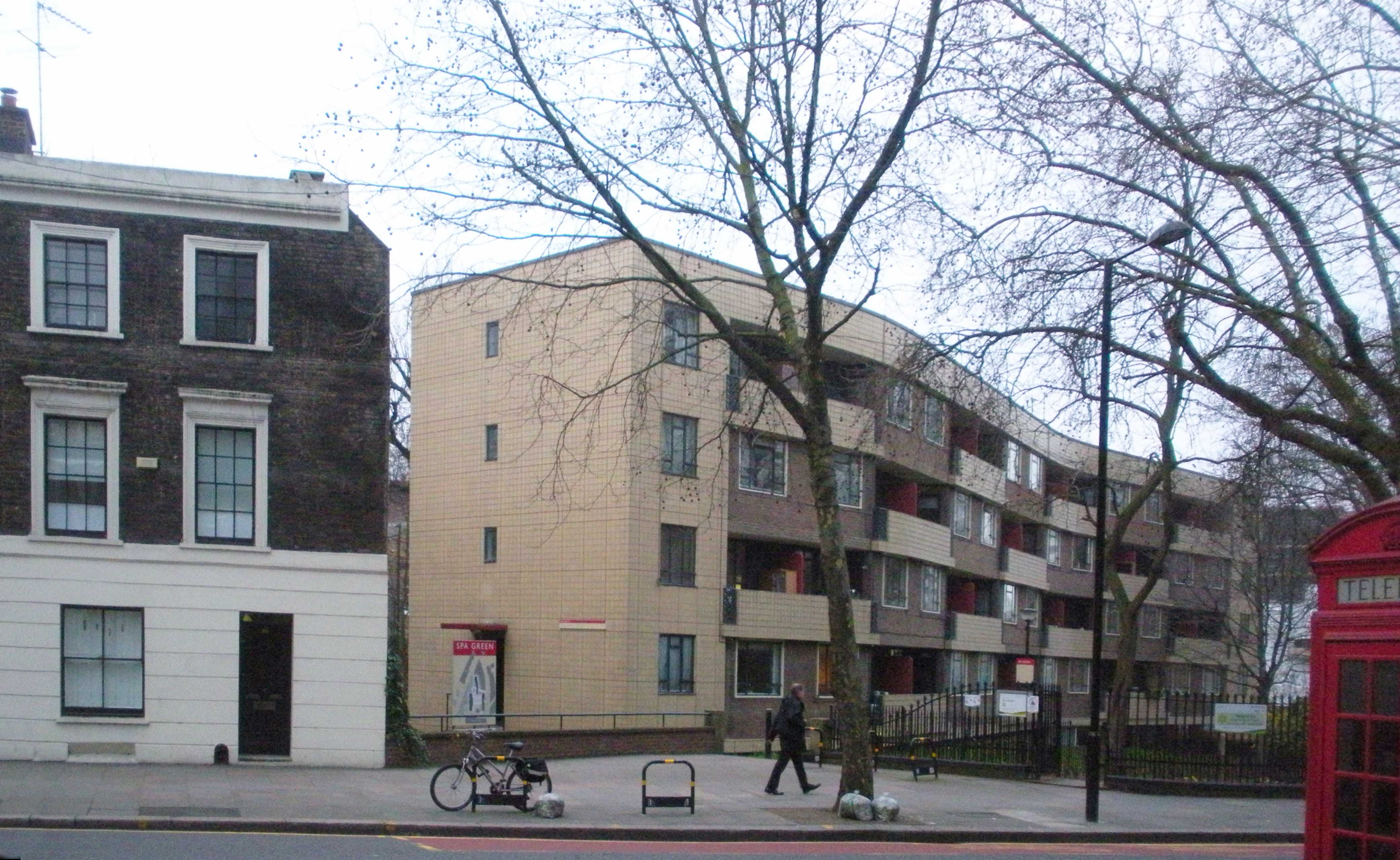
Sadler House from Rosebery Avenue

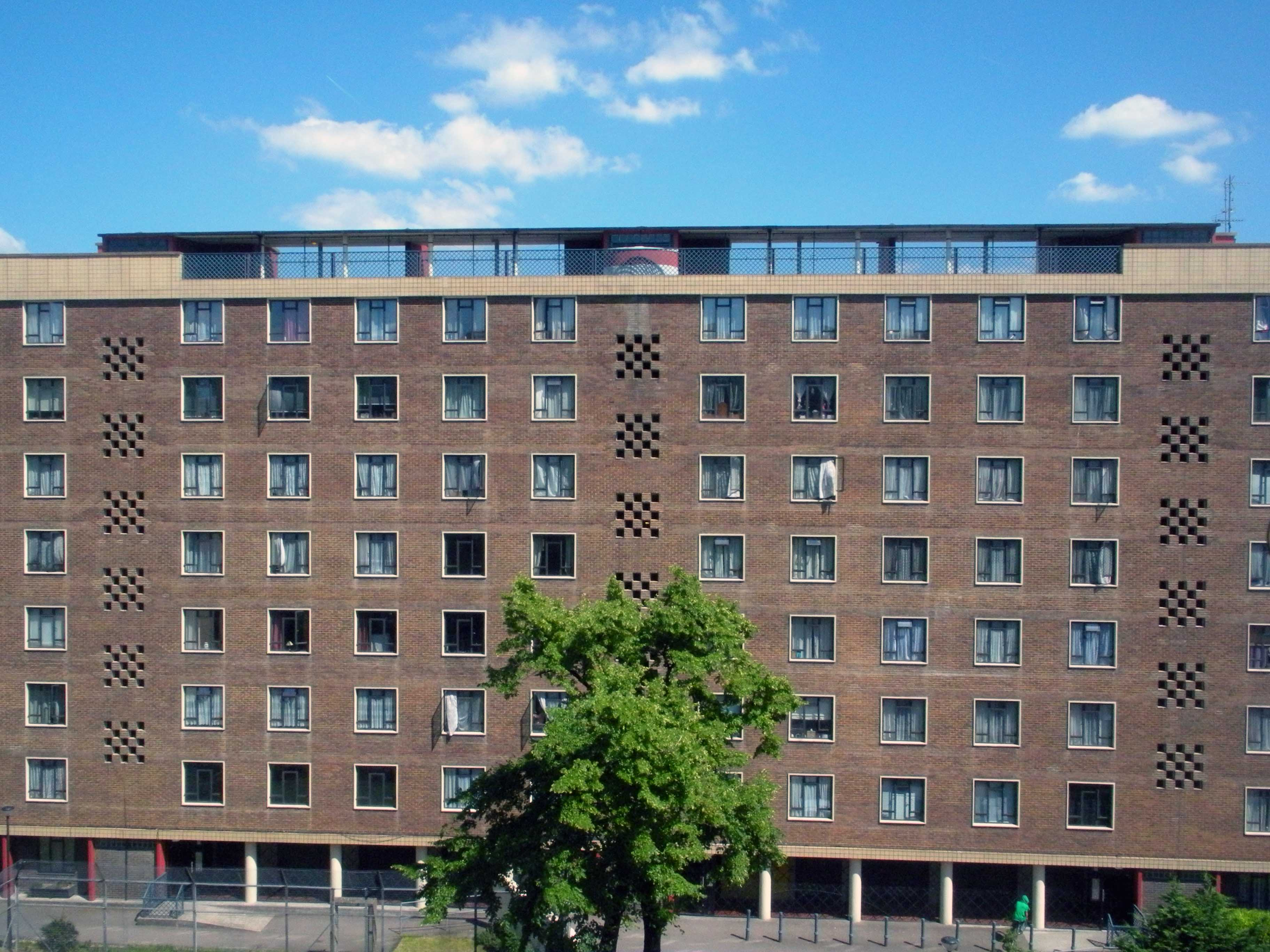
Tunbridge House bedroom façade

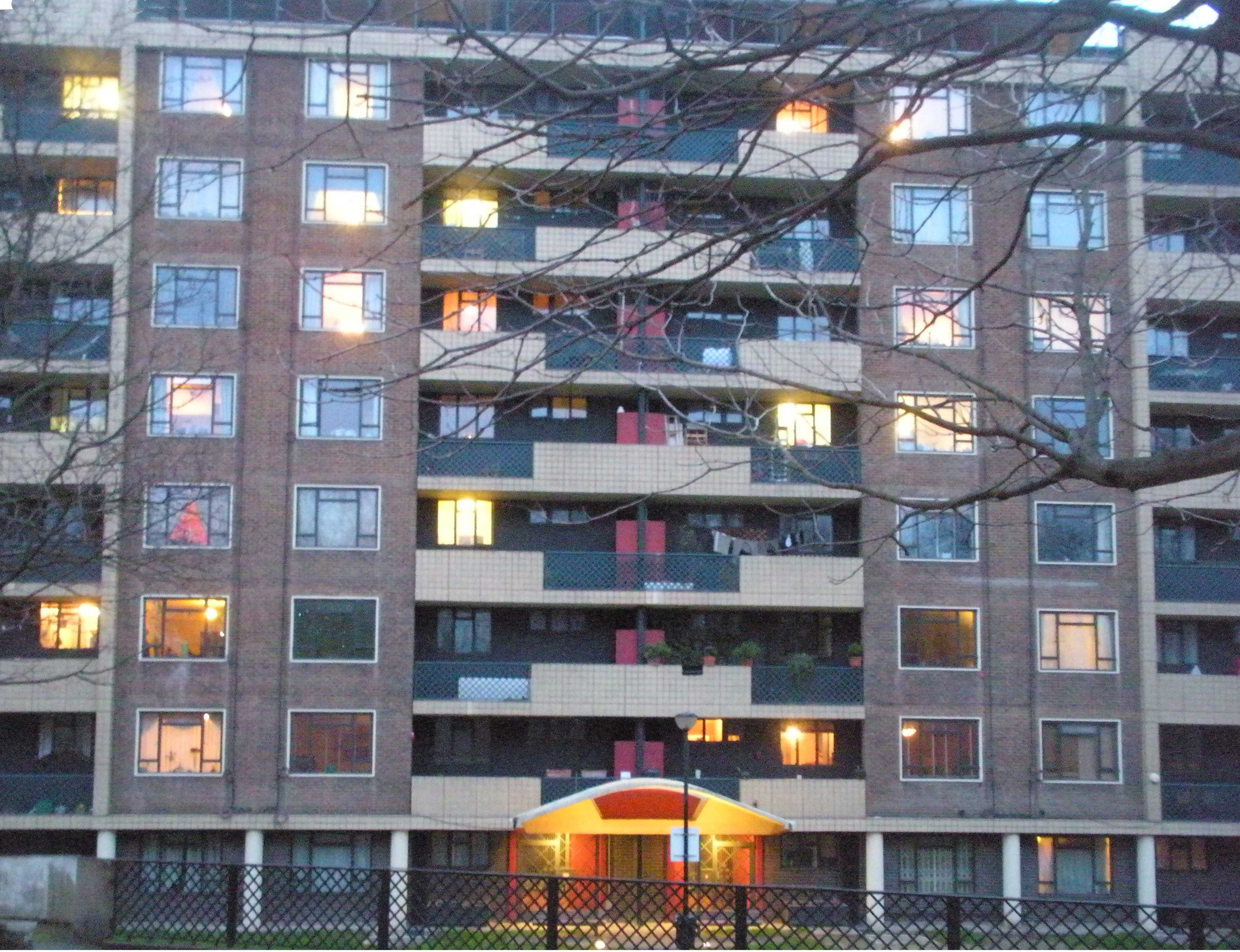
balcony façade

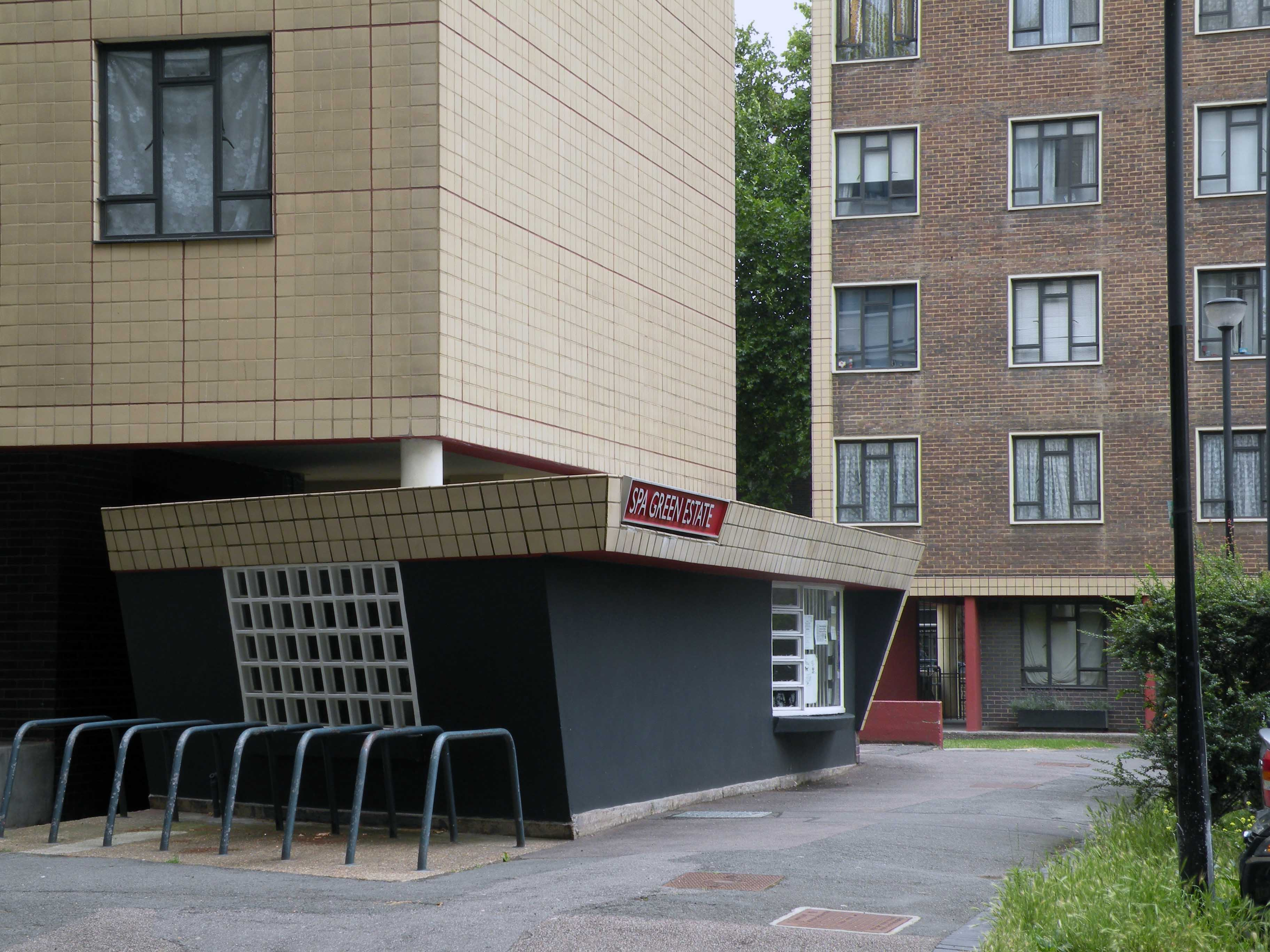
Meeting Lodge at corner of Sadler House

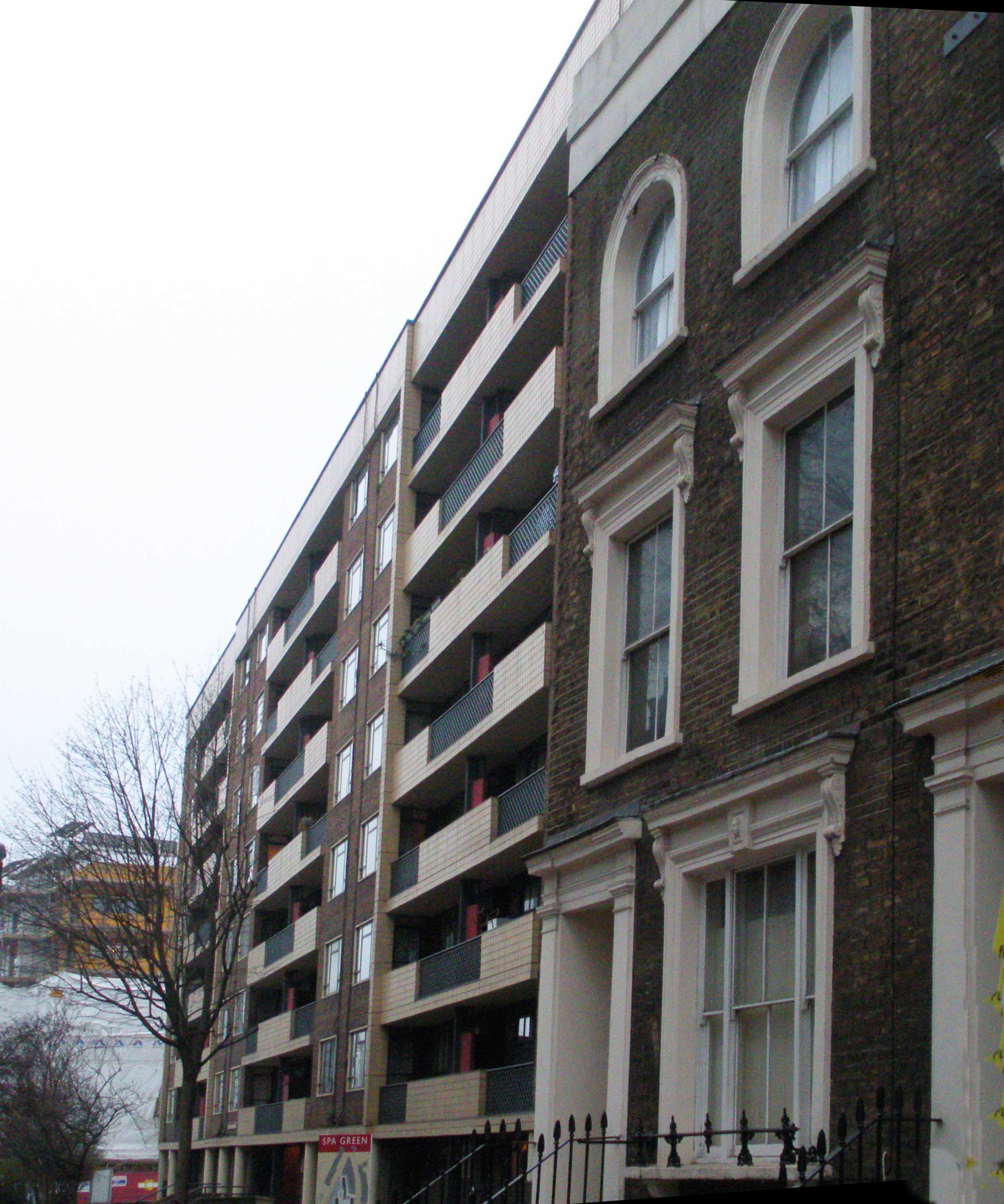
Tunbridge House balcony façade from St John St

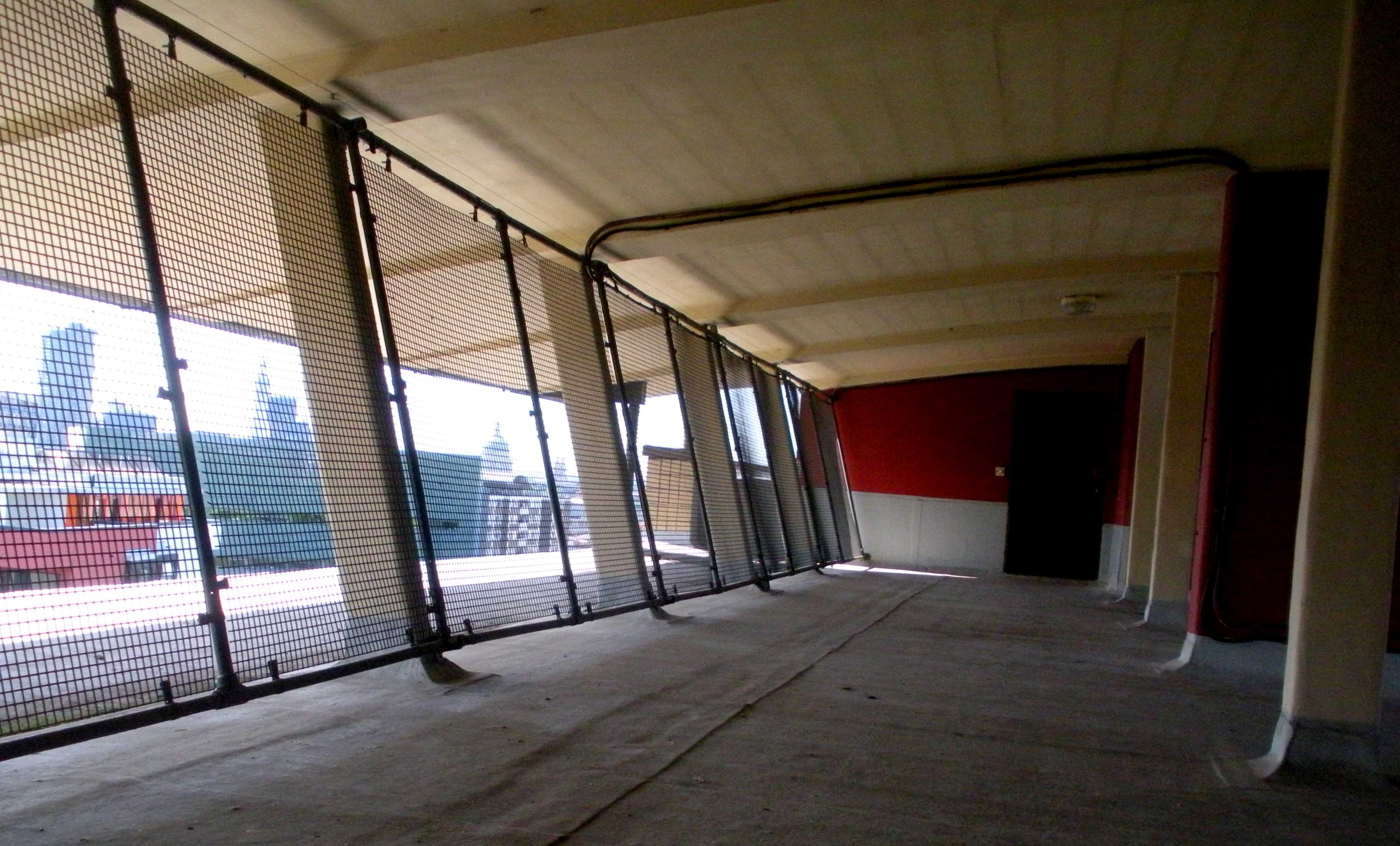
Wells House wind-roof

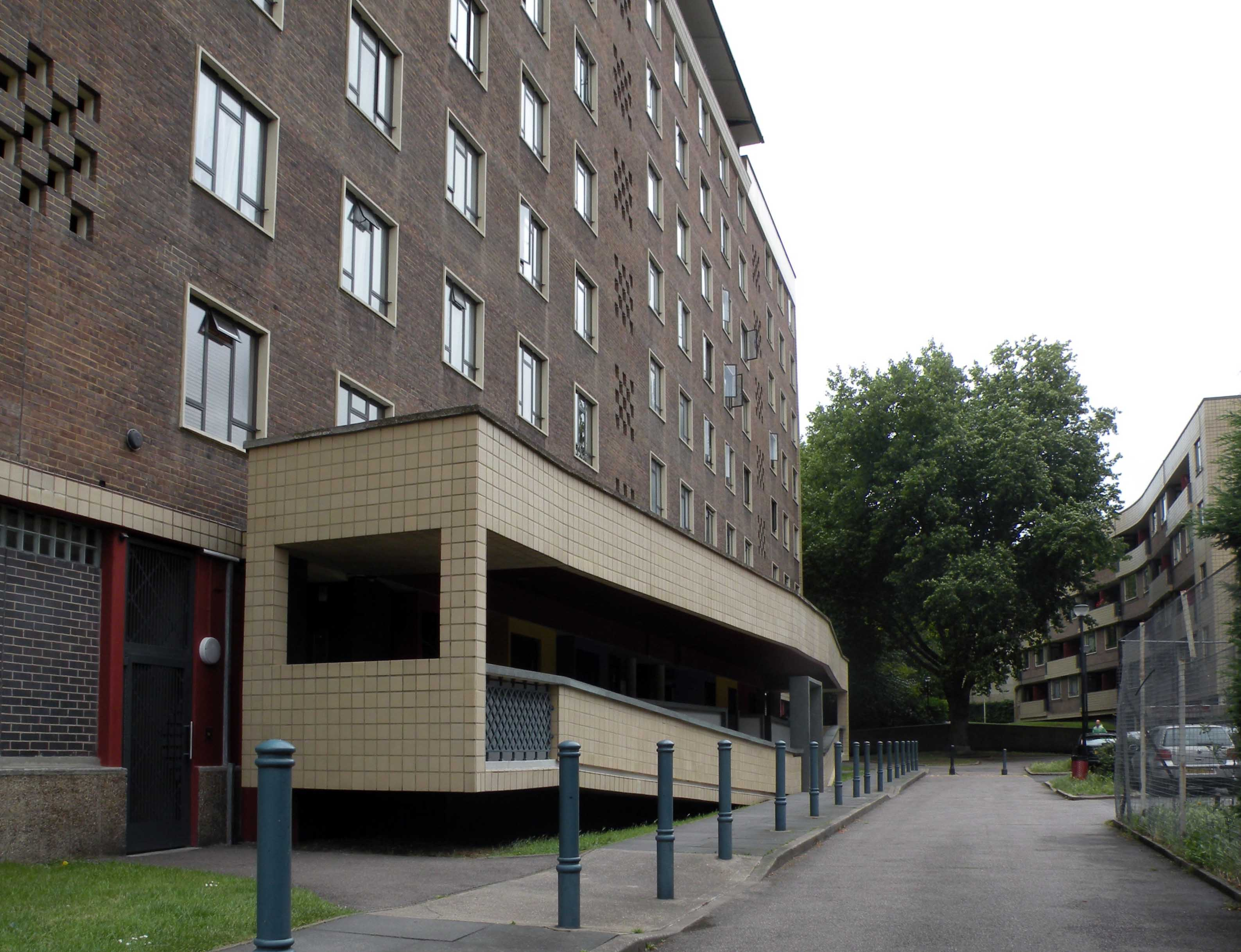
Wells House ramped entrance

The Minister of Health Aneurin Bevan (familiarly known as "Nye") laid the foundation stone in July 1946, and the opening ceremonies in 1949 (witnessed by some residents who still live in Spa Green) included the planting of the plane tree that still dominates one entrance, by Princess Margaret.

The area of the current Estate - opposite Sadler's Wells Theatre, flanked by the small Spa Green park, and formerly the site of Islington Spa or New Tunbridge Wells – had been designated for slum clearance and then partly demolished by German bombing. The park screens the estate from Rosebery Avenue and provides tranquil, oblique entry sequences. The entire site is included in the New River Conservation Area.

Lubetkin intended this project as a manifesto for modern architecture, rational but also exciting: 'we will deliberately create exhilaration'.

Spa Green adapted for working families many features from Lubetkin's luxury Highpoint flats, including lifts, central heating, balconies, daylight and ventilation from multiple directions, large entry spaces, and a roof terrace. Well designed fitted kitchens, including slide-away breakfast counters and ironing boards, electrical and gas appliances, and a central waste-disposal system in stainless steel, exceeded the amenities enjoyed by most of the population in the austere late 1940s. Ove Arup’s innovative concrete box-frame or 'egg-crate' construction gave each flat clear views and interiors uncluttered by beams, columns, or pipes, while his aerodynamic 'wind-roofs' and open terraces provided a communal area for drying clothes, social gathering and enjoying views of St Paul's Cathedral, the Old Bailey and the Houses of Parliament.

Two parallel blocks of eight storeys (Tunbridge and Wells Houses) define a central plaza, which also contains a single-storey nursery school (of later date, but conceived in the original design). Sadler House, four storeys becoming five as the land drops away, runs in a sinuous curve between this plaza and the extant terrace houses of Rosebery Avenue. (Originally this smaller block had staircases but no lifts, though these were later added together with a semicircular external stair tower that breaks the line of the rear entrance-galleries.) One-storey service buildings complete the ensemble, all but the bicycle sheds still extant.

Lubetkin's design made sure that everyone had a balcony on the street side. Quieter bedroom windows on the inner side look at the bedroom façade in the mirroring building across the plaza. (Though differentiated at ground and roof level, Tunbridge and Wells Houses otherwise repeat one another in reverse.) No resident is overshadowed by another. Bedrooms vary from one to three but there is no internal hierarchy of front and back, nor of flats with ‘good’ views and those with less privileged situations.

=== Betty Knight ===
In 2014 Tunbridge Wells had placed a memorial plaque in the memory of Betty Knight for all her work within the community. In 2010 Betty received a special Mayoral award at Islington Town Hall for all her outstanding work in the community. Betty Knight played an important role within the Spa Green Estates Tenant Management Association (TMO) which was launched in 1995. Betty Knight initially said that before the TMO the estate was filthy and was covered in graffiti and it is the job of the estates residents to become part of their community and to be able to change situations, people need to get involved in the management.

== Architecture in context ==
Spa Green has been eulogized by architects and historians before and after its Grade II* listing in 1998. ‘Rightly listed’, John Allan remarks, ‘the first and best of Lubetkin and Tecton’s post-war housing schemes set a standard in architectural and technical accomplishment unmatched by any contemporary. Over half a century later Spa Green still radiates a sense of optimism that defies the commonplace dismissal of flatted estates as a modern urban aberration.’ For Peter Coe and Malcolm Reading, ‘the success of the Estate proved the relevance of an ordered and comprehensive investigation into the lives of those for whom the housing was being designed’. James Payne concludes that ‘Spa Green remains exceptional for its success at an urban level, managing to combine the idea and scale of the London street and square with the modernist object in the park landscape.’ Nikolaus Pevsner called it ‘the most innovative public housing in England at the time’ and praised the ‘visual kick’ of the balconies, porches and façades, though he did grumble that ‘the buildings are placed in any old direction’. Spa Green embodies the qualities that the architect Richard Meier praises in Lubetkin: ‘a search for harmony, a rational procedure, a precision of detail, constructional integrity, a respect for human scale, and, most importantly, “the expression of faith in ideology … and the creation of architecture that contained a message for the future”’. Lubetkin’s declaration ‘Nothing is too good for ordinary people’ is still the motto of the Estate.

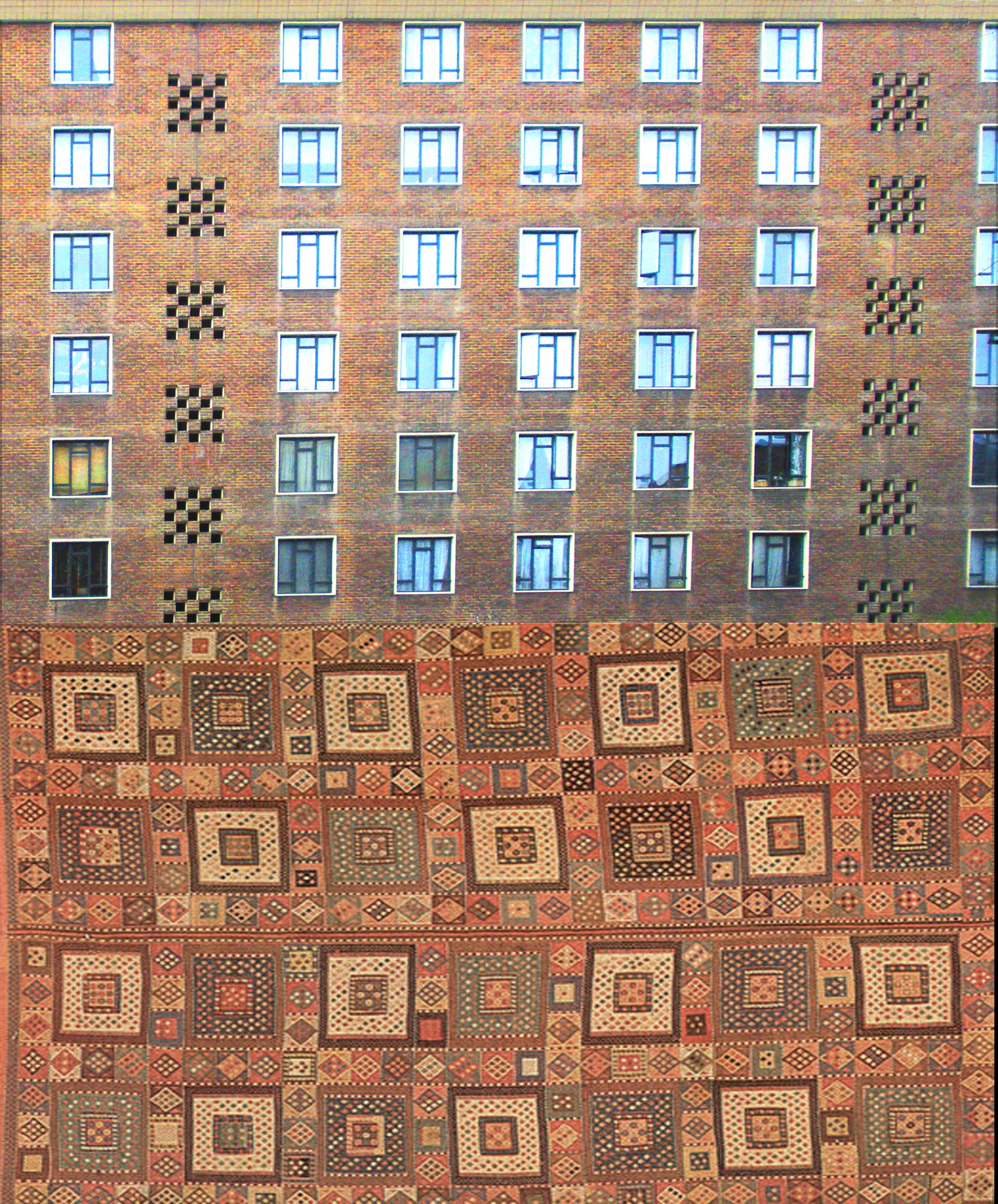
Bedroom façade and Verneh kilim. Lubetkin explained that this kind of Caucasian fabric inspired his chequerboard facade.

The taller buildings have two sharply differentiated façades corresponding to the rhythms of the day. On the inner plaza side bedrooms (also used for reading or sewing, as Lubetkin noted) form a calm chequerboard design derived from his study of textiles and particularly from the Caucasian kilim known as Verneh. The side facing the street, equally rectilinear, offers a suitably vibrant syncopated pattern of grouped windows and balconies, themselves divided into alternating halves of cream tile and cast-iron railing, a trellis-like grid rotated 45 degrees also used for the fence separating the Estate from Spa Green park. The drama is accentuated by the colour, India red picking out the flanges that divide each balcony (and conceal the fire-escape stairs in the taller blocks), deep slate grey on the back walls giving an illusion of greater depth. (In elevation drawings preserved by the RIBA, this chiaroscuro is emphasized by brilliant white and black with no mid-tones.) Among other complexities of the balcony elevation, Allan cites ‘the way the central tiled frame is widened to contain a double stack of windows, thereby centring the composition, when in fact the left-hand set belong to the flats outside the frame’ (Berthold Lubetkin, p. 108). Both the taller façades are further enlivened by clerestories of glass brick marking the three entry halls and their corresponding lift housings, which punctuate the roof terrace and form beacons at night. The narrow side elevations, unfenestrated cream tile, are variegated by red accents including a windowpane check.

Sadler House is configured differently, with open gallery entries at the quiet rear. Bedroom and living room both belong to the lively balcony side, another variation on the contrapuntal balcony-railing-window rhythm.

Accusations of ‘facadism’ seem dated, given how many Constructivist-influenced features of Spa Green have become staples of postmodern architecture – not only the floating roof canopy but the red/grey colour scheme, the stairwells marked by repeated clusters of square 'windows', and the acute-angled canted meeting lodge (originally the caretaker's flat), which emerges from Sadler House surreally fitted with traditional multipane and bow windows. Lubetkin's decorative Modernism is surprisingly contextualist, establishing visual continuity with the extant terraces (whose rusticated stucco is echoed in the small service building adjoining St John St). Already in 1945 Lubetkin explained the S-curve of the future Sadler House as meant to create 'a more organic link' to the Rosebery Avenue terrace houses. This carefully studied siting of the buildings obviates Pevsner's complaint about randomness.

Within this overall orthogonal scheme, expressed in both plan and elevation since the buildings run parallel, experiments in curvature – parabolas, aerofoil sections, cylinders, ‘piano’ and ‘tear-drop’ forms - recur in the landscaping and in the entry ramps and porches. The raised drum that preserved an existing tree in the plaza is echoed, inversely, in the sunken circular bed around Princess Margaret's tree. In Wells House the vestibule entries are given an ‘aerodynamic’ inward curvature, and the horizontal parabola around the foundation stone in the east porch corresponds to the vertical parabola of the west porch. Sadler House itself takes on a serpentine form, perhaps alluding to the sinuous Rydon Crescent that once occupied this site (Survey of London, vol. 47, pp. 98–99). The most striking of these curvilinear forms crown the roofs of the two taller blocks, designed with the help of an aerodynamics specialist to produce a constant breeze for drying laundry. These two ‘wind-roofs’ are each different (though identical in the model), Tunbridge's being a slender canopy while Wells's thrusts out over the plaza and curves like an aircraft wing. In dialogue with Lubetkin's own Highpoint and Le Corbusier's Marseilles Unité d’Habitation, these graceful roof canopies in turn influenced many high-rise buildings, most immediately the coarser and more massive Finsbury Estate nearby (by another original Tecton member, Carl Ludwig Franck).

At entry level, the elaborate double-ramped loggia of Wells House achieves the Corbusian effect of lifting the building from the ground. (Lubetkin himself derived these ramps from the entries of Russian churches visited as a child.) This double ramp, originally intended for prams and WWII veterans with wheelchairs still fascinates children.

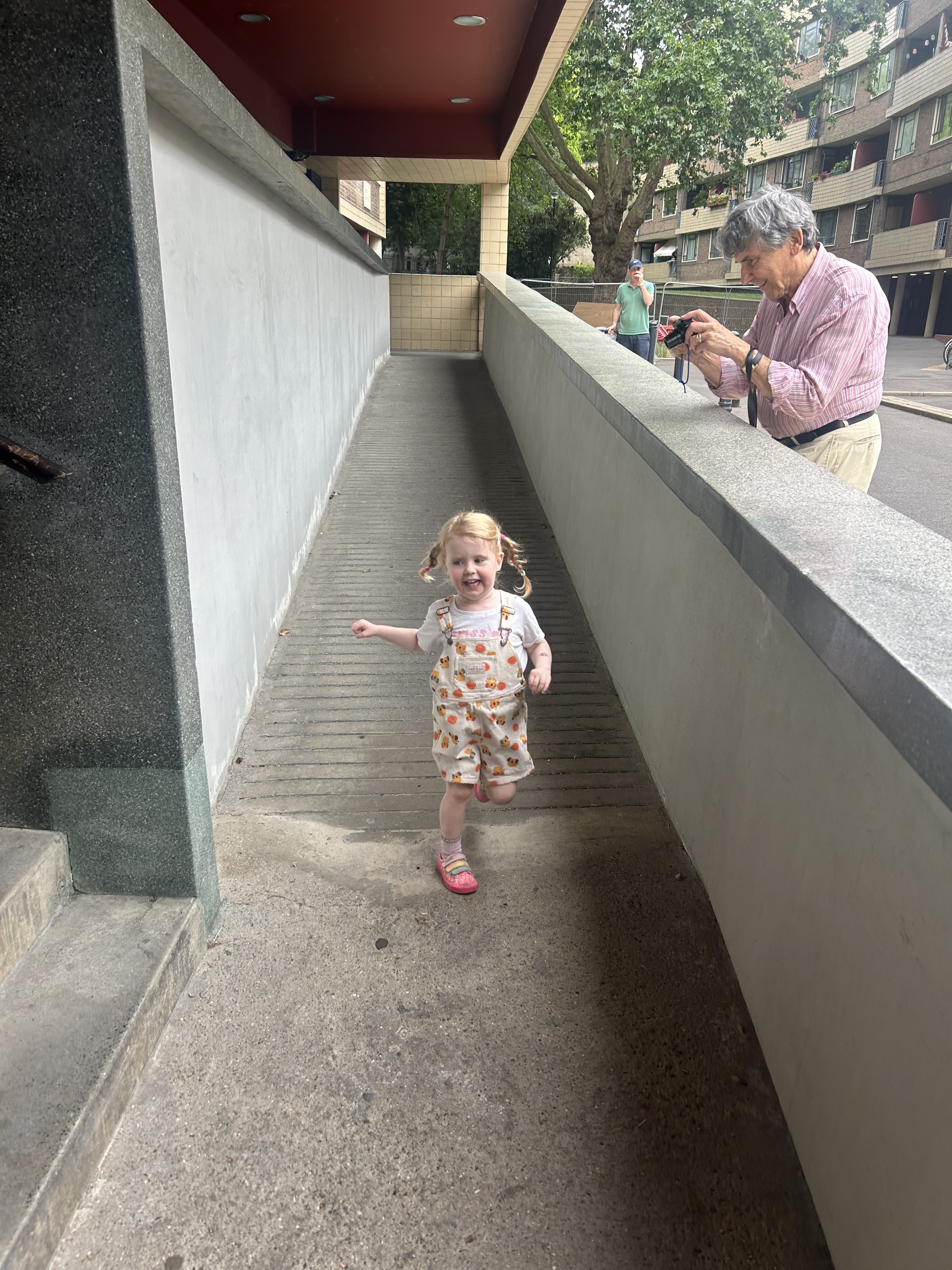
'We will deliberately create exhilaration' (Lubetkin)

The impression of flotation is enhanced by the landscaping – which seems to launch Sadler House into flight – and by the use of blue-grey brick for the ground-floor cladding, recessed behind lighter pilotis, in contrast to light red brick above.

The brightly lit interiors, as mentioned, have the bedrooms on the ‘quiet’ side and a spacious living-room with direct access to the balcony; kitchen, separate WC and bathroom give onto this private recessed space. Kitchen and living room are linked by a large serving hatch/dresser with double doors. The sequence of bedroom walls is staggered relative to the bathroom-kitchen-living room side, providing diagonal views that increase the sensation of space. This effect is particularly striking in the direct connection from living room to the third bedroom. Precast concrete window-frames project externally and internally; their bevelled or splayed profile (repeated in the free-standing rectangular 'triumphal arch' at the entry) again accentuates the space and light.

== Refurbishment ==
Piecemeal refurbishments in the 1980s, when the estate needed repairs and upgrades, included painting, retiling and a secure entry system with ironwork that plays variations on Lubetkin's trellis grille. Central heating was extended to all rooms, and some residents tore out the canted-frame fireplaces and steel sinks with Garchey disposal units. After the Grade II* listing of Spa Green in 1998, Homes for Islington with English Heritage initiated a restoration of the entire exterior plus the kitchens and bathrooms of the flats still in council ownership. Deteriorated concrete was recast, windows replaced with double-glazed steel Critall units resembling the originals (though with thicker frames), and Lubetkin's colours reconstructed – with some wilder primary colours at the entry level.

This restoration, generally praised for re-establishing the original appearance and reversing the ‘visual chaos’ of individual owners’ window-alterations, did stir controversy. Criticism focused on the high cost and the alleged lack of input from residents, while an internal report documents problems with the workmanship and materials of the roofs and the council-tenanted bathrooms. But overall this restoration was hailed, in Britain and internationally, as 'a great success': Manolo Guerci, in the Turin Giornale dell'architettura, called it a 'winning model' of 'urban integration' and 'quality of detail'.

Comparison with Tecton's drawings in the RIBA collection reveals that, with a few exceptions, the external appearance and internal layout of Spa Green have been restored as closely as possible to Lubetkin's original vision – an 'exhilarating' architecture of civic responsibility and aesthetic pleasure. In 2012 new landscaping designed by Alison Peters improved the central plaza. Spa Green Estate drew many visitors during London's Open City/Open House in September 2012. By 2025, however, the external paintwork of the balcony walls and railings has faded and chipped; the London Borough of Islington drew up plans for a thorough cleaning and repainting, but these plans have stalled for over a year.
