= Tecton Group =

Influential architectural collaboration of architects based in Britain (1932 - 1939)

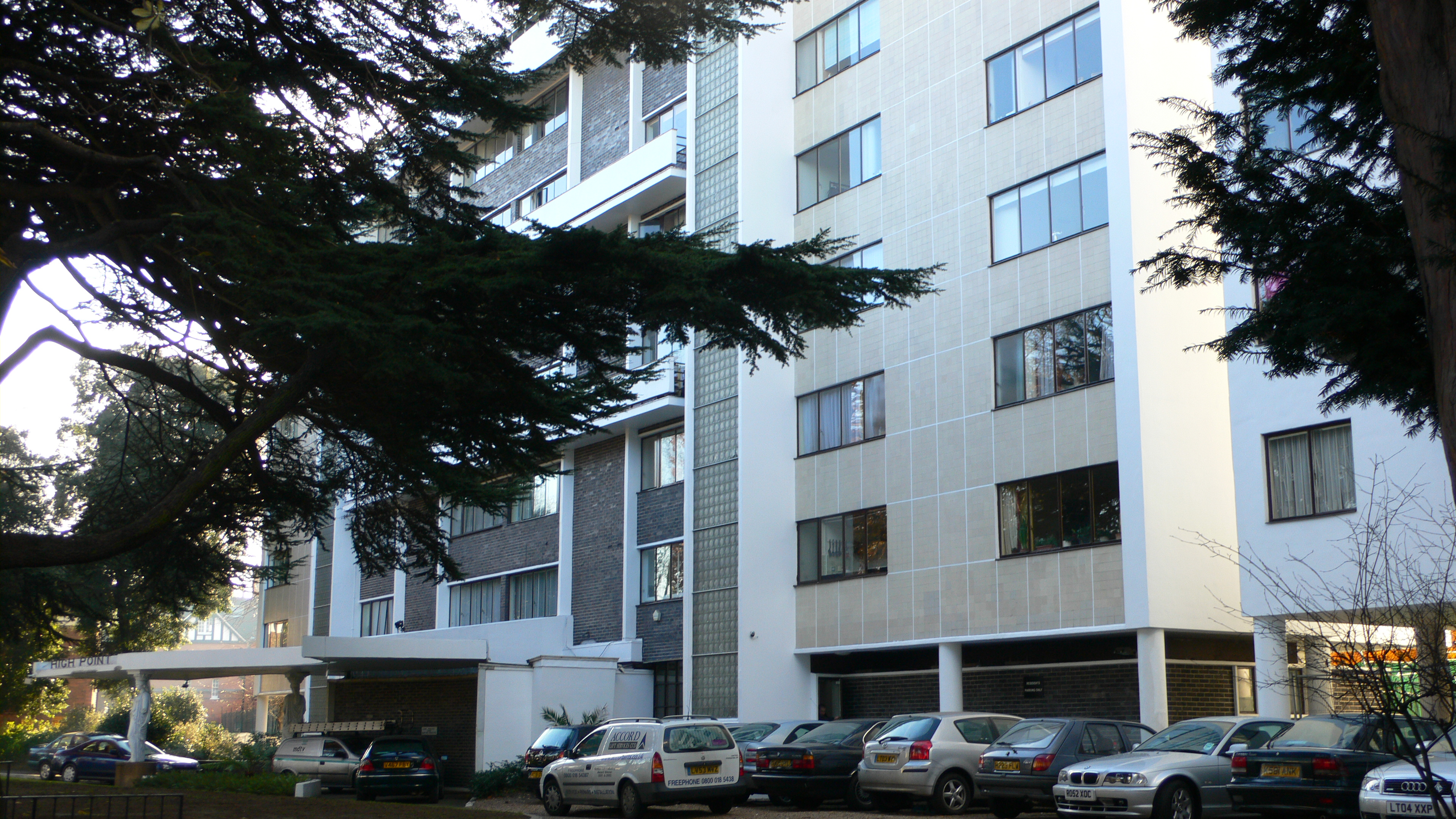
- The Highpoint II apartment building designed by the group

Practice information
- Key architects: Berthold Lubetkin, Francis Skinner, Denys Lasdun, Godfrey Samuel, Lindsay Drake
- Founded: 1932
- Dissolved: 1939

Significant works and honors
- Buildings: Highpoint Towers, Finsbury Health Centre

The Tecton Group was a radical architectural group co-founded by Berthold Lubetkin, Francis Skinner, Denys Lasdun, Michael Dugdale, Anthony Chitty, Val Harding, Godfrey Samuel, and Lindsay Drake in 1932 and disbanded in 1939. The group was one of the leaders in bringing continental modernism to Britain.

Tecton is short for architecton, from the Greek ἀρχιτέκτων 'master builder, architect'.

== History ==
The group's first commission was the 1932-1934 Gorilla House in the London Zoo in Regent's Park. After the successful completion of the Gorilla House, the group designed a penguin pool for the zoo, which contained a unique double helix-shaped walkway without intermediate supports for the penguins and a large swimming area. The group's successes at the London Zoo resulted in their designing two other zoos: Whipsnade Zoo in Bedfordshire and Dudley Zoo in West Midlands. The group then designed the Highpoint I tower, an apartment complex in Highgate. The complex set a new standard for luxury in city life, even though it was originally intended for working-class residents. The group later designed the Highpoint II tower on an adjacent piece of land, which was even more luxurious than its predecessor. After completing Highpoint I, Tecton received a commission for the Finsbury Health Centre. This was the first public commission granted to a modernist architecture group. The building was created with the intention of improving public health through its construction, by creating a positive atmosphere and encouraging patrons to enjoy the outdoors through murals. The Borough of Finsbury was impressed with the Health Centre and commissioned Tecton to work on several housing projects in the borough.

== After Tecton ==
Skinner, Bailey and Lubetkin continued to work together on projects including the Dorset Estate and Sivill House.
