= Grade I listed buildings in England completed in the 20th century =

In England buildings of particular architectural merit and/or historic significance are given statutory protection under the listed buildings scheme. The scheme categorises buildings in three grades: Grade I, the highest grade, Grade II*, and Grade II, the lowest grade. Approximately 500,000 buildings in England have listed building status, the vast majority at Grade II. (Note: 91.7% of all listed buildings are designated Grade II, 5.8% at II* and 2.5% at Grade I.) Decisions on listing are made by the Secretary of State for Culture, Media and Sport, on advice from Historic England, the agency with responsibility for the historic environment. Decisions on listing are closely related to the age of the building. Buildings constructed before 1700 will almost certainly be listed and many constructed between 1700 and 1850 will be. Construction dates between 1850 and 1945 will reduce the likelihood of listing, and even greater selectivity is exercised for post-war buildings. There is a presumption against listing buildings that are less than 30 years old. This approach has seen a relatively small proportion of buildings dating from after 1901 receiving listed status, and even fewer, the highest listing designation, Grade I.

Grade I listed status has been given to 113 buildings completed in the 20th century. (Note: Buildings predating 1900 which have been converted in the 20th/21st centuries, such as the Thematic House in Holland Park, London and the Unicorn Theatre, Abingdon-on-Thames, have not been included in this list.) Of these, there are twenty-four cathedrals, churches and chapels, nineteen war memorials, (Note: Details of all Grade I listed war memorials are given at Grade I listed war memorials in England) seventeen houses, seven memorials, seven university buildings and seven office blocks, four art and museum galleries, three apartment blocks, three military installations and three bridges, two telescopes, two sets of gates, two factories, two animal enclosures and a range of other structures including an orangery, a clinic and a concert hall. Of architects whose work has been listed, the most prolific is Edwin Lutyens, with twenty-one structures to his own account, and two more in partnership, the gardens at Hestercombe House with Gertrude Jekyll, and Middleton Park with his son. Lutyens is followed by Arne Jacobsen, with six buildings at St Catherine's College, Oxford including England's only Grade I listed bike shed. The Modernist Berthold Lubetkin has five buildings on the list, two in conjunction with Ove Arup, who is individually represented by his Kingsgate Bridge in Durham. (Note: Kingsgate Bridge, completed in 1963, was Arup's last design and he considered it his finest.) The Scott architectural dynasty is represented through four ecclesiastical buildings, St John the Baptist Cathedral, Norwich by George Gilbert Scott Jr. and John Oldrid Scott, and three by Giles Gilbert Scott. Robert Lorimer has three war memorials, while Aston Webb also has three structures, all sited at either end of The Mall in central London. Robert Atkinson, William Bidlake, George Frederick Bodley, Ninian Comper, Charles Holden, Goscombe John, Temple Moore, Basil Spence, Owen Williams and Edgar Wood have two buildings each. The engineer Charles Husband designed the two listed telescopes at Jodrell Bank Observatory, the first in partnership with Bernard Lovell. The architects of the two listed military workshops at RAE Farnborough are unknown, while Bob Creer of the Air Ministry is credited with the Operations Room at RAF Uxbridge.

The most recent building to be designated Grade I is Colin St John Wilson's British Library, constructed between 1982 and 1999. The newest designations are for the Sainsbury Wing at the National Gallery, the only work in Britain by Robert Venturi and Denise Scott Brown, which was listed in May 2018; and The New House at Wadhurst Park in Sussex, a private house by John Outram for members of the Rausing family, which was listed in July 2020. Between 2014 and 2018, the First World War Memorials Programme, run by Historic England in commemoration of the centenary of the First World War, saw an increase in the number of Grade I listed structures, with the listing of some 2,500 additional war memorials, and the upgrading of a number of previously listed memorials to the highest, Grade I, designation. There are, as of December 2023, no buildings completed in the 21st century which have been awarded Grade I listed status.

== Listing ==
A listed building is a structure of particular architectural and/or historic interest deserving of special protection. Such buildings are placed on a statutory list maintained by the historic environment agency, Historic England. Buildings are categorised under one of three grades, in descending order of importance:

- Grade I: buildings of exceptional interest.
- Grade II*: particularly important buildings of more than special interest.
- Grade II: buildings that are of special interest.

Listings are formally decided by the Secretary of State for Culture, Media and Sport, on the advice of Historic England, on the basis of a building's architectural and/or historic merit. The specific criteria for listing include:

- Age and rarity: The older a building is, the more likely it is to be listed. All buildings erected before 1700 that "contain a significant proportion of their original fabric" will be listed. Most buildings built between 1700 and 1840 are listed. After 1840 more selection is exercised and "particularly careful selection" is applied after 1945. Buildings less than 30 years old are rarely listed unless they are of outstanding quality and under threat.
- Aesthetic merits: i.e. the appearance of a building. However, buildings that have little visual appeal may be listed on grounds of representing particular aspects of social or economic history.
- Selectivity: where a large number of buildings of a similar type survive, the policy is only to list the most representative or significant examples.
- National interest: significant or distinctive regional buildings; e.g. those that represent a nationally important but localised industry.

As a consequence of the first criterion, buildings constructed after 1901 comprise a small proportion of the total number of listed buildings. Of those that are listed, even fewer are given the highest, Grade I, designation.

== Grade I listed buildings completed in the 20th century ==
Grade I listed buildings in England completed in the 20th century
Name	Location	Type	Architect	Completed (Note: The date given is the date used by Historic England as significant for the initial building or that of an important part in the structure's description.)	Date designated	Grid ref. (Note: The grid reference is based on the British national grid reference system, sometimes known as OSGB36, used by the Ordnance Survey.) Geo-coordinates	Entry number (Note: The "List Entry Number" is a unique number assigned to each listed building and scheduled monument by Historic England.)	Image	Ref.
55 Broadway	Broadway, City of Westminster, London	Commercial offices	Charles Holden	1927–1929	9 January 1970	TQ2960079486; 51°29′58″N 0°08′03″W	1219790	55 Broadway More images	
Admiralty Arch	Charing Cross, City of Westminster, London	Offices	Aston Webb	1906–1911	5 February 1970	TQ2997080305; 51°30′24″N 0°07′43″W	1238982	Admiralty Arch More images	
Ampleforth Abbey Church	Ampleforth, North Yorkshire	Church	Giles Gilbert Scott	1922–1961	9 September 1985	SE5970078855; 54°12′06″N 1°05′05″W	1315767	Ampleforth Abbey Church More images	
Arch of Remembrance	Victoria Park, Leicester	War memorial	Edwin Lutyens	1925	23 February 1955	SK5956503212; 52°37′24″N 1°07′17″W	1074786	Arch of Remembrance More images	
Ashton Memorial	Lancaster, Lancashire	Memorial	John Belcher	1907–1909	22 December 1953	SD4889561319; 54°02′43″N 2°46′55″W	1288429	Ashton Memorial More images	
Barber Institute of Fine Arts	Birmingham, West Midlands	Gallery	Robert Atkinson	1935–1939	19 March 1981	SP0491183650; 52°27′02″N 1°55′40″W	1216784	Barber Institute of Fine Arts More images	
Bedales Memorial Library, Lupton Hall and Corridor	Bedales School, Steep, Hampshire	Library	Ernest Gimson	1922	16 March 1954	SU7428925132; 51°01′15″N 0°56′32″W	1278033	Bedales Memorial Library, Lupton Hall and Corridor More images	
Bristol Central Library	Bristol	Library	Charles Holden	1906	1 November 1966	ST5825272674; 51°27′05″N 2°36′08″W	1202131	Bristol Central Library More images	
British Library	Somers Town, Camden, London	Library	Colin St John Wilson	1982–1999	31 July 2015	TQ2997082897; 51°31′48″N 0°07′40″W	1426345	British Library More images	
Buckingham Palace forecourt gates	Buckingham Palace, City of Westminster, London	Gates	Aston Webb	1901–1911	5 February 1970	TQ2910579705; 51°30′06″N 0°08′29″W	1239251	Buckingham Palace forecourt gates	
Castle Drogo	Drewsteignton, Devon	Country house	Edwin Lutyens	1911–1930	20 February 1952	SX7218490038; 50°41′45″N 3°48′40″W	1106086	Castle Drogo More images	
Cathedral of St John the Baptist	Norwich, Norfolk	Cathedral	George Gilbert Scott Jr. & John Oldrid Scott	1882–1910	26 February 1954	TG2233508547; 52°37′45″N 1°17′02″E	1051299	Cathedral of St John the Baptist More images	
Chatham Naval Memorial	Chatham, Kent	War memorial	Robert Lorimer	1924	5 December 1996	TQ7618668049; 51°23′01″N 0°31′56″E	1267787	Chatham Naval Memorial More images	
Church of All Hallows	Twickenham, Richmond, London	Church	Robert Atkinson	1940	2 September 1952	TQ1586774115; 51°27′15″N 0°20′02″W	1080836	Church of All Hallows More images	
Church of All Saints	Brockhampton, Herefordshire	Church	William Lethaby	1901–1902	25 February 1966	SO5941332147; 51°59′11″N 2°35′33″W	1349021	Church of All Saints More images	
Church of All Saints	Thorney Hill, Sopley, Hampshire	Church	Detmar Blow	1906	24 September 1985	SZ1970099724; 50°47′48″N 1°43′19″W	1302198	Church of All Saints More images	
Church of All Saints	Uplands, Stroud, Gloucestershire	Church	Temple Moore	1907–1910	25 June 1974	SO8562905689; 51°44′59″N 2°12′34″W	1340939	Church of All Saints More images	
Church of St Andrew	Handsworth, Birmingham	Church	William Bidlake	1907–1908	8 July 1982	SP0432190731; 52°30′51″N 1°56′11″W	1076219	Church of St Andrew More images	
Church of St Andrew	Roker, Sunderland, Tyne and Wear	Church	Edward Schroeder Prior	1906–1907	8 May 1950	NZ4040759380; 54°55′39″N 1°22′16″W	1207113	Church of St Andrew More images	
Church of St Chad	Burton upon Trent, Staffordshire	Church	George Frederick Bodley	1903	22 June 1979	SK2461424458; 52°49′02″N 1°38′10″W	1038702	Church of St Chad More images	
Church of St Jude	Hampstead Garden Suburb, Barnet, London	Church	Edwin Lutyens	1908–1910	18 March 1965	TQ2551688361; 51°34′49″N 0°11′24″W	1294714	Church of St Jude More images	
Church of St Mary in the Baum	Rochdale, Greater Manchester	Church	Ninian Comper	1911	3 December 1975	SD813965; 53°49′01″N 2°09′31″W	1025294	Church of St Mary in the Baum More images	
Church of St Mary the Virgin	Wellingborough, Northamptonshire	Church	Ninian Comper	1908–1930	9 June 1970	SP9013068043; 52°18′11″N 0°40′47″W	1371787	Church of St Mary the Virgin More images	
Church of St Monica	Bootle, Sefton, Merseyside	Church	Francis Xavier Velarde	1936	19 March 1981	SJ3503495685; 53°27′14″N 2°58′47″W	1283647	Church of St Monica More images	
Church of St Peter	Shaldon, Teignbridge, Devon	Church	Edmund Harold Sedding & W. D. Caröe	1893–1932	30 June 1949	SX9315272451; 50°32′31″N 3°30′33″W	1269235	Church of St Peter More images	
Church of St Wilfrid	Harrogate, North Yorkshire	Church	Temple Moore	1909–1914	4 February 1975	SE2941255554; 53°59′43″N 1°33′10″W	1189773	Church of St Wilfrid More images	
Church of the Epiphany	Gipton, Leeds, West Yorkshire	Church	Nugent Cachemaille-Day	1936–1938	25 June 1993	SE3356435305; 53°48′47″N 1°29′30″W	1255904	Church of the Epiphany More images	
Coventry Cathedral	Coventry, West Midlands	Cathedral	Basil Spence	1951–1962	29 March 1988	SP3362779065; 52°24′31″N 1°30′26″W	1342941	Coventry Cathedral More images	
D6 Building at Boots Factory Site	Nottingham	Pharmaceutical works	Owen Williams	1938	4 April 1991	SK5435736804; 52°55′33″N 1°11′34″W	1247645	D6 Building at Boots Factory Site More images	
D10 Building at Boots Factory Site	Nottingham	Pharmaceutical works	Owen Williams	1932	28 January 1971	52°55′27″N 1°11′32″W	1247927	D10 Building at Boots Factory Site	
De La Warr Pavilion	Bexhill-on-Sea, East Sussex	Gallery	Erich Mendelsohn & Serge Chermayeff	1935–1936	28 January 1971	TQ7411407134; 50°50′15″N 0°28′17″E	1352840	De La Warr Pavilion More images	
Debenham House	Holland Park, Kensington and Chelsea, London	House	Halsey Ricardo	1905–1907	15 April 1969	TQ2442179690; 51°30′09″N 0°12′32″W	1080783	Debenham House More images	
Edgar Wood Centre	Rusholme, Manchester	Church	Edgar Wood	1903	18 December 1963	SJ8572995702; 53°27′28″N 2°12′59″W	1197770	Edgar Wood Centre More images	
Edith Cavell Memorial	St Martin's Place, City of Westminster, London	Memorial	George Frampton	1920	5 February 1970	TQ2995380649; 51°30′34″N 0°07′38″W	1264768	Edith Cavell Memorial More images	
Ednaston Manor	Brailsford, Derbyshire	Country house	Edwin Lutyens	1912–1919	13 September 1967	SK2384642276; 52°58′38″N 1°38′47″W	1109745	Ednaston Manor	
Falmer House	University of Sussex, Brighton and Hove, East Sussex	University campus	Basil Spence	1960–1962	30 August 1993	TQ3459008940; 50°51′52″N 0°05′20″W	1381044	Falmer House More images	
Finsbury Health Centre	Clerkenwell, Islington, London	Clinic	Berthold Lubetkin	1935–1938	29 September 1972	TQ3129482356; 51°31′30″N 0°06′32″W	1297993	Finsbury Health Centre More images	
Free Church	Hampstead Garden Suburb, Barnet, London	Church	Edwin Lutyens	1908–1910	18 March 1965	TQ2544988471; 51°34′52″N 0°11′27″W	1078866	Free Church More images	
Gala Bingo Club	Tooting, Wandsworth, London	Bingo hall	Cecil Massey	1931	28 June 1972	TQ2752071310; 51°25′35″N 0°10′02″W	1357668	Gala Bingo Club More images	
Goddards	Dringhouses, York	House	Walter Brierley	1926–1927	24 June 1983	SE5891249721; 53°56′25″N 1°06′15″W	1256461	Goddards More images	
Gorilla House & Chimps Breeding Colony	London Zoo, Regent's Park, City of Westminster, London	Animal enclosure	Berthold Lubetkin and the Tecton Group with Ove Arup	1932–1933	14 September 1970	TQ2809483571; 51°32′11″N 0°09′16″W	1357402	Gorilla House & Chimps Breeding Colony More images	
Group Operations Room	RAF Uxbridge, Hillingdon, London	Military installation	Bob Creer	1938–1939	1 December 2005	TQ0654883514; 51°32′26″N 0°27′54″W	1392556	Group Operations Room	
Guards Memorial	Whitehall, City of Westminster, London	War memorial	H. Chalton Bradshaw	1921–1926	14 January 1970	TQ2980680097; 51°30′16″N 0°07′46″W	1231315	Guards Memorial More images	
Hall of Memory	Birmingham, West Midlands	War memorial	Samuel Nathaniel Cooke Jr.	1925	27 October 2014	52°28′17″N 1°57′22″W	1244943	Hall of Memory More images	
Handsworth Mortuary Chapel	Handsworth, Birmingham	Chapel	William Bidlake	1909–1910	8 July 1982	SP0292491001; 52°30′59″N 1°57′25″W	1076218	Handsworth Mortuary Chapel More images	
Heathcote	Ilkley, West Yorkshire	House	Edwin Lutyens	1906–1908	12 December 2014	SE1085747608; 53°55′28″N 1°50′10″W	1133518	Heathcote More images	
Hestercombe House garden wall and terraces	Cheddon Fitzpaine, Somerset	Terraces	Gertrude Jekyll & Edwin Lutyens	1904–1906	17 May 1985	ST2410528662; 51°03′08″N 3°05′03″W	1060514	Hestercombe House garden wall and terraces	
Hestercombe House Orangery	Cheddon Fitzpaine, Somerset	Orangery	Edwin Lutyens	1904–1909	17 May 1985	ST2420628695; 51°03′09″N 3°04′58″W	1175994	Hestercombe House Orangery More images	
Highpoint I	Highgate, Haringey, London	Apartment block	Berthold Lubetkin	1933–1935	10 May 1974	TQ2825287841; 51°34′29″N 0°09′02″W	1358885	Highpoint I More images	
Highpoint II	Highgate, Haringey, London	Apartment block	Berthold Lubetkin	1936–1938	10 May 1974	TQ2826987801; 51°34′28″N 0°09′02″W	1079183	Highpoint II More images	
Holy Trinity Church	Knightsbridge, City of Westminster, London	Church	George Frederick Bodley	1901–1907	24 February 1958	TQ2650579467; 51°30′00″N 0°10′44″W	1265499	Holy Trinity Church More images	
Humber Bridge	Hessle, East Riding of Yorkshire	Bridge	Freeman, Fox & Partners	1973–1981	12 July 2017	TA0241224487; 53°42′24″N 0°27′00″W	1447321	Humber Bridge More images	
Impington Village College	Impington, Cambridgeshire	School	Walter Gropius & Maxwell Fry	1938–1939	28 January 1971	TL4462263170; 52°14′52″N 0°07′01″E	1331296	Impington Village College More images	
Isokon building	Hampstead, Barnet, London	Apartment block	Wells Coates	1933–1934	14 May 1974	TQ2751985275; 51°33′07″N 0°09′44″W	1379280	Isokon building More images	
Johnston Monument	St Mary's Church, Gilston, Hertfordshire	Memorial	Eric Gill	1923	19 September 1984	TL4395213512; 51°48′06″N 0°05′11″E	1101277	Upload Photo	
King Edward VII Galleries	The British Museum, Bloomsbury, City of Westminster, London	Gallery	John James Burnet & Thomas S. Tait	1905–1914	24 October 1951	TQ2999181801; 51°31′13″N 0°07′40″W	1322129	King Edward VII Galleries More images	
Kingsgate Bridge	Durham, County Durham	Bridge	Ove Arup	1963	29 May 1998	NZ2759342106; 54°46′23″N 1°34′21″W	1119766	Kingsgate Bridge More images	
Little Thakeham	Thakeham, Horsham, West Sussex	Country house	Edwin Lutyens	1903	15 March 1955	TQ1090315728; 50°55′49″N 0°25′24″W	1027209	Little Thakeham More images	
Liverpool Cathedral	Liverpool, Merseyside	Cathedral	Giles Gilbert Scott	1904–1978	28 June 1952	SJ3530689433; 53°23′51″N 2°58′23″W	1361681	Liverpool Cathedral More images	
Liverpool Cenotaph	Liverpool, Merseyside	War memorial	Lionel Bailey Budden	1927–1930	20 November 1975	SJ3489490663; 53°24′31″N 2°58′46″W	1064002	Liverpool Cenotaph More images	
Lloyd's Building	Lime Street, City of London	Commercial offices	Richard Rogers	1978–1986	19 December 2011	TQ3315981082; 51°30′47″N 0°04′57″W	1405493	Lloyd's Building More images	
Lovell Telescope	Jodrell Bank Observatory, Goostrey, Cheshire	Telescope	Bernard Lovell & Charles Husband	1952–1957	13 July 1988	SJ7950071099; 53°14′10″N 2°18′26″W	1221685	Lovell Telescope More images	
Mark II (radio telescope)	Jodrell Bank Observatory, Goostrey, Cheshire	Telescope	Charles Husband	1964	10 July 2017	SJ7981570810; 53°14′02″N 2°18′14″W	1443087	Mark II (radio telescope) More images	
Marshcourt	Marsh Court, King's Somborne, Hampshire	Country house	Edwin Lutyens	1901–1905	29 May 1957	SU3566033594; 51°06′02″N 1°29′32″W	1093803	Marshcourt More images	
Mercantile Marine First World War Memorial	Tower Hill, Tower Hamlets, London	War memorial	Edwin Lutyens	1928	27 September 1973	TQ3350180710; 51°30′35″N 0°04′41″W	1260087	Mercantile Marine First World War Memorial	
Middleton Park	Middleton Stoney, Oxfordshire	Country house	Edwin Lutyens & Robert Lutyens	1938	26 November 1951	SP5249223237; 51°54′19″N 1°14′18″W	1232948	Middleton Park More images	
Midland Bank	Poultry, City of London	Commercial offices	Edwin Lutyens	1924	5 June 1972	TQ3262281144; 51°30′49″N 0°05′25″W	1064598	Midland Bank More images	
New House	Wadhurst Park, Wadhurst, East Sussex	Country house	John Outram	1982–1986	2 July 2020	TQ6323328810; 51°02′08″N 0°19′36″E	1457638	Upload Photo	
New Place	Shedfield, Winchester	Country house	Edwin Lutyens	1906	3 February 1952	SU5665813537; 50°55′07″N 1°11′43″W	1095660	New Place More images	
Northampton War Memorial	Northampton, Northamptonshire	War memorial	Edwin Lutyens	1926	28 October 2015	SP7549660465; 52°14′14″N 0°53′45″W	1191327	Northampton War Memorial More images	
Northumberland Fusiliers Memorial	Newcastle upon Tyne, Tyne and Wear	War memorial	Goscombe John	1923	17 December 1971	NZ2488464954; 54°58′43″N 1°36′46″W	1186201	Northumberland Fusiliers Memorial More images	
Penguin Pool	London Zoo, Regent's Park, City of Westminster, London	Animal enclosure	Berthold Lubetkin and the Tecton Group with Ove Arup	1934	14 September 1970	TQ2817383293; 51°32′02″N 0°09′12″W	1225665	Penguin Pool More images	
Plymouth Naval Memorial	Plymouth, Devon	War memorial	Robert Lorimer	1924	1 May 1975	SX4774053940; 50°21′56″N 4°08′32″W	1386464	Plymouth Naval Memorial More images	
Port Sunlight War Memorial	Port Sunlight, Wirral, Merseyside	War memorial	Goscombe John	1921	20 December 1965	SJ3358484509; 53°21′11″N 2°59′53″W	1343491	Port Sunlight War Memorial More images	
Portsmouth Naval Memorial	Southsea, Portsmouth, Hampshire	War memorial	Robert Lorimer	1924	23 May 2016	SZ6385298495; 50°46′57″N 1°05′44″W	1386975	Portsmouth Naval Memorial More images	
Preston Cenotaph	Preston, Lancashire	War memorial	Giles Gilbert Scott	1926	20 December 1991	SD5389529482; 53°45′34″N 2°41′58″W	1218458	Preston Cenotaph More images	
Q121 Building at former Royal Aircraft Establishment site	Farnborough, Hampshire	Military installation		1934–1935	4 December 1996	SU8678754709; 51°17′06″N 0°45′25″W	1259589	Q121 Building at former Royal Aircraft Establishment site More images	
Queen Alexandra Memorial	St James's, City of Westminster, London	Memorial	Alfred Gilbert	1926–1932	5 February 1970	TQ2941480061; 51°30′17″N 0°08′12″W	1239703	Queen Alexandra Memorial More images	
Queen Victoria Memorial	The Mall, City of Westminster, London	Memorial	Thomas Brock	1901–1911	5 February 1970	TQ2915479739; 51°30′07″N 0°08′26″W	1273864	Queen Victoria Memorial More images	
Queen Victoria Memorial gates and gatepiers, balustrades, steps and retaining wall with fountain	The Mall, City of Westminster, London	Gates	Aston Webb	1901–1911	5 February 1970	TQ2911279822; 51°30′09″N 0°08′28″W	1239086	Queen Victoria Memorial gates and gatepiers, balustrades, steps and retaining wall with fountain More images	
R133 Building at former Royal Aircraft Establishment site	Farnborough, Hampshire	Military installation		1939–1942	4 December 1996	SU8686154824; 51°17′09″N 0°45′21″W	1259586	R133 Building at former Royal Aircraft Establishment site More images	
Rochdale Cenotaph	Rochdale, Greater Manchester	War memorial	Edwin Lutyens	1922	12 February 1985	SD8953013314	1084274	Rochdale Cenotaph More images	
Rodmarton Manor	Rodmarton, Gloucestershire	Country house	Ernest Barnsley	1909–1929	4 June 1952	ST943977; 51°40′41″N 2°05′01″W	1341402	Rodmarton Manor More images	
Royal Artillery Memorial	Hyde Park Corner, City of Westminster, London	War memorial	Charles Sargeant Jagger and Lionel Pearson	1925	14 January 1970	TQ2836579801; 51°30′09″N 0°09′07″W	1231613	Royal Artillery Memorial More images	
Royal College of Physicians, 11 St Andrew's Place	St Andrew's Place, Regent's Park, City of Westminster, London	Headquarters building	Denys Lasdun	1960–1964	24 April 1998	TQ2878382390; 51°31′33″N 0°08′42″W	1246159	Royal College of Physicians, 11 St Andrew's Place	
Royal Festival Hall	South Bank, Lambeth, London	Concert hall	Leslie Martin	1963–1964	29 March 1988	TQ3079780223; 51°30′21″N 0°07′00″W	1249756	Royal Festival Hall More images	
Royal Liver Building	Liverpool, Merseyside	Commercial offices	Walter Aubrey Thomas	1908–1910	12 July 1966	SJ3379390355; 53°24′20″N 2°59′46″W	1356370	Royal Liver Building More images	
Royd House	Hale, Cheshire	House	Edgar Wood	1916	13 October 1975	SJ7834886681; 53°22′36″N 2°19′37″W	1067922	Royd House	
Sainsbury Wing at the National Gallery	Trafalgar Square, City of Westminster, London	Gallery	Robert Venturi & Denise Scott Brown	1988–1991	9 May 2018	TQ2988580510; 51°30′31″N 0°07′47″W	1451082	Sainsbury Wing at the National Gallery More images	
Sandham Memorial Chapel	Burghclere, Hampshire	Chapel	Lionel Godfrey Pearson	1926	18 May 1984	SU4632960830; 51°20′41″N 1°20′10″W	1339741	Sandham Memorial Chapel More images	
Severn Bridge	Aust, Tidenham, Gloucestershire	Bridge	Percy Thomas	1961–1966	26 November 1999	ST5576190317; 51°36′36″N 2°38′25″W	1119760	Severn Bridge More images	
Southampton Cenotaph	Southampton, Hampshire	War memorial	Edwin Lutyens	1920	8 October 1981	SU4191612408; 50°54′35″N 1°24′19″W	1340007	Southampton Cenotaph More images	
Spalding War Memorial	Spalding, Lincolnshire	War memorial	Edwin Lutyens	1922	20 November 1975	TF2491722256; 52°47′03″N 0°09′01″W	1064002	Spalding War Memorial More images	
St Catherine's College Bicycle Store	St Catherine's College, Oxford, Oxfordshire	Bicycle store	Arne Jacobsen	1961–1966	30 March 1993	SP5217406729; 51°45′25″N 1°14′44″W	1229973	St Catherine's College Bicycle Store More images	
St Catherine's College Brick retaining wall	St Catherine's College, Oxford, Oxfordshire	Wall	Arne Jacobsen	1961–1966	30 March 1993	SP5220306589; 51°45′20″N 1°14′42″W	1047051	St Catherine's College Brick retaining wall	
St Catherine's College Gymnasium	St Catherine's College, Oxford, Oxfordshire	Gymnasium	Arne Jacobsen	1961–1966	30 March 1993	SP5230406505; 51°45′17″N 1°14′37″W	1369495	St Catherine's College Gymnasium	
St Catherine's College Masters House and attached wall	St Catherine's College, Oxford, Oxfordshire	House	Arne Jacobsen	1961–1966	30 March 1993	SP5219506696; 51°45′24″N 1°14′43″W	1278800	St Catherine's College Masters House and attached wall	
St Catherine's College Music House	St Catherine's College, Oxford, Oxfordshire	Concert hall	Arne Jacobsen	1961–1966	30 March 1993	SP5219606568; 51°45′19″N 1°14′43″W	1047052	St Catherine's College Music House	
St Catherine's College Podium and all buildings on it	St Catherine's College, Oxford, Oxfordshire	University campus	Arne Jacobsen	1961–1966	30 March 1993	SP5225806640; 51°45′22″N 1°14′40″W	1229934	St Catherine's College Podium and all buildings on it	
Statue of Captain Albert Ball	Nottingham Castle, Nottingham	Memorial	Henry Poole	1921	12 July 1972	SK5695139510; 52°57′00″N 1°09′14″W	1246929	Statue of Captain Albert Ball More images	
Surrey House (formerly Norwich Union Head Office)	Norwich, Norfolk	Commercial offices	George Skipper	1903–1904	5 June 1972	TG2304808147; 52°37′31″N 1°17′39″E	1210553	Surrey House (formerly Norwich Union Head Office) More images	
The Burghers of Calais	Victoria Tower Gardens, City of Westminster, London	Statuary group	Auguste Rodin	1915	5 February 1970	TQ3026379286; 51°29′51″N 0°07′29″W	1066150	The Burghers of Calais More images	
The Cenotaph	Whitehall, City of Westminster, London	War memorial	Edwin Lutyens	1919–1920	5 February 1970	TQ3015979858; 51°30′10″N 0°07′34″W	1357354	The Cenotaph More images	
The Deanery	Sonning, Berkshire	Country house	Edwin Lutyens	1901	1 August 1952	SU7570575617; 51°28′28″N 0°54′41″W	1319459	The Deanery More images	
The Hoo	Willingdon and Jevington, Wealden District, East Sussex	Country house	Edwin Lutyens	1902	10 December 1973	TQ5889002406; 50°47′58″N 0°15′12″E	1184911	The Hoo More images	
The Salutation	Sandwich, Kent	House	Edwin Lutyens	1912	19 May 1950	TR3336658124; 51°16′28″N 1°20′40″E	1069643	The Salutation More images	
Tigbourne Court	Wormley & Hambledon, Surrey	Country house	Edwin Lutyens	1899–1901	9 March 1960	SU9567537910; 51°07′57″N 0°38′02″W	1240229	Tigbourne Court More images	
Tomb of Karl Marx	Highgate Cemetery, Highgate, Camden, London	Memorial	Laurence Bradshaw	1956	14 May 1974	TQ2874486891; 51°33′58″N 0°08′38″W	1378872	Tomb of Karl Marx More images	
Wagoners' Memorial	Sledmere, East Riding of Yorkshire	War memorial	Mark Sykes	1919–1920	18 March 2016	SE9289864690; 54°04′11″N 0°34′55″W	1161354	Wagoners' Memorial More images	
Westminster Cathedral	Francis Street, City of Westminster, London	Cathedral	John Francis Bentley	1895–1903	1 December 1987	TQ2924879074; 51°29′45″N 0°08′22″W	1066500	Westminster Cathedral More images	
Willis Building	Ipswich, Suffolk	Commercial offices	Norman Foster	1975	25 April 1991	52°03′22″N 1°09′05″E	1237417	Willis Building More images	
Winchester College War Cloister	Winchester, Hampshire	War memorial	Herbert Baker	1924	24 March 1950	SU4811928905; 51°03′27″N 1°18′53″W	1095486	Winchester College War Cloister More images	

== See also ==
- Listed building
- Listed buildings in England
- Grade I listed war memorials in England
