= Sedding =

Sedding is a surname. Notable people with the surname include:

- Edmund Sedding (1836–1868), English architect and musician
- Edmund Harold Sedding (1863–1921), English architect
