= Church of St Peter, Shaldon =

Church in Devon, England

St Peter’s Church, Shaldon
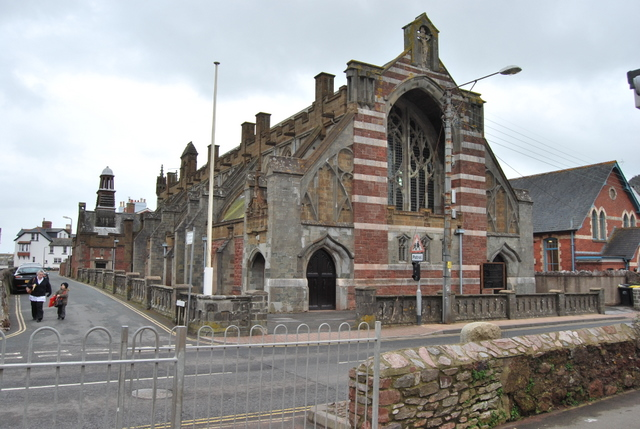
- "A superlative example of Arts and Crafts inventiveness”
- St Peter’s Church, Shaldon
- 50.542°N 3.71885°W
- OS grid reference: SX 93152 72451
- Country: England
- Denomination: Church of England
- Website: www.haldonteam.org.uk

History
- Status: Active
- Consecrated: 29 July 1902

Architecture
- Heritage designation: Grade I listed building
- Architect: Edmund Harold Sedding
- Architectural type: Arts & Crafts
- Years built: 1893-1902
- Groundbreaking: 21 July 1893
- Construction cost: £10,000 (equivalent to £1,060,000 in 2025)

Specifications
- Length: 128 feet (39 m)
- Width: 45 feet (14 m)

Administration
- Diocese: Diocese of Exeter
- Archdeaconry: Archdeaconry of Totnes
- Deanery: Kenn
- Benefice: Teignmouth, Ideford with Luton, Ashcombe, Bishopsteignton and Shaldon
- Parish: Shaldon

The Church of St Peter is the Church of England parish church of the village of Shaldon, Devon. Designed by Edmund Harold Sedding, and with later additions by William Douglas Caröe, it is a Grade I listed building.

== History ==
The original parish church for the parish of Shaldon was St Nicholas, Ringmore, a small chapel of ease to the west of the village. In the very late 19th century, and in response to the increasing population of Shaldon, the ecclesiastical authorities determined to build a new church on the foreshore in the centre of the village. Their chosen architect was Edmund Harold Sedding, son of the notable West Country church architect, Edmund Sedding, and himself a prolific restorer of churches throughout Devon and Cornwall. St Peter's is one of the few, completely new, church buildings Sedding designed.

The church was constructed between 1893 and 1902. It was consecrated by the Bishop of Exeter, Rt. Revd. Herbert Edward Ryle on 29 July 1902.

A description of the church at its opening was given in the Exeter and Plymouth Gazette of 30 July 1902.

The ceilings of the nave and chancel were built in cradle form, with panels of blue stone divided by broad ribs. The crown of the vault is 38 feet (12 m) from the floor. At the east end of the aisle is the lady chapel, separated from the nave by lofty arches. The chancel and lady chapel are apsidal. The north aisle terminates with the vestries and organ chamber. The flooring of the chancel and lady chapel uses various marbles from Devon, Italy and Africa. The rails to both altars are of alabaster. The chancel is separated from the nave by a large stone traceried screen. On the cornice are five figures in Penkridge stone, the central one being St Peter standing at the foot of the cross, the figure of Christ being in bronze. The other figures represent St Paul, St Nicholas, St Mary and St John. Five feed above the cornice of the screen a band of wrought ironwork stretches across the church, the design being of a running vine pattern, with gilded crowns at intervals over each stone figure. The summit of the Cross is 30 feet (9.1 m) above the floor. The large west window rests on a bold arch spanning the nave about 10 feet (3.0 m) above the floor. The 8 feet (2.4 m) recess from this arch to the west wall forms the baptistry. Externally the west window is seen recessed as the nave roof is carried beyond the line of the window, and is supported by an open arch resting on two piers six feet wide, which rest on the low west wall. At the sides of the arch are flying buttresses with open tracery. The tracery of the west windows is a feature of the church. Six flying buttresses on each side of the building help to support the thrust of the nave ceiling. There is a large niche or pinnacle over each buttress resting on the clerestory walls. The roofs are covered with Welsh slates. The four massive buttresses at the east end are surmounted by effective pinnacle work. The various kinds of stone used in the building are the local red rock, Bath, Portland, Polyphant, Bath and Beer. The church has cost £10,000. The builder is Mr. Nicholls of Polyphant. The sculpture was executed by Mr. Hitch of Vauxhall and the whole work designed and superintended by Mr. Edmund Sedding, F.R.I.B.A. of Plymouth.

In 1932 W. D. Caroe was engaged to add buttresses to the exterior of the building.

Regular services are held.

== Architecture and description ==
Nikolaus Pevsner described St Peter's as "a superlative example of Arts & Crafts inventiveness". The church is listed at Grade I as a building of exceptional interest. It is notable for its organ.

== Incumbents ==
- Richard M. Marsh Dunn 1903
- Robert Fernsby 1922
- Wilfred Arthur E. Westall 1945
- Leonard Alfred E. Horsfield 1951
- Charles Daniel Wood 1963
- Samuel Philpott 1976
- Harvey Royden Phillips 1979
- Ashley Manhire 1983
- Geoffrey S. Richardson 2001
- Annie Church 2014

== Sources ==
- Parker, Richard (2018). Archaeological Watching Brief and Documentary Research at St Nicholas' Church, Ringmore, Shaldon, Devon (PDF). Shaldon: St Nicholas' Church PCC.
- Pevsner, Nikolaus; Cherry, Bridget (1989). Devon. The Buildings of England. Harmondsworth, Middlesex: Penguin Books. ISBN 9780140710502. OCLC 21888248.
- Wilson, Helen (2016). "The Architect Edmund H. Sedding and his Devon Churches". Transactions of the Devonshire Association. 148.
