= Church of St Mary the Virgin, Wellingborough =

Coordinates: 52.3031°N 0.6796°W

Church of St Mary the Virgin
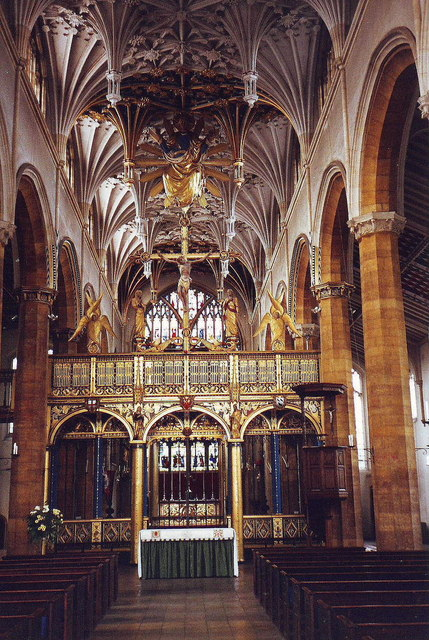
- Interior of St Mary's Church
- Church of St Mary the Virgin
- Location: Knox Road, Wellingborough, Northamptonshire, NN8 1PX
- Country: England
- Denomination: Church of England
- Churchmanship: Anglo-Catholic

History
- Status: Active
- Dedication: St Mary the Virgin

Architecture
- Functional status: Parish church
- Heritage designation: Grade I listed
- Architect: Sir Ninian Comper
- Architectural type: Perpendicular Gothic

Administration
- Diocese: Diocese of Peterborough
- Archdeaconry: Archdeaconry of Northampton
- Deanery: Wellingborough
- Parish: St Mary the Virgin Wellingborough

Clergy
- Bishop: The Rt Revd Luke Irvine-Capel SSC (AEO)
- Vicar: Fr Robert Farmer SSC

The Church of St Mary the Virgin is a Church of England parish church in Wellingborough, Northamptonshire. The church is a Grade I listed building.

== History ==
The church was built from 1908 to 1930, and was designed by Sir Ninian Comper. It is in the Perpendicular Gothic style. The design and interior of the church was influenced by the Oxford Movement and the Victorian revival of ritualism Financing of the work was largely due to the Misses Sharman of Wellingborough.

On 9 June 1970, St Mary's Church was designated a Grade I listed building. It is one of only a few Grade I listed buildings built in the 20th century.

== Present day ==
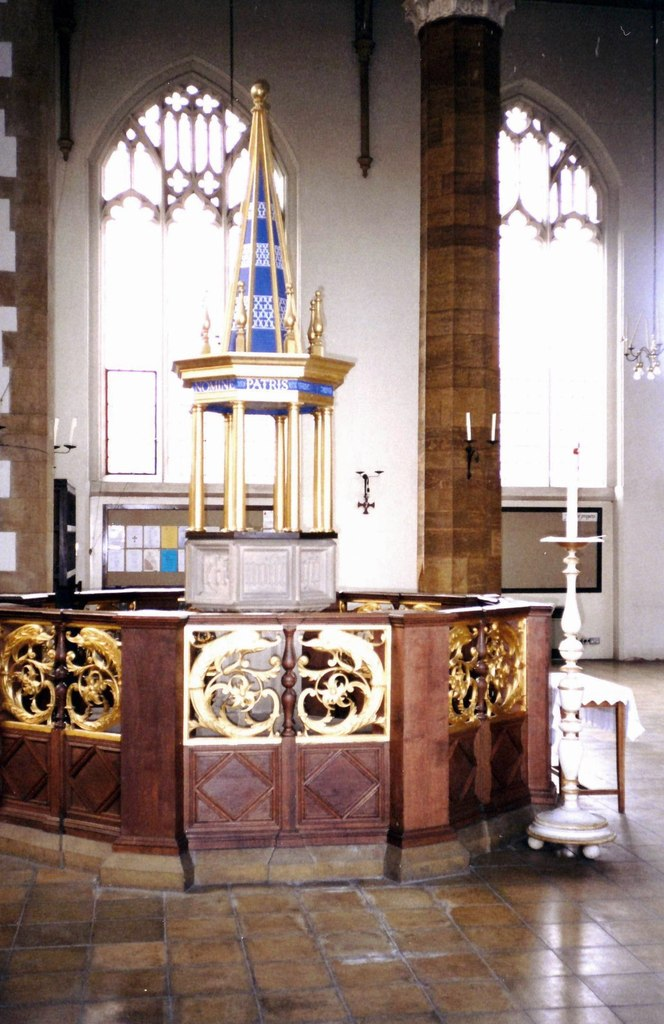
Baptistry

The parish of St Mary the Virgin Wellingborough is in the Archdeaconry of Northampton in the Diocese of Peterborough.

St Mary's stands in the Anglo-Catholic tradition of the Church of England. As the parish has passed a resolution to reject the ordination of women, it receives alternative episcopal oversight from the Bishop of Richborough. It is also affiliated with Forward in Faith and The Society.

== Notable clergy ==
- Michael Bent, later Archdeacon of Taranaki in New Zealand and Dean of Holy Trinity Cathedral, Fiji, served his curacy here from 1955 to 1960.

=== List of vicars ===
- 1905-1928: Fr Thomas Watts
- 1929-1946: Fr Conrad Radford
- 1947-1952: Fr Rowland Taylor
- 1952–1966: Fr Raymond Brown
- 1967–1988: Fr Thomas Finch SSC
- 1990–1994: Fr Alan Robinson (priest in charge) (now Rector of Corpus Christi Catholic Church, Maiden Lane - the Diocesan Shrine of the Blessed Sacrament for the Diocese of Westminster)
- 1996–present: Fr Robert Farmer SSC (priest in charge, 1996–2000)
