= Gorilla House =

Building in London Zoo

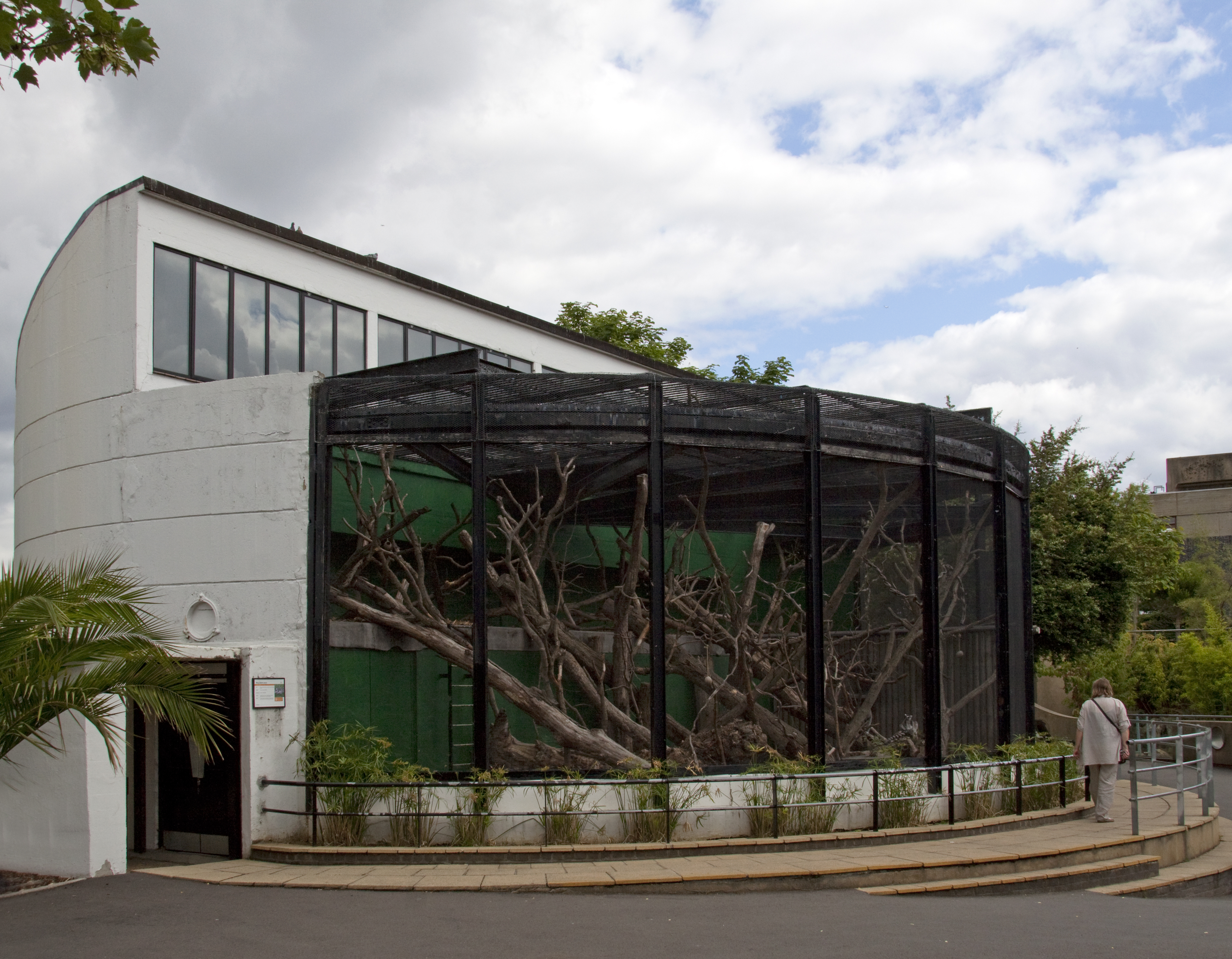
- The Gorilla House in 2010
- Alternative names: Round House

General information
- Architectural style: Modernist architect
- Coordinates: 51°32′11″N 0°09′16″W
- Opened: April 1933

Design and construction
- Architect: Berthold Lubetkin
- Designations

Listed Building – Grade I
- Official name: Chimps Breeding Colony the Gorilla House
- Designated: 14 September 1970
- Reference no.: 101357402

Website
- www.londonzoo.org/zoo-stories/history-of-london-zoo/round-house

The Gorilla House (later known as the "Round House") is a building at London Zoo, on a site between Regent's Canal and the Outer Circle of Regent's Park. Built in 1932–33, it was designed by the Modernist architect Berthold Lubetkin, with civil engineering assistance from Ove Arup, in the International Style. It was the first substantial building completed to a design by Lubetkin's firm, Tecton Group, and the firm's first building at London Zoo. It was designated as a Grade I listed building in 1970.

The Gorilla House was commissioned to house the zoo's pair of gorillas from the Congo, Mok and Moina. The main structure is based on a cylindrical drum made from 4 in (10 cm) reinforced concrete, painted white. The structure is divided into two halves, one enclosed and one open, with a semi-circular indoor winter enclosure to the north, and a low-walled open-air summer enclosure to the south surrounded by a metal cage. The entrance and exit doors are in small projecting wings to the east and west. It included a rotating semi-circular top-hung insulating screen, rotating around a central pivot and moving along rollers in a metal channel around the top of the building, that could be deployed in the winter to turn the outdoor space into a sheltered viewing area for zoo visitors, while the gorilla remained behind glass screens in their heated indoor enclosure. In the summer, the screen could be rotated away and concealed within the northern half of the structure, so the gorillas could live and viewed in the outdoor half of the structure. The northern half is lit by clerestory windows, topped by a flat asphalt roof. It opened in April 1933.

The structure was later housed a series of different animals, including elephants, Kodiak bears, chimpanzees (from which the building is sometimes known as the "Chimps Breeding Colony"), koalas, aye ayes, and fruit bats. The rotating screen fell out of use and was fixed in place.

After the successful Gorilla House, Tecton Group designed other structures at the zoo, including its Penguin Pool, also completed in 1934 and also listed at Grade I in 1970.

== See also ==
- Grade I listed buildings in England completed in the 20th century
- Grade I listed buildings in the City of Westminster
