= St Catherine's College Bicycle Store =

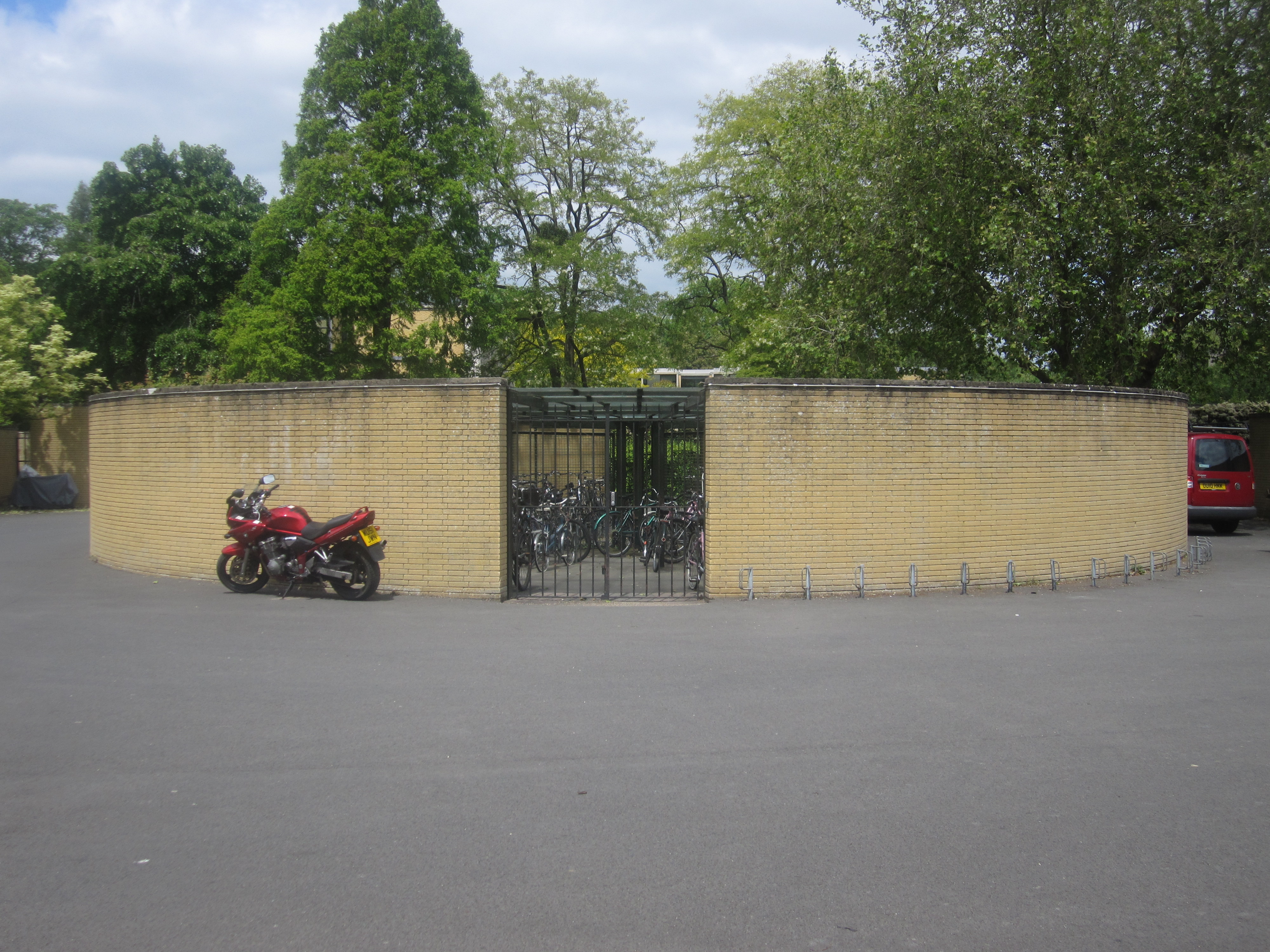
- "a bicycle shed is a building; Lincoln Cathedral is a piece of architecture"
- Interactive map of the St Catherine's College Bicycle Store area

General information
- Type: Shed
- Architectural style: Modernist
- Location: St Catherine's College, Oxford
- Coordinates: 51.7568°N 1.2455°W
- Construction started: 1961; 65 years ago
- Governing body: St Catherine's College

Listed Building – Grade I
- Official name: St Catherine's College Bicycle Store
- Designated: 30 March 1993
- Reference no.: 1229973

Design and construction
- Architect: Arne Jacobsen

St Catherine's College Bicycle Store is located at St Catherine's College in the city of Oxford, in England. Designed by Arne Jacobsen in the 1960s, the structure is a Grade I listed building. One of some fifteen such bike sheds listed by Historic England, it is the only one to hold the highest, Grade I, designation.

== History ==
The predecessor of St Catherine's College, Oxford was instituted in 1868, to enable students from poorer backgrounds to attend the university without taking on the expense of enrolling in a college. St Catherine's gained full college status in 1962 and is now the university's largest. The driving force for the college's development was its first master, the historian Alan Bullock. Plans for the college were begun in the 1950s and the Danish architect Arne Jacobsen was chosen to develop the site on Holywell Great Meadow just to the north of the city centre. (Note: Arne Jacobsen was selected without an architectural competition which, allied to his being foreign and a Modernist, saw some opposition from traditionalist British architects. But he and Alan Bullock worked well together, despite Bullock privately describing him as "difficult". In an interview with The Observer in 1960, at the point at which his plans had just been published, Jacobsen described the college authorities as the "best" clients he had ever worked with, and the project the "most interesting" of his career.) (Note: Bullock and Jacobsen's achievement was celebrated in 2022, the sixtieth anniversary of the college's foundation.) Jacobsen oversaw every aspect of the college's design, and the bicycle shed is an example of his close attention to all elements of student life. (Note: Jacobsen was a polymath who, in addition to his architectural works, designed furniture, textiles and metalwork. Among his most famous non-architectural designs are the Egg and Swan Chairs. At St Catherine’s, his attention to every detail saw him design much of the furniture, lighting and cutlery in a Danish modern style, and choose the particular types and number of the fish which were to inhabit the ornamental pool in the college quadrangle. His obsessive approach led him to propose weaving marker points into his carpet design for the Senior Common Room, to discourage the dons from moving the chairs from their designated positions.) The architectural merit of the college and its grounds was recognised in 1993 when the college campus was designated as a Grade I listed site. (Note: St Catherine's architectural merits were not universally appreciated. John Simopoulos, philosopher and fellow during Bullock's tenure, attacked the lack of sound insulation; "you [couldn't] blow your nose without knocking someone off his chair next door", a feature also commented on by Colin Tweedy, Chief Executive of The Building Centre and a former student at the college, "the Jacobsen-designed beds, very much spartan and single, became very audible when one invited a “guest“ to share the night with you".) Some individual buildings on the site have their own listings, including the bicycle shed, and the college gardens are listed at Grade I on the Register of Historic Parks and Gardens of Special Historic Interest in England.

If building becomes beautiful, then it is architecture. Clearly if a building is not functionally and technically in order; then it isn't architecture, it's only building. It has been said for many years that when a building is practical and functional, it is beautiful as well. That I don't believe, because there are different ways of solving a problem functionally – without ever managing to make it beautiful!

— Interview by Jacobsen, given to the Danish newspaper Politiken a month before his death.

== Description ==
The bicycle shed is circular in design, built in yellow brick laid in a stretcher bond, and roofed. The brick used, here and elsewhere, was the subject of considerable debate. Jacobsen originally insisted on bricks of Danish manufacture, before eventually conceding that one type of English brick, from Uxbridge, would suffice. Even then, he required a non-standard dimension for their manufacture, and imported Danish bricklayers to instruct the English labourers. The store was constructed between 1963 and 1964. (Note: A photograph held in the archive of the Royal Institute of British Architects is dated 1964 and shows the structure as complete.) Its Grade I listing makes it unique among the roughly fifteen such bike sheds which are listed. Historic England, in its discussion of the listings, recalled Nikolaus Pevsner's opening to his An Outline of European Architecture, published in 1943; "a bicycle shed is a building; Lincoln Cathedral is a piece of architecture". (Note: Nikolaus Pevsner, himself a firm Modernist, was highly appreciative of Jacobsen's design, calling St Catherine's, "a perfect piece of architecture".) Pevsner's comment was echoed by Jacobsen in an interview given in the month before his death in 1971 [see box].

== Sources ==
- Pevsner, Nikolaus; Sherwood, Jennifer (1974). Oxfordshire. The Buildings of England. Harmondsworth, England: Penguin Books. ISBN 978-0-140-71045-8. OCLC 925990705.
- Richardson, Tim (2018). Oxford College Gardens. London, UK: White Lion Publishing. ISBN 978-0-711-23978-4.
