= Penguin Pool, London Zoo =

Penguin Pool
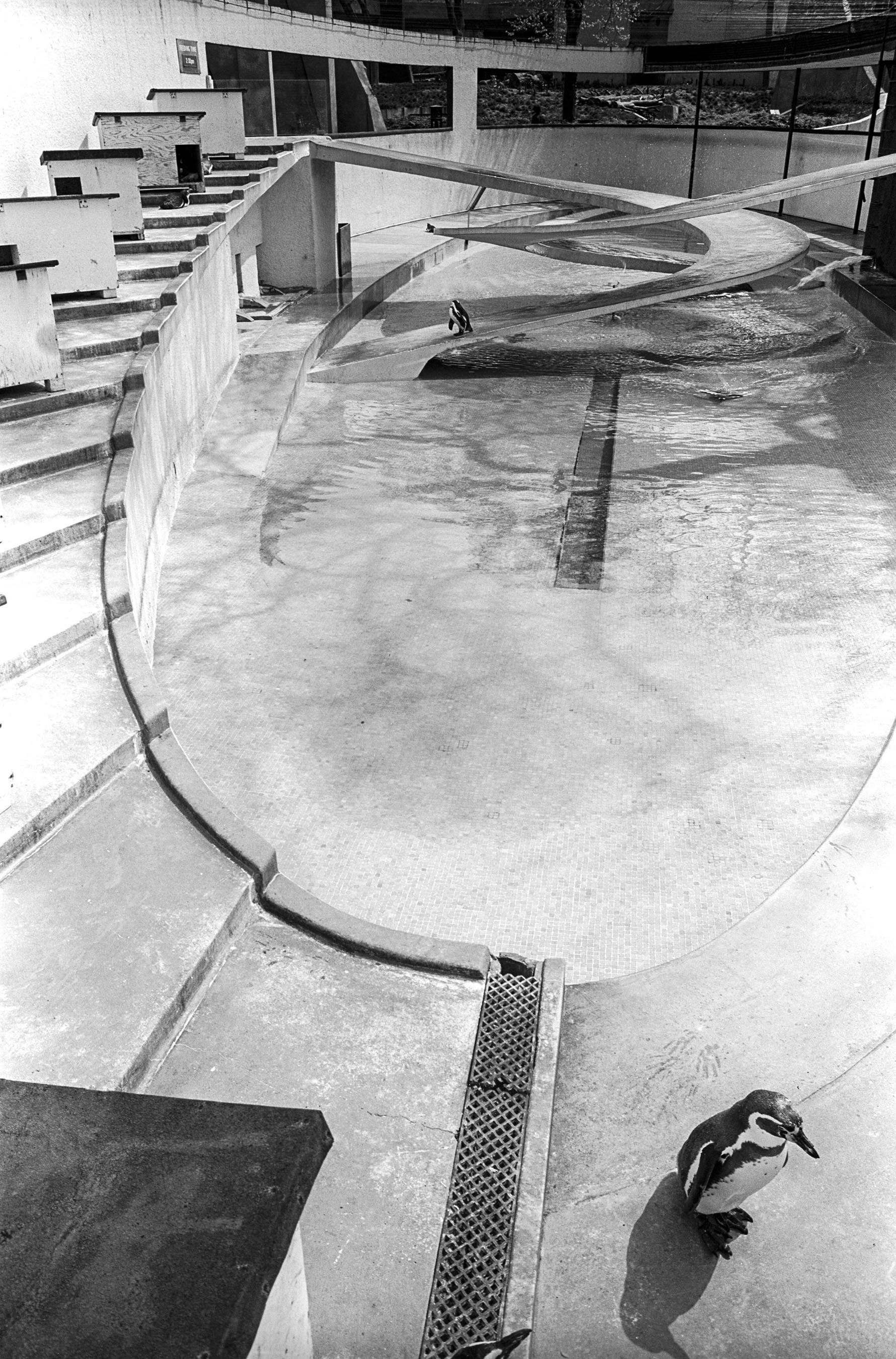
- "A key symbol of British (and International) Modern Movement architecture"

- Location within London Borough of Camden
- 51.534°N 0.1535°W
- Type: House
- Location: London Zoo, Regent's Park, London

History
- Built: 1934

Site notes
- Architect(s): Berthold Lubetkin, Tecton Group
- Architectural style: International Modernist
- Governing body: Zoological Society of London

Listed Building – Grade I
- Official name: Penguin Pool, Zoological Gardens, London NW1
- Designated: 14 September 1970
- Reference no.: 1225665

The Penguin Pool at London Zoo, Regent's Park is a penguin enclosure designed in the International Modernist style by Berthold Lubetkin and the Tecton Group. Constructed in 1934, Historic England describe it as "a key symbol of British (and International) Modern Movement architecture". The pool housed the zoo's collection of penguins for 70 years. Changing attitudes to keeping animals in captivity, and concerns regarding the suitability of the structure for penguin well-being, saw the pool's closure in 2004 and its subsequent replacement by Penguin Beach. After a period of non-use, during which Lubetkin's daughter called for the structure to be "blown to smithereens", the pool was converted into a water feature. It is a Grade I listed building.

== History ==
The Zoological Society of London was founded in 1826 and by 1828 had established a zoological garden in Regent's Park. (Note: Although London Zoo has been described as "the world's first scientific zoo", other examples in Europe pre-date it. The Tiergarten Schönbrunn in Vienna, established in 1752, claims to be the world's oldest, and the Ménagerie du Jardin des plantes in Paris, founded in 1794, was a direct inspiration for the London Zoo.) From its beginnings, the Society employed a series of notable architects to create its buildings: Decimus Burton designed many of the earliest structures, including the Llama and Camel House in 1828, the Ravens' Cage in the same year, and the Giraffe House in 1836; Anthony Salvin Jr. built the Aviary in 1863; Charles Brown Trollope undertook the Stork and Ostrich House in 1896, and Guy Dawber built the Reptile House in 1927. Until the early 20th century, the prevailing view of animal husbandry was that exotic animals would not survive in the colder, Northern European environment and that it was therefore necessary to confine them in shelters. The appointment of Peter Chalmers Mitchell as Secretary of the Society in 1903 saw a change of view, towards creating more natural habitats; Mitchell himself, in conjunction with John James Joass, designed the Mappin Terraces, a series of artificial mountains designed to provided realistic environments for bears and other animals.

In 1933 Mitchell commissioned the designer Berthold Lubetkin and his Tecton Group to design the Gorilla House. (Note: Bridget Cherry in her 2002 revised edition, London 3:North West, of the Buildings of England series, suggests the Lubetkin commission was made by Mitchell's successor, Julian Huxley.) (Note: The Gorilla House is the zoo’s only other Grade I listed building.) Lubetkin, an émigré from Russia who came to Britain in 1931, knew, and was much influenced by, Le Corbusier and the Gorilla House was among the first buildings in Britain constructed in the International Modernist style. The Penguin Pool followed in 1934, "a key symbol of British Modern Movement architecture". The pool was highly experimental for its time and place, being built entirely of reinforced concrete. (Note: Lubetkin subsequently designed buildings at two other zoos, Whipsnade and Dudley.)

The pool was subject to a major restoration in 1986-88, which Bridget Cherry noted had "restored its pristine appearance". Others were more critical. By the early 21st century, the penguins in the pool had begun to exhibit symptoms of bumblefoot, a bacterial infection. It was suggested that the replacement of the original rubber and cork floor covering with concrete and a quartz aggregate during the reconstruction had caused micro-abrasions on the penguins' feet, leading to infection. This led to the closure of the Penguin Pool in 2004, and its later replacement with a new habitat, Penguin Beach, in 2011.

The pool's closure, and the zoo's inability to find an alternative use for it, led to concerns regarding its long-term future. An attempt to house Chinese alligators in the pool was unsuccessful, and drew criticism from The Twentieth Century Society which claimed that “the zoo does not comprehend the aesthetic qualities of its best building”. In 2019, Lubetkin's daughter, Sasha, suggested that it was time to "blow it to smithereens". The pool had been listed by Historic England in 1970 as a Grade I listed structure, its highest possible grade reserved for buildings of "exceptional interest". This made demolition an unlikely option and the zoo subsequently announced plans to restore the pool as a water feature.

In 2022 the pool was prominently used as a location in the music video for As It Was, the lead single from the third studio album by Harry Styles.

== Architecture and description ==
Lubetkin worked on the design of the pool with members of the Tecton Group and with his engineer, Ove Arup. The structure has an elliptical pool at its centre, with "cantilevered interlocking spiral ramps", seemingly without support, crossing the centre of the pool, a glass-fronted diving area, and an enclosure with nesting boxes at one end. A viewing gallery runs around the exterior. It is constructed of reinforced concrete and covered in white cement render. Arup’s construction expertise in concrete was both critical and groundbreaking: arguing that concrete slabs, cast as one element with the joints as strong as the central spans, would enable architects to achieve any length and shape, he was instrumental in achieving the spiral ramps. The Victoria and Albert Museum, in its 2016 exhibition, Engineering the World: Ove Arup and the Philosophy of Total Design, described the pool as proposing "a new direction for British architecture, [and] also one of the first to demonstrate the expressive and structural potential of reinforced concrete." Other critics have been less certain of the structure’s value: in an article in the Architectural Review, Polly Gould wrote; “the experimental architectural form is not for the animals, but for the visual pleasure of the human audience”. Lubetkin himself also expressed doubts; speaking some forty years after the pool’s construction, he suggested, “the philosophical aims and orderly character of those designs are diametrically opposed to the intellectual climate in which we live…these buildings cry out for a world which has never come into being.”

== Gallery ==
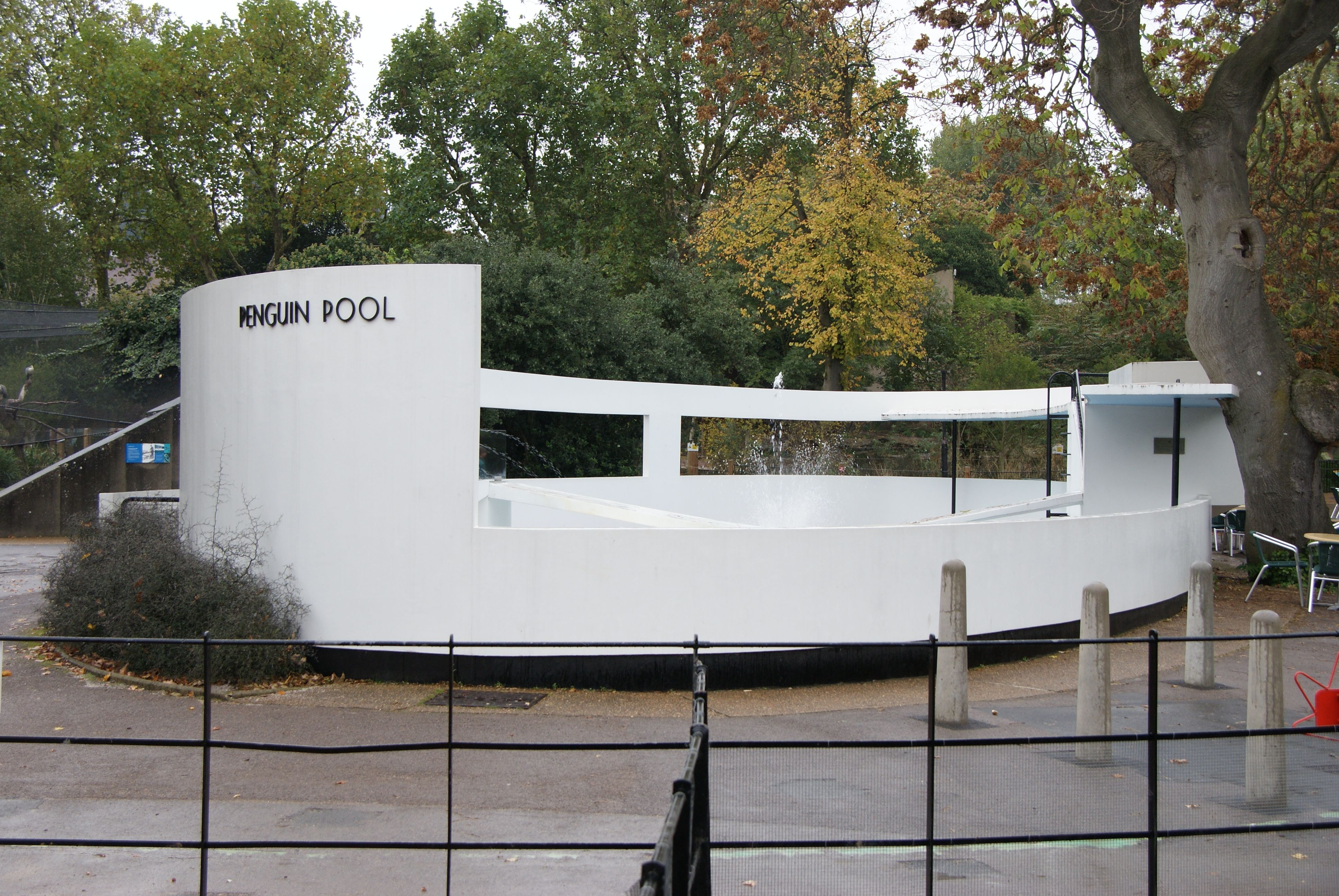
Exterior

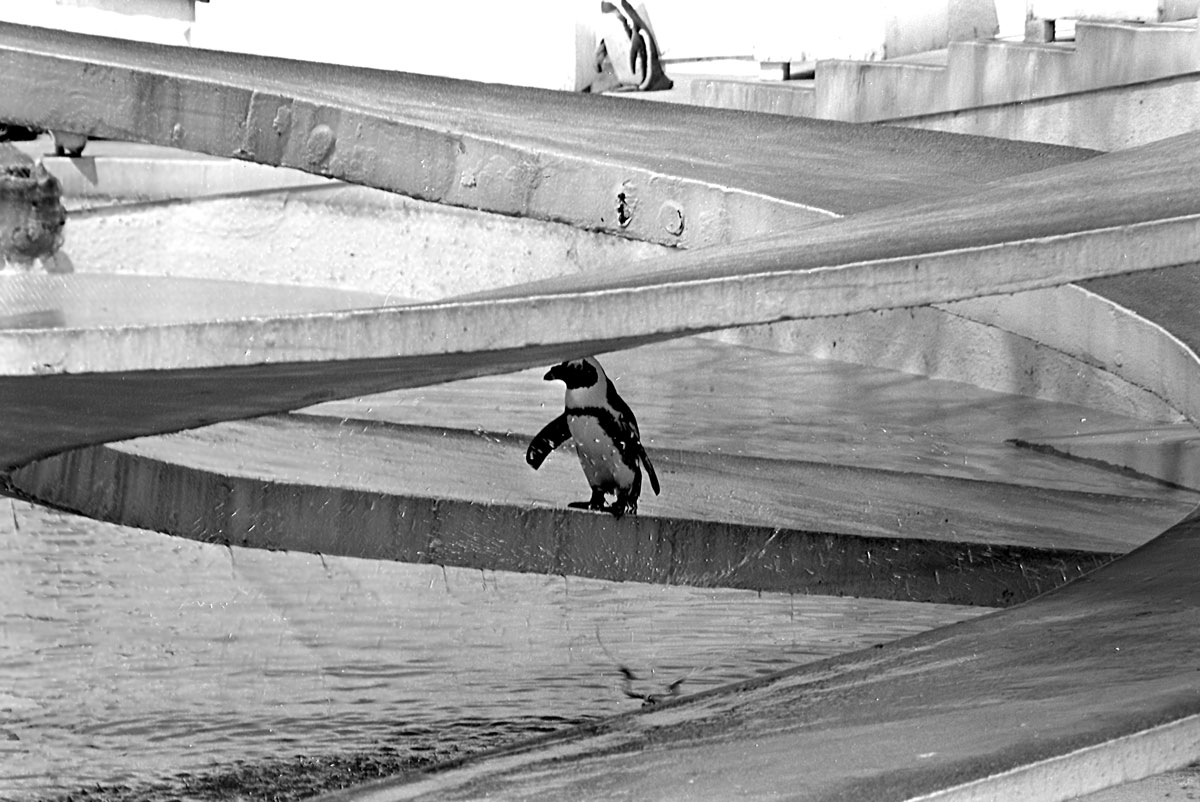
The helix ramps with penguins

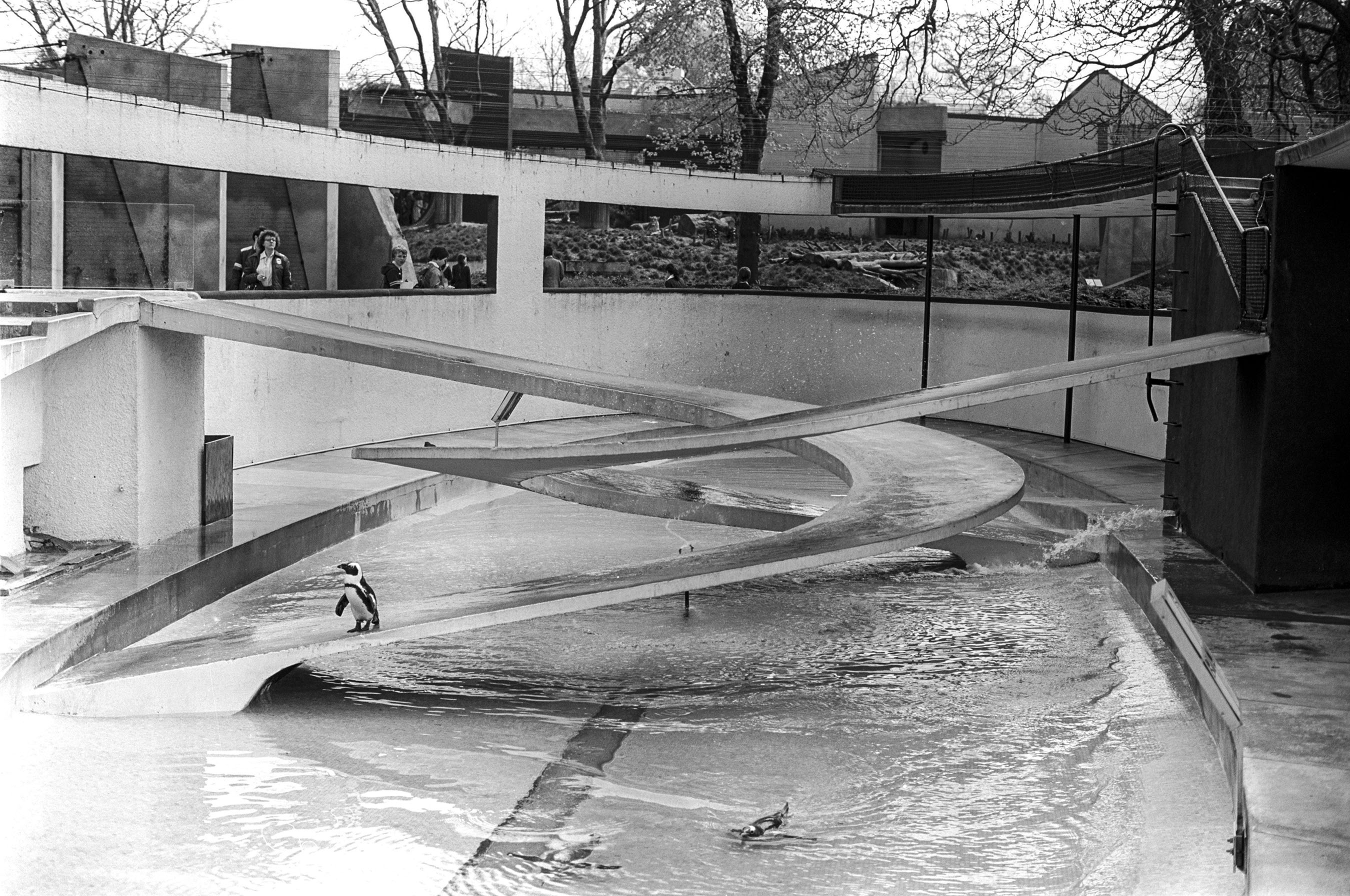
A view of the pool from the 1970s

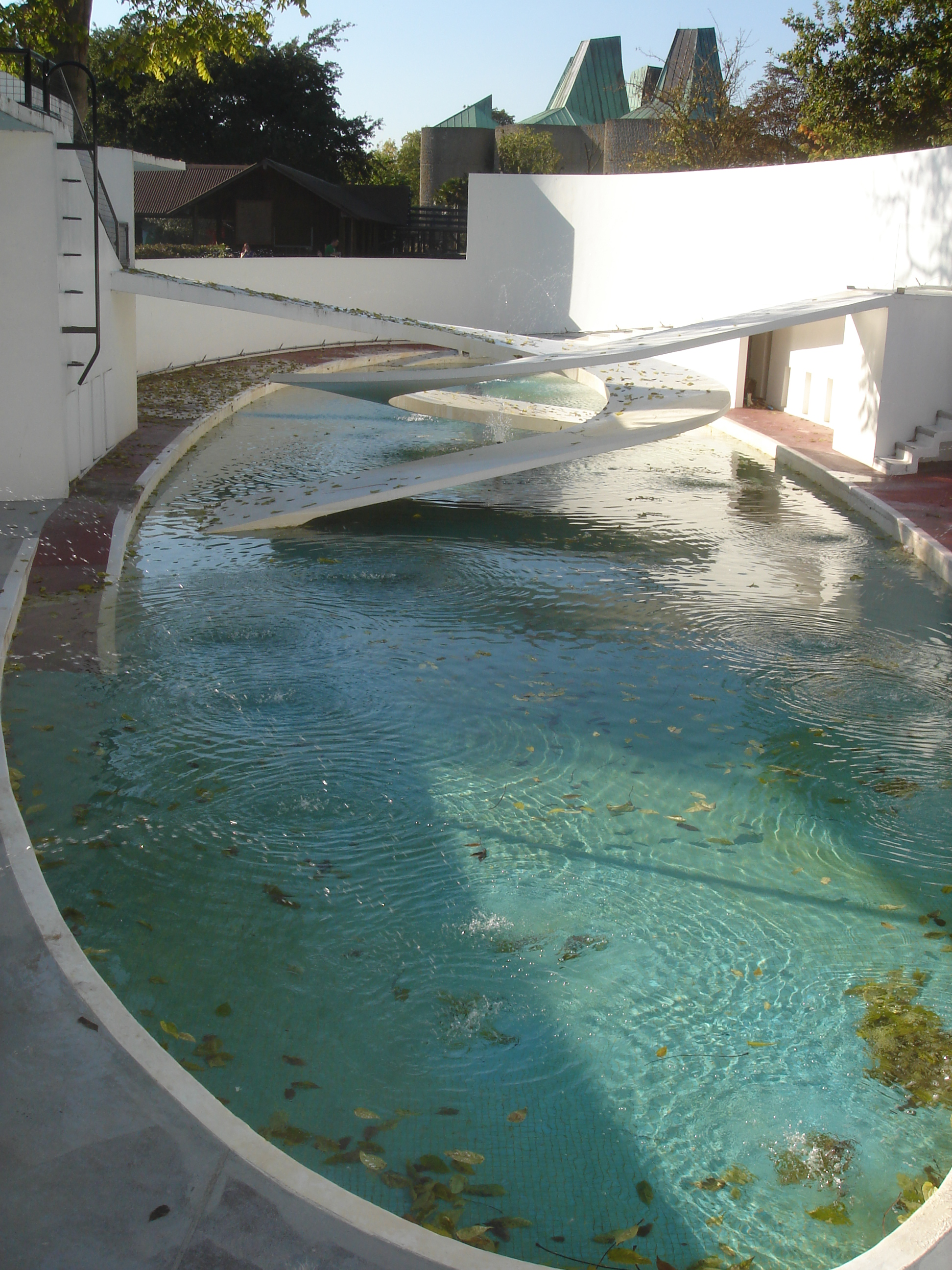
The pool after closure

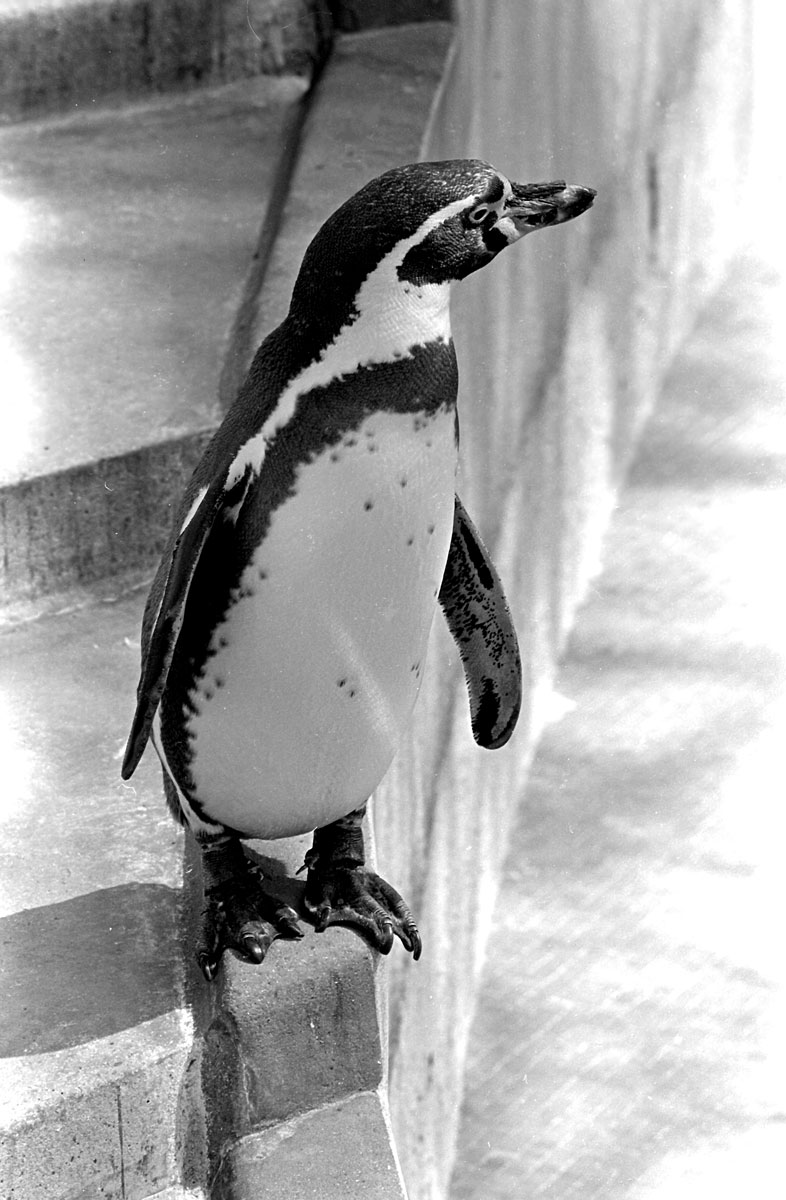
A penguin at the pool’s edge

== Sources ==
- Cherry, Bridget; Pevsner, Nikolaus (2002). London 3 North West. The Buildings of England. New Haven, US and London: Yale University Press. ISBN 978-0-300-09652-1.
