= Robert Lutyens =

English interior designer (1901–1972)

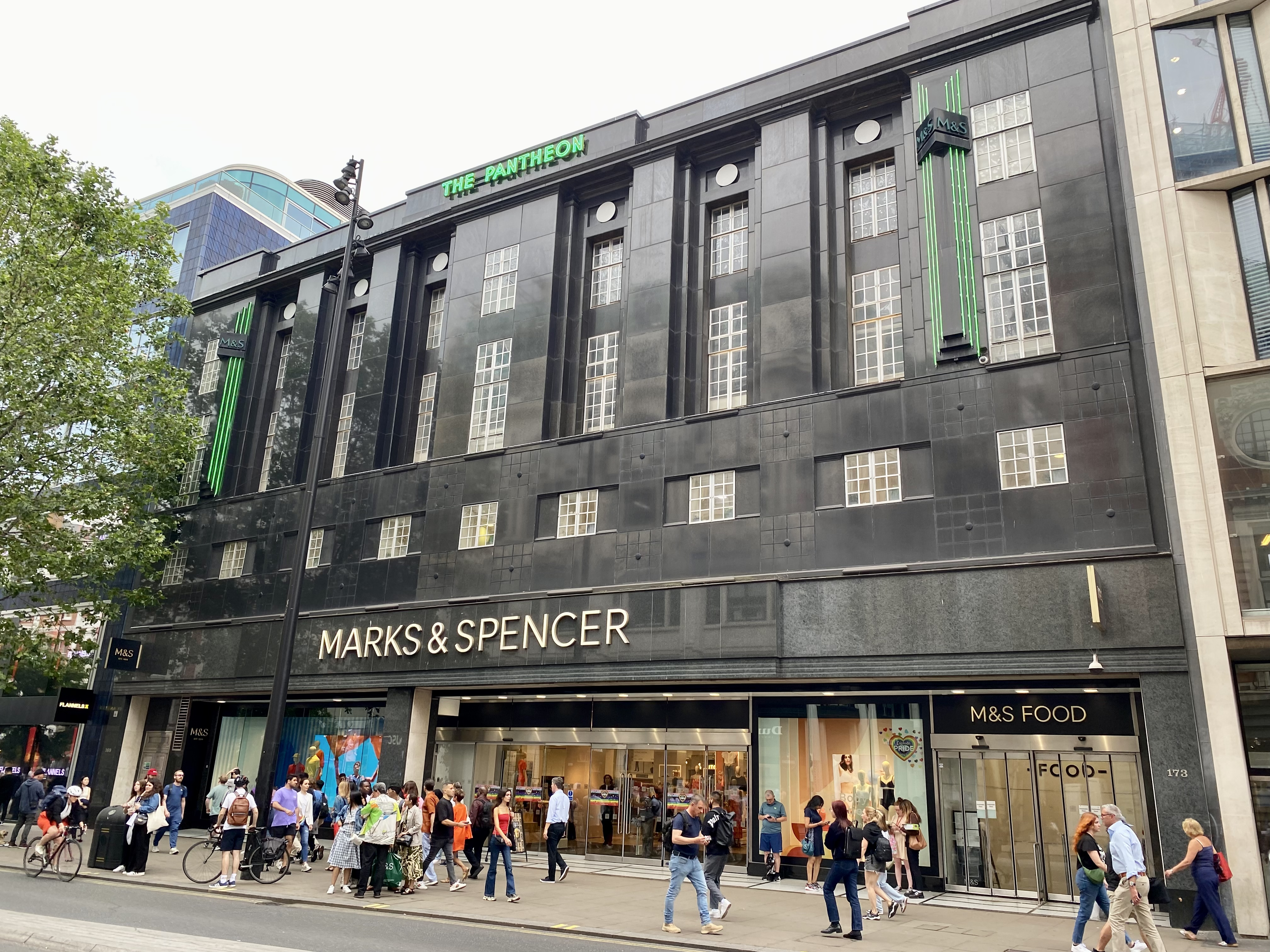
The ebony granite façade of the Pantheon (Marks and Spencers), 169-173 Oxford Street, was designed by Lutyens in 1938.

Robert Lutyens (13 June 1901 – 1972) was an English interior designer, the son of the architect Sir Edwin Lutyens. He designed the interiors of the homes of several of the directors of Marks & Spencer and subsequently joined the board of that company in 1934. He worked with J.M. Monro & Son to create a modular design scheme for the façades of over 40 Marks & Spencer stores. He also painted.

== Selected publications ==
- Sir Edwin Lutyens an appreciation in perspective by his son. 1942
- An understanding of architecture. People's Universities Press, London, 1948. (With Harold Greenwood)
- Six great architects. 1959
