= The Salutation, Sandwich =

House in Kent, England

Coordinates: 51.274444°N 1.344447°E

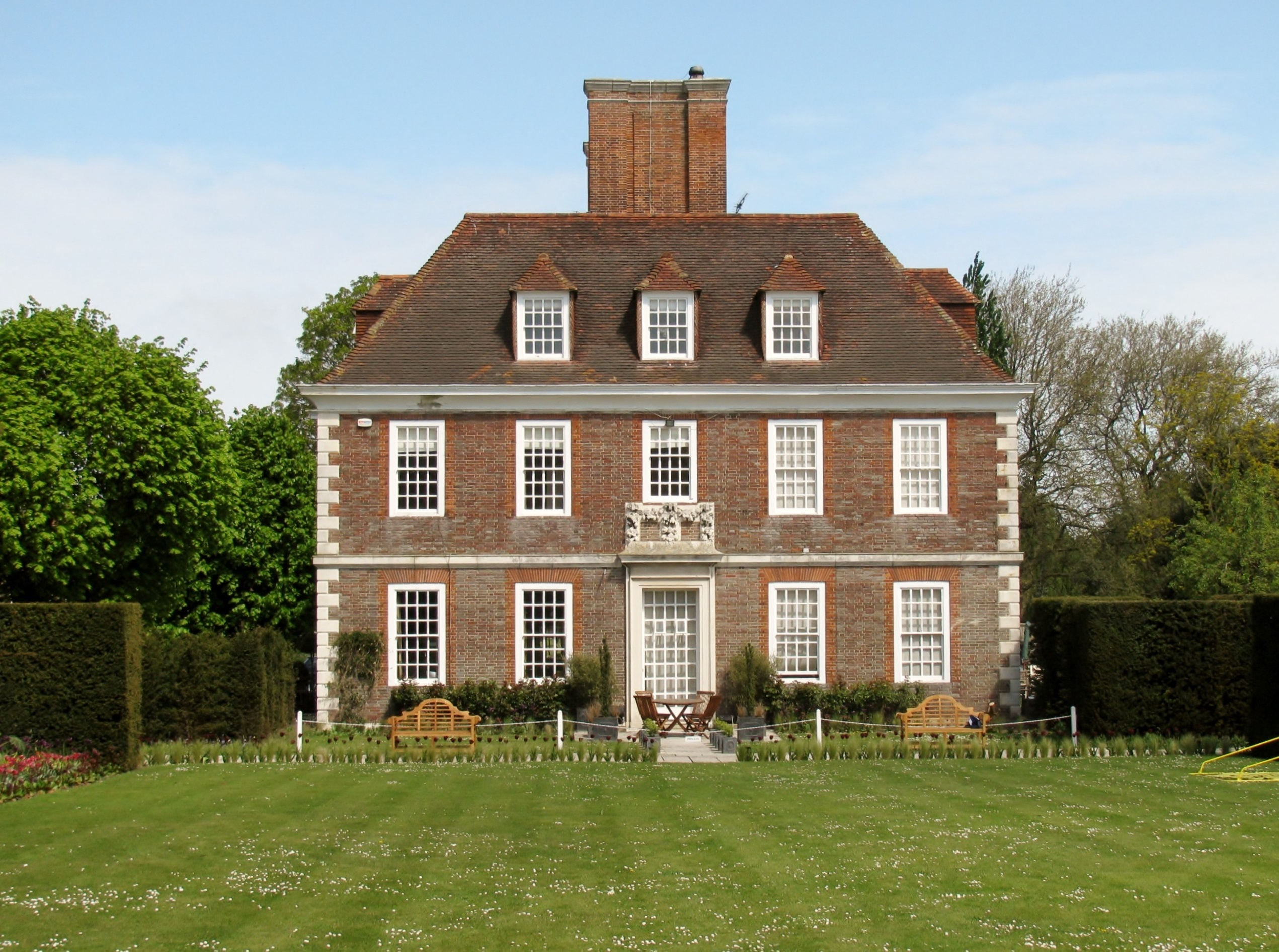
The Salutation, Sandwich, south front

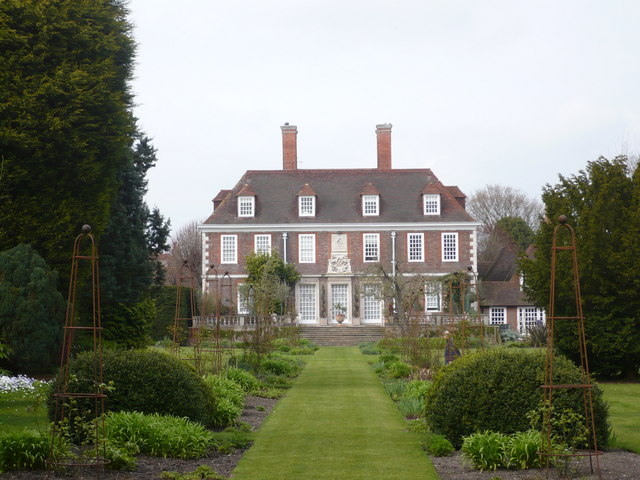
The Salutation, Sandwich, east front

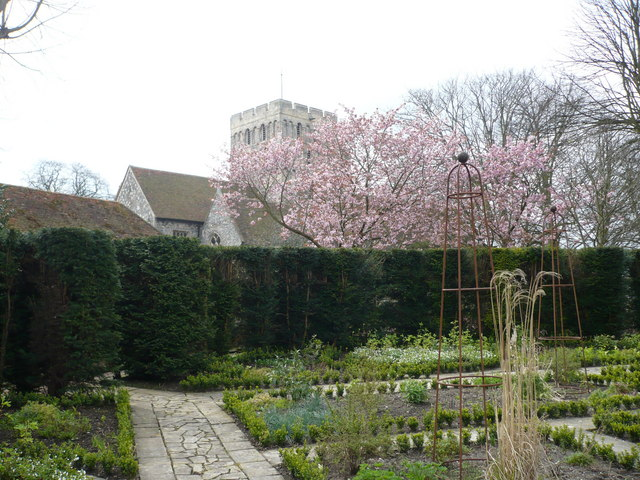
View south to St Clement's church, from the garden

The Salutation is a grade I listed house in Sandwich, Kent, England. It was designed and built by Edwin Lutyens in a Queen Anne style in 1911–12, as a weekend home and country retreat for members of the Farrer family. It was one of the first 20th-century buildings to be given a grade I listing, in 1950. Other structures in the grounds received a grade II listing in 1986. It has been described by Nigel Jones as "the perfect house that many in Britain aspire to own", and by Arthur Stanley George Butler as "Sir Edwin's supreme rendering of the full Georgian idiom … This very perfect work establishes itself as a high peak in Sir Edwin's achievement".

Following restoration, it operated as a hotel and restaurant from 2017. It went into liquidation in 2020.

== House ==
The house is at eastern end of Upper Strand Street in Sandwich, with the Quay beside the River Stour to the north and St Clement's church to the south. It is named after an inn that used to occupy part of the site. The plot of 3.7 acres (1.5 ha) is surrounded by boundary walls of flint, stone and brick, including part of the Sandwich town wall, and the site includes several older grade II ancillary buildings.

The main entrance leads east from Knightrider Street, through an arch formed by Lutyens through two-storey 18th century brick buildings, supported by a plaster cornice, to a forecourt in front of the west façade of the house. The main house is a rectangular red brick block with stone quoins, comprising two storeys, plus attic and semi-basement. The west front is symmetrical with seven bays, the central bay and two neighbouring narrow bays projecting slightly, topped by a tile hipped roof with three dormer windows and two tall brick chimney stacks. A single-storey wing to the north was originally servants' quarters, in a more vernacular Kentish style also with two tall brick chimneys. The east façade similarly has seven bays, with three French windows on the ground floor and a sundial in the central bay of the first floor, and four dormer windows in the roof. The south façade has five bays and three dormers.

The interior, approximately 1,060 square metres (11,400 sq ft) excluding the attic, is based on a Palladian 3×3 grid, with an unusual cut-out in the north façade to allow light to reach the central stairs, creating a U-shape. Steps sweep up from the forecourt to double entrance doors in the west façade, with carved stone door case and broken pediment. The reception hall has two corkscrew columns, and leads to five principal rooms on the ground floor: one to either side of the hall – the wood-panelled library and another room – and three across the east front – a kitchen, oval dining room and drawing room. A passageway leads to the single-storey north wing, which includes the main kitchen. Stairs lead down to the cellar, and a wide central staircase provides access to the bedrooms on the first and second floors.

== Gardens ==
Three sets of French windows from the dining room lead out of the east front to a garden terrace, with stone steps down to a rectangular garden to the east which has wide mixed borders containing herbaceous plants and shrubs. The garden was probably also originally designed by Lutyens, but inspired by his collaborations with Gertrude Jekyll (no record remains of her direct involvement). A further triangular area of the garden lies the south, with yew hedges and roses. The 3.7 acres (1.5 ha) gardens also include a kitchen garden and tropical garden, an informal water garden to the north with "Lake Patricia" installed in the 1960s, extensive collections of dahlias and echinops, a jungle garden, and an avenue of holm oaks.

The gardens took several years to recover from seawater flooding after Cyclone Xaver caused a tidal surge on the River Stour on 6 December 2013.

== History ==
Henry Farrer, son of solicitor Sir William Farrer, commissioned Sir Edwin Lutyens to design and build the house in 1911–12. It was occupied by Henry and his two brothers (all bachelors) William (also solicitor, like Henry and their father) and Gaspard Farrer (a partner at Barings Bank). Lutyens also build a town house for the brothers at 7 St James's Square, and renovated the premises of the law firm Farrer & Co in Lincoln's Inn Fields.

After the death of Henry Farrer, the house was inherited by his brother Gaspard. Following Gaspard's death in 1948, it was bought by sculptor Leonard Harold Robert Byng. It was sold in 1977 and run as a plant nursery. Items on the house were published in Country Life in 13 and 20 September 1962, 10 September 1981 and 1 September 1983.

After various proposals for redevelopment were rejected, the house remained in private ownership. It was sold for £2.6 million in 2004 to Dominic and Stephanie Parker, who renovated the house and garden, and used it to run an up-market bed and breakfast establishment. They later became known from their appearances on Channel 4's television programme Gogglebox. The B&B appeared in episode 19 of the fourth series of Channel 4's Four in a Bed in 2013. The house was put up for sale in April 2013 for £4.5 million, but did not sell.

After a period of refurbishment, the building reopened as a 17 bedroom hotel, and restaurant in 2017. It was closed in January 2020.
