= Little Thakeham =

Country house in West Sussex

Coordinates: 50°55′49″N 0°25′24″W

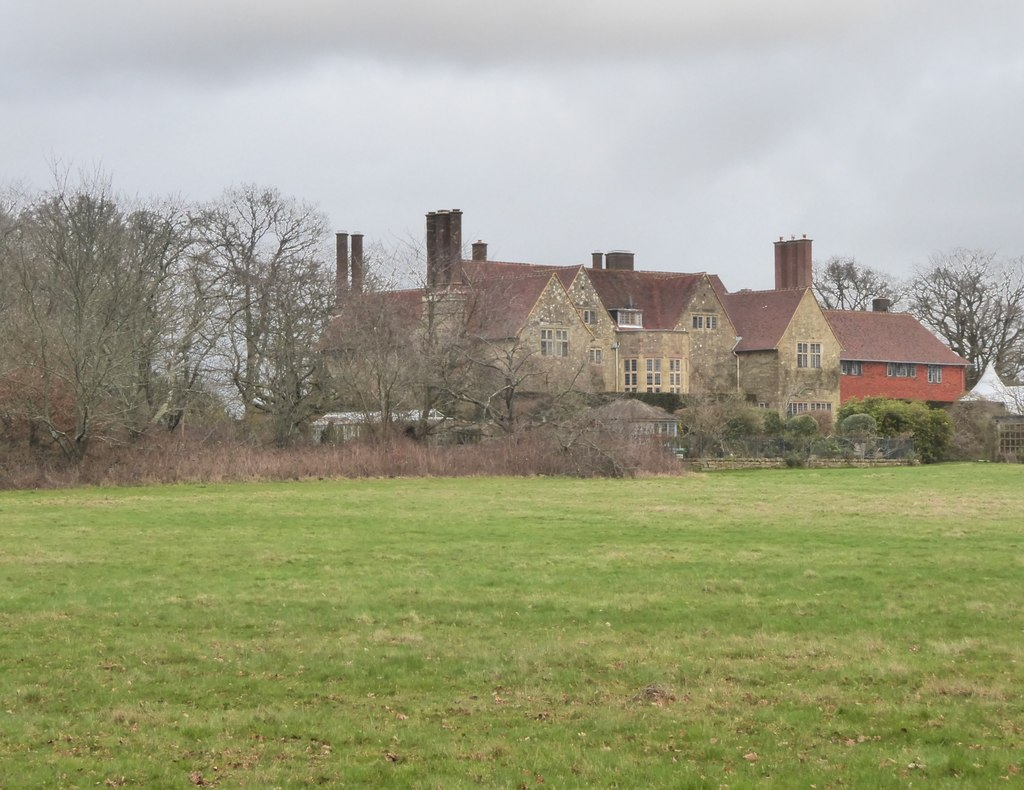
Little Thakeham

Little Thakeham is an Arts and Crafts style, Grade I listed private house in the parish of Thakeham, near the village of Storrington, in the Horsham district of West Sussex, England. Designed by architect Edwin Lutyens in 1902, the house was one of the first in which Lutyens mixed neoclassical architecture into his previously vernacular style. The exterior of the house is vernacular, but the interior has classical features, particularly in its large hall. The gardens, also designed by Lutyens, are Grade II* listed in the National Register of Historic Parks and Gardens.

== House ==
Lutyens' client was Ernest Blackburn, formerly the headmaster of a preparatory school in Southborough, Kent, who had retired on receiving an inheritance from his father, a wine merchant. His main interest was gardening. Over 1901–2 he made a series of land purchases, creating an estate of 130 acres (53 hectares), and devoted himself to landscaping it. He commissioned the architect F. Hatchard Smith to build a house on the site, but by April 1902 Blackburn was dissatisfied with the half-built brick villa. He brought in Lutyens, who advised him to demolish it, which he did. Hatchard Smith accused Lutyens of poaching his client, and the dispute was played out in the pages of Building News, which supported Hatchard Smith, and Country Life, which supported Lutyens.

Completed in 1903, the 12,480 sf house is considered one of Lutyens' best private houses. Laid out in an H-shape using locally mined coarse-stone, the exterior has weathered quickly to give the house a 16th-century, Cotswolds manor look. It consists of two storeys plus an attic, with two wings. The central bar of the H runs west to east, and contains the south-facing hall. Further to the east, continuing the line of the central bar, is an additional wing, originally the service quarters, which contains the only remaining walls of Hatchard Smith's demolished villa. The south, garden front of the house has four gables, one on each wing and two in the middle; at the centre is a two-storey, mullioned, polygonal bay window. The north, entrance front of the house has a central porch giving access to an east–west corridor, south of which are the main staircase and the two-storey hall, separated by a stone screen. The hall is lit through a classical arch by the two-storey bay window. The ground floor of the hall is lined with classically decorated stonework, with plaster walls above, and is overlooked by wrought iron balconies.

== Gardens ==
Southwards from the house's garden front there are three descending terrace gardens, supported by retaining walls. The top terrace contains a rose garden. To its east are a lily pool and water garden. The third terrace is the main lawn. On its western side, a large, oak-beamed pergola on a raised bank projects out from the second terrace. There is also a Grade II listed garden house, originally a coach house with stables, designed by Lutyens. The gardens are surrounded by apple, pear and cherry orchards.

== Gallery ==
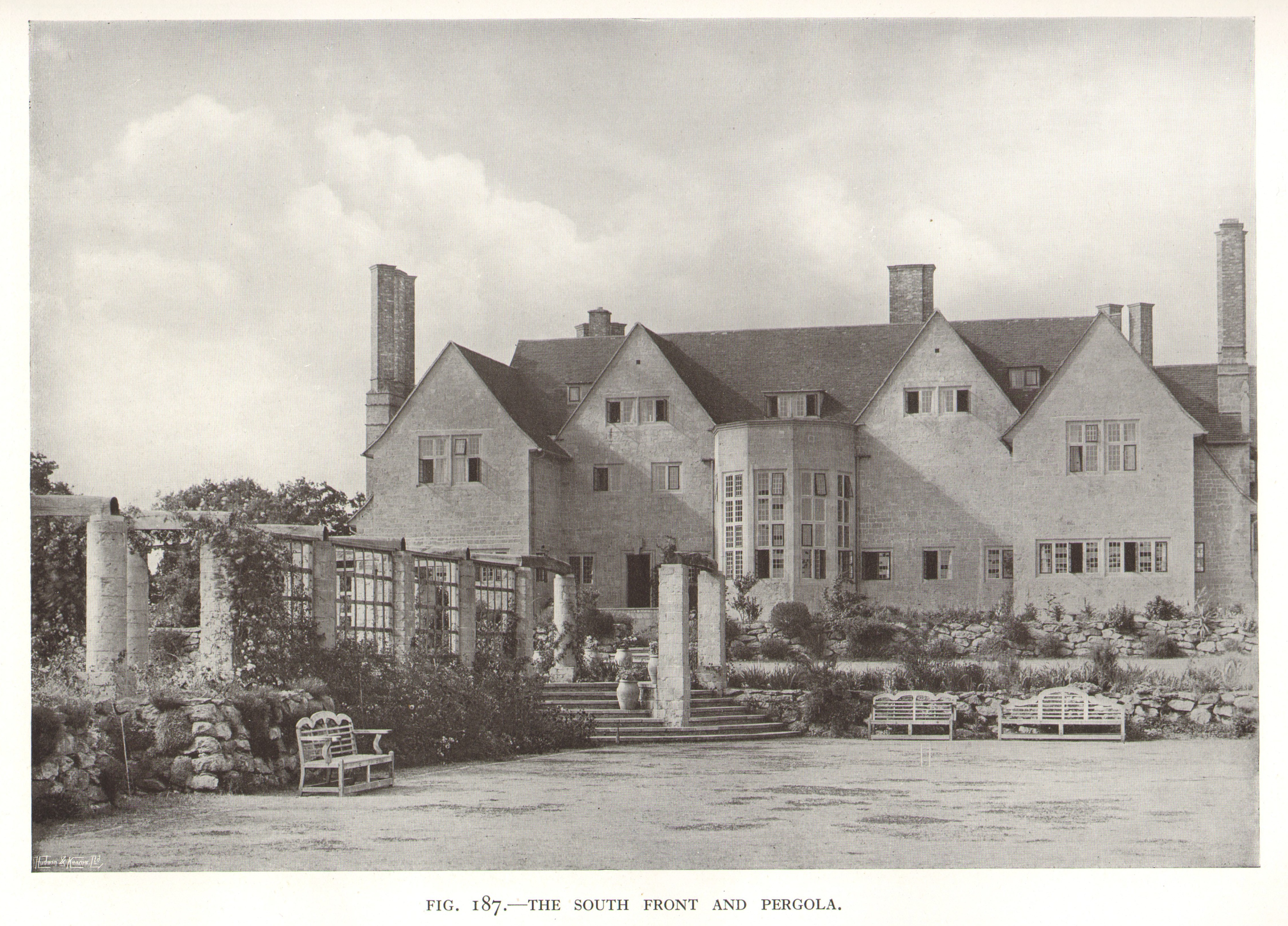
South front and pergola, (Weaver, 1913)

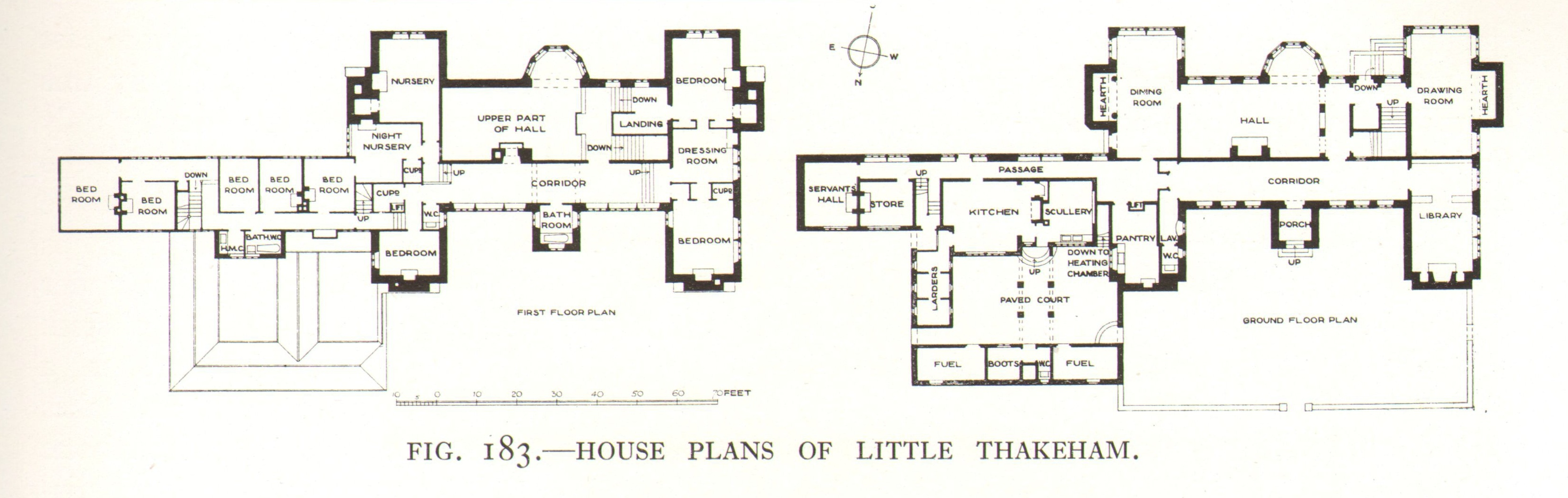
House plans, (South front at top)

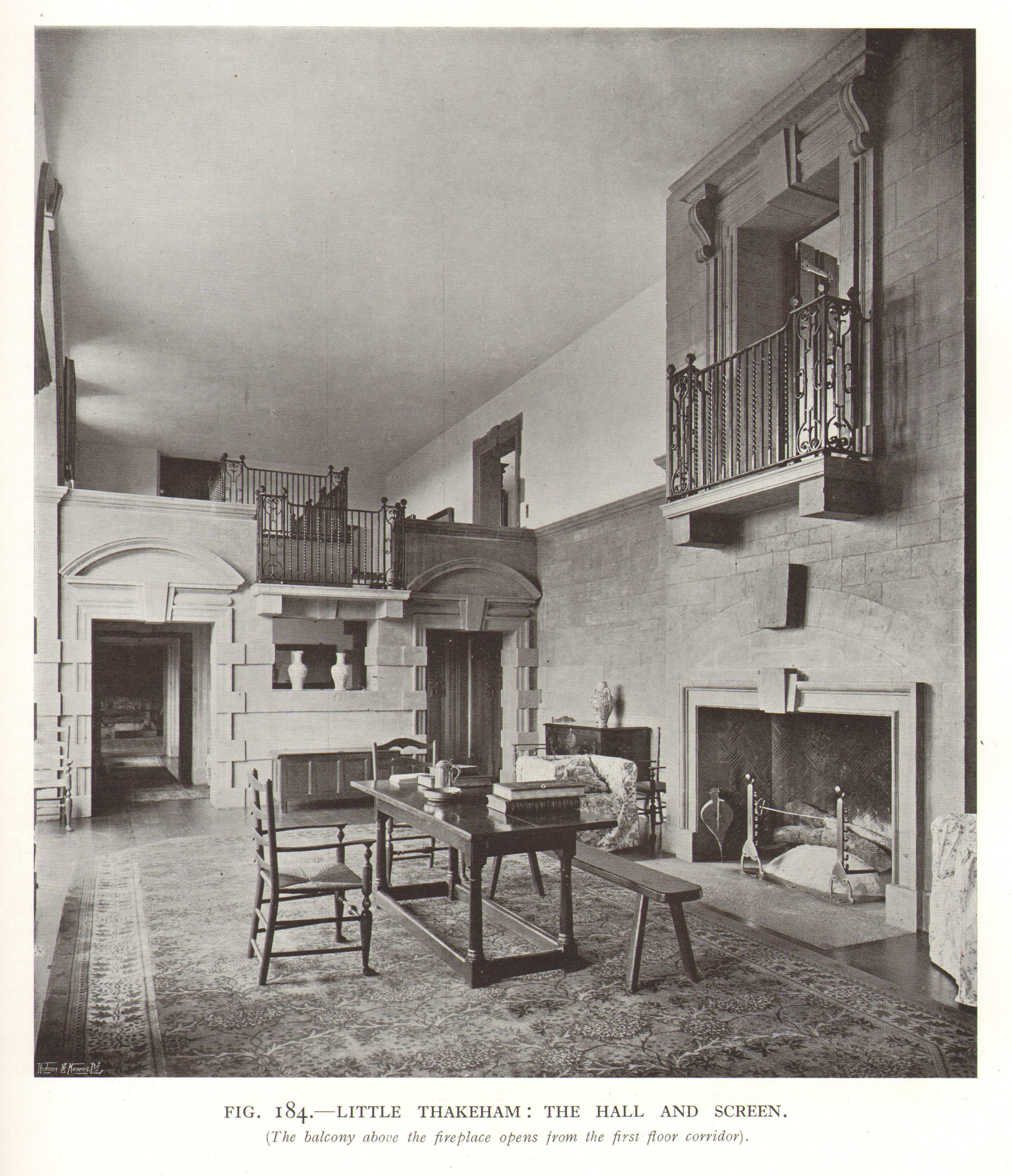
The neoclassical hall

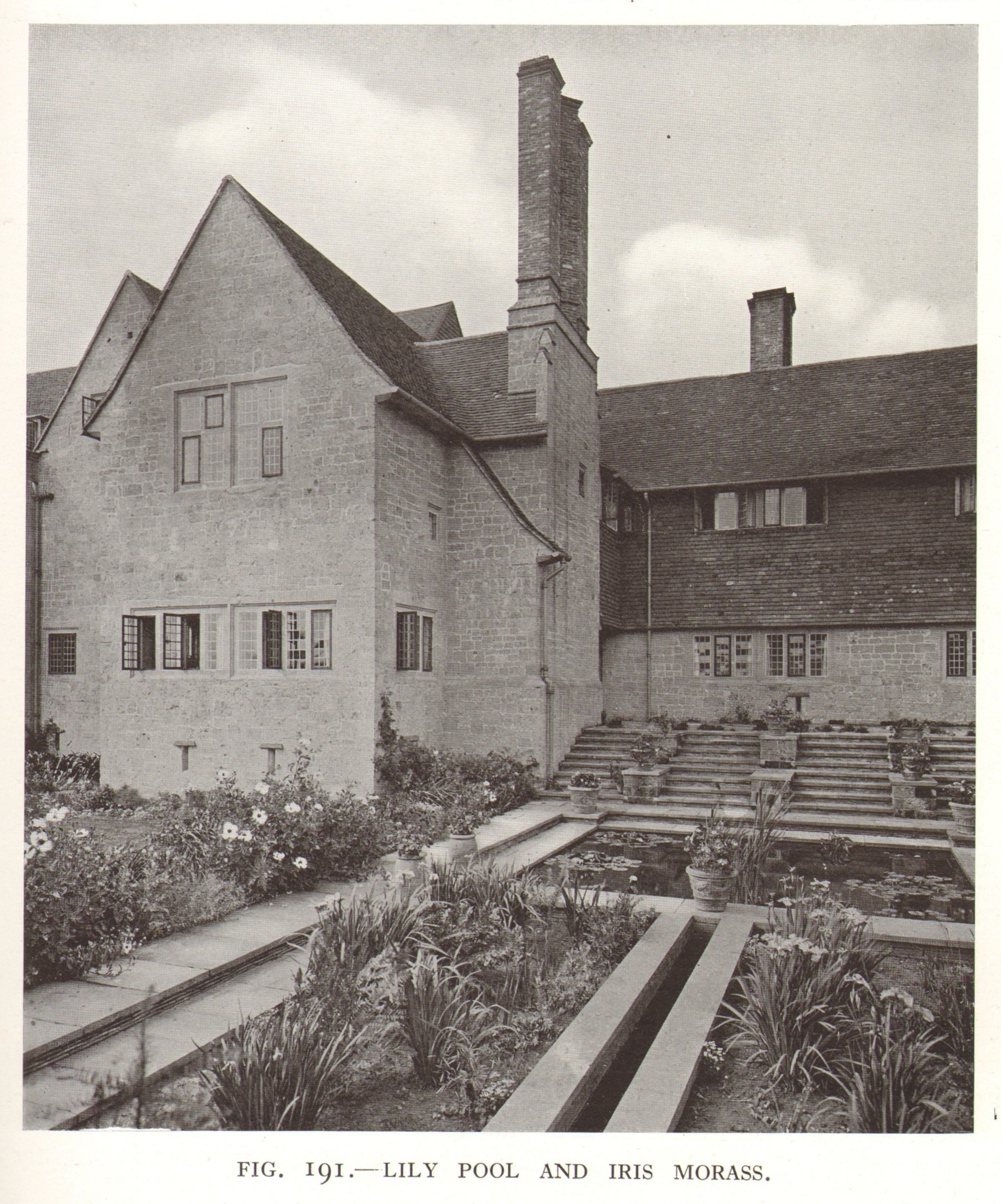
Lily pool
