= Preston Cenotaph =

War memorial in Lancashire, England

- England
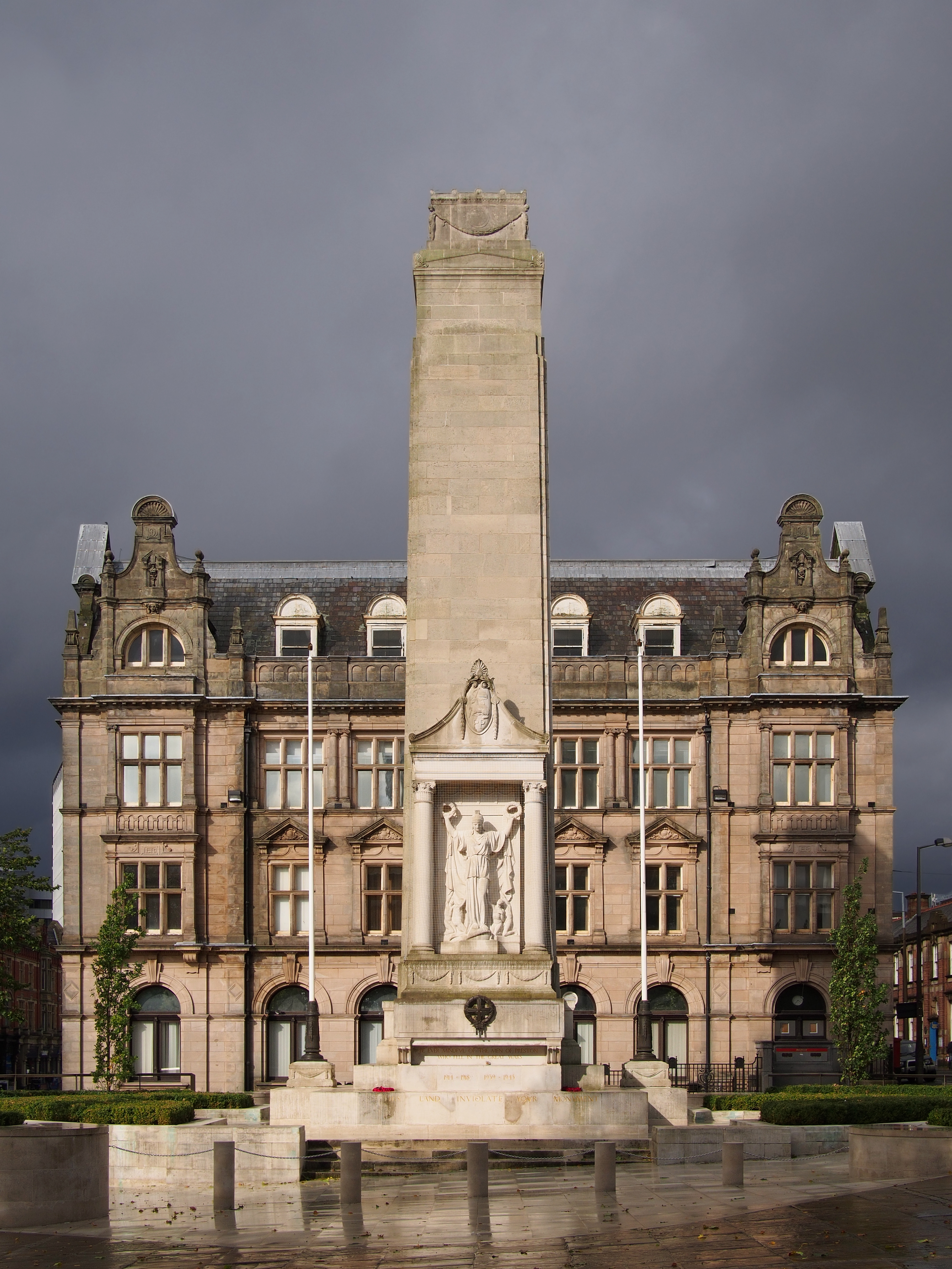
- Preston Cenotaph
- For the dead of World War I and World War II.
- Established: 1926
- Unveiled: 13 June 1926
- Location: 53.75944°N 2.69940°W; Preston, Lancashire
- Designed by: Sir Giles Gilbert Scott
- BE EVER MINDFUL OF THE MEN OF PRESTON WHO FELL IN THE GREAT WARS 1914–1918 1939–1945 THIS LAND INVIOLATE YOUR MONUMENT

Listed Building – Grade I
- Official name: War memorial cenotaph
- Designated: 20 December 1991
- Reference no.: 1218458

The Preston Cenotaph stands in Market Square, Preston, Lancashire, England, and is a monument to servicemen from Preston who perished in World War I and II. Unveiled on 13 June 1926, the memorial was designed by Sir Giles Gilbert Scott with sculptural work by Henry Alfred Pegram.

== The monument ==
The monument's main feature is a figure of "Victory" whose arms are raised and who holds laurel wreaths in either hand. The figure stands within columns supporting a pediment and on either side of the "Victory" figure are representations of those who died said to be "pleading for acceptance of their sacrifice". At the very top of the monument there is an empty coffin (hence "cenotaph" or "empty tomb") with cherubs and strands of foliage carved around it. There are flagpoles on either side of the monument. The memorial was unveiled on 13 June 1926 by Admiral of the Fleet Earl Jellicoe of Scapa.

The main inscription reads:

BE EVER MINDFUL OF THE MEN OF PRESTON
WHO FELL IN THE GREAT WARS
1914–1918 1939–1945
THIS LAND INVIOLATE YOUR MONUMENT

The names of those World War I servicemen honoured are contained in a Roll of Honour located in the Harris Museum. This Roll of Honour is inscribed on marble tablets on the ground floor of the building. The names of some 2,000 Prestonians are thus recorded (Note: The Harris Reference Library also holds the original submission forms for inclusion on this Roll of Honour. The families of the deceased had had to complete forms if they wanted their loved ones to be included on the Roll. These were then submitted to the council between 1916 and 1927 and the work was completed on the basis of these names in 1927. It has been calculated that over 400 names were omitted from the Roll of Honour because the required forms had not been submitted, this for a variety of reasons.) Details of seven people whose names were omitted from the original listings were discovered and a framed document recording their names was installed in 1998.

No Roll of Honour was produced for those who lost their lives in the Second World War but the Cenotaph remembers the deceased of both World Wars.

== 2012 restoration ==
In 2012 the cenotaph was restored . The work, which cost £835,600, was finished in the autumn and included the carving of a new dedication to the people of the city who lost their lives in service since 1945. As part of Preston's commemorations of the outbreak of World War I, it was re-dedicated in a service on 13 June, 88 years since the original unveiling.

On 23 November 2013 the cenotaph was the focus of an event by the artist Andy McKeown. Funded by Arts Council England, the event used material from the collections of the Harris Museum and the Lancashire Infantry Museum to highlight the lives of some of Preston's war dead. Every name from the roll of honour was projected onto the cenotaph.

== Gallery ==
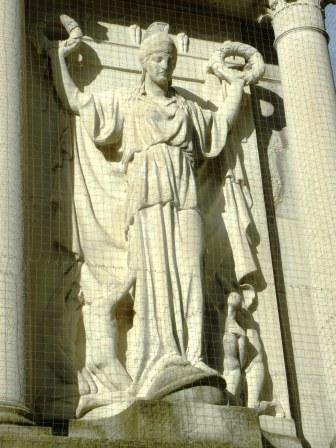
The main feature, "Victory"

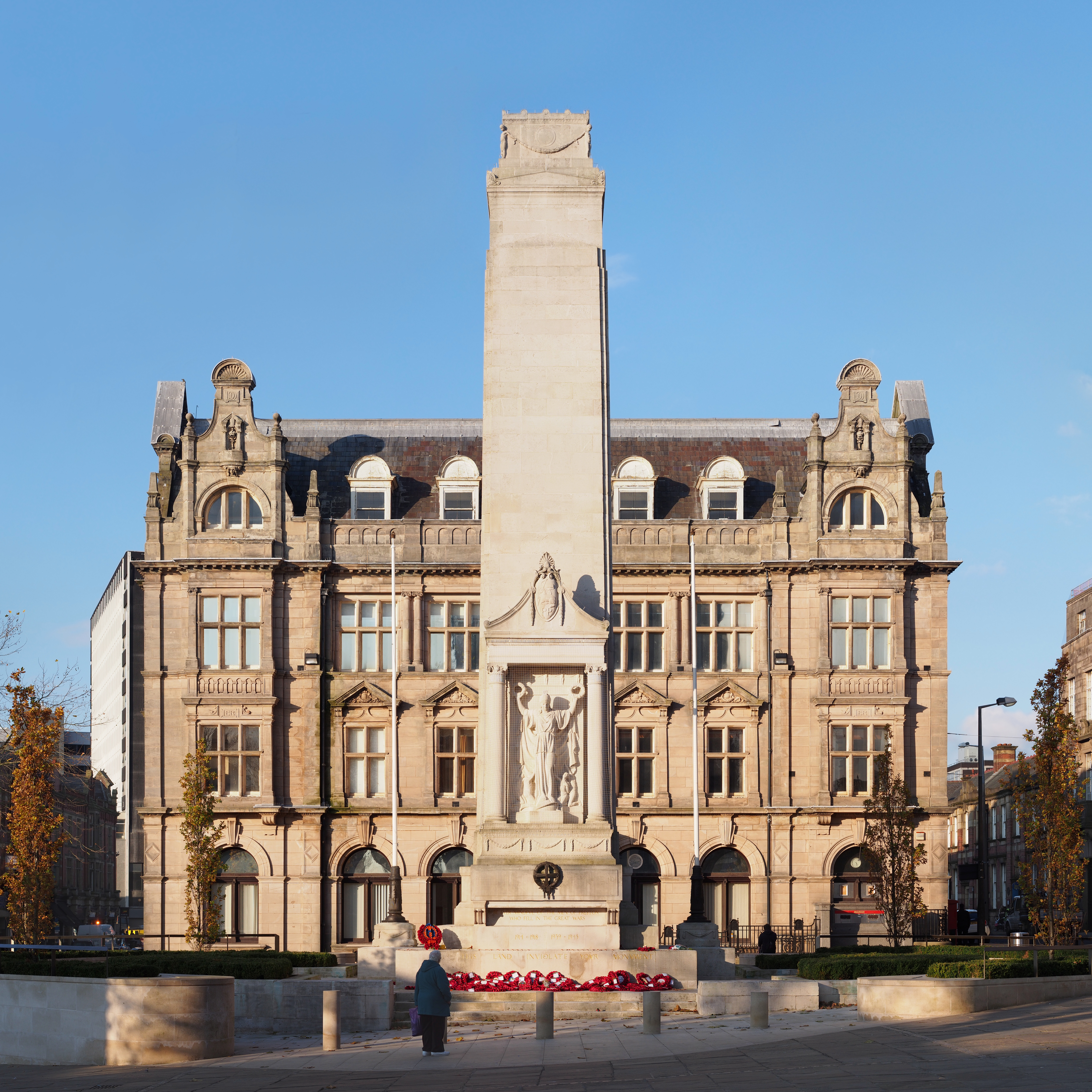
Cenotaph with wreaths laid for Remembrance Day (panorama)

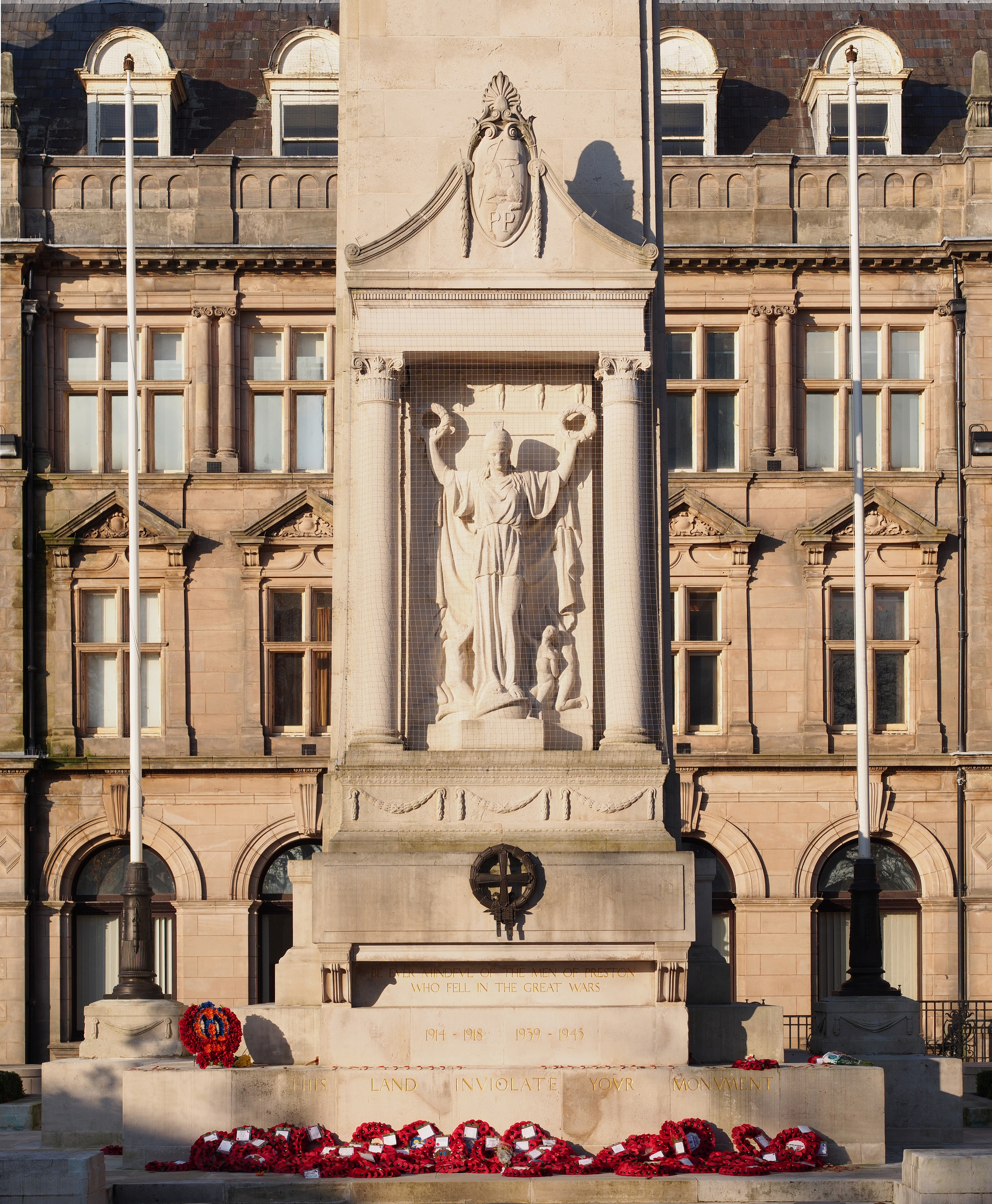
Close up of the main feature

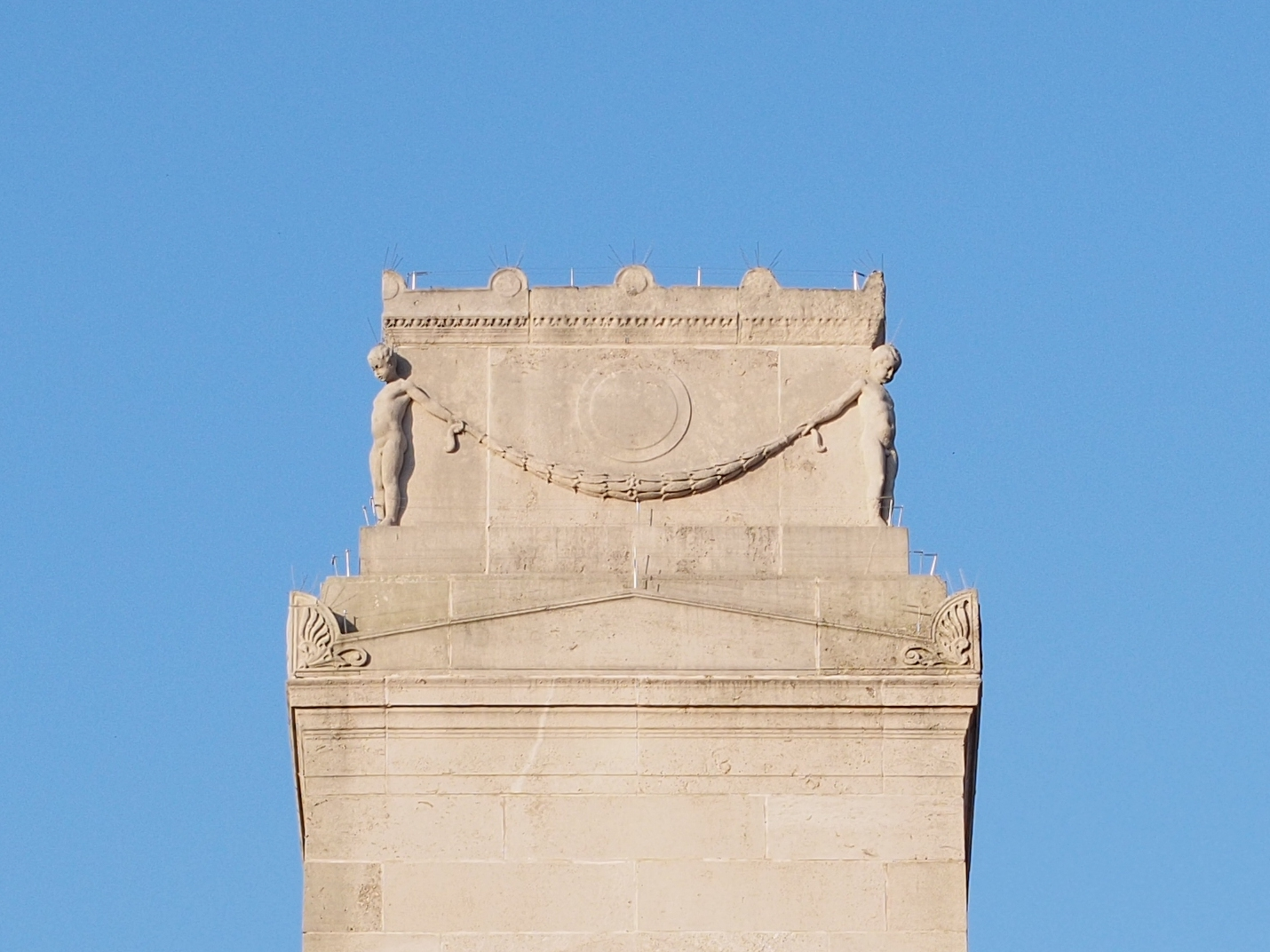
The empty coffin on the top of Preston Cenotaph

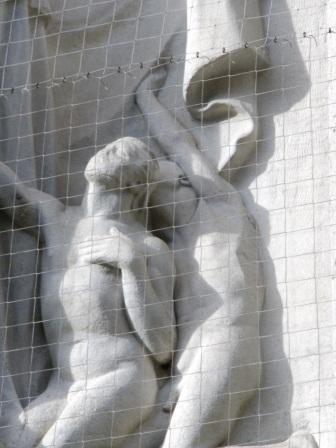
Figures on one side of the Cenotaph-The dead "pleading for acceptance of their sacrifice".

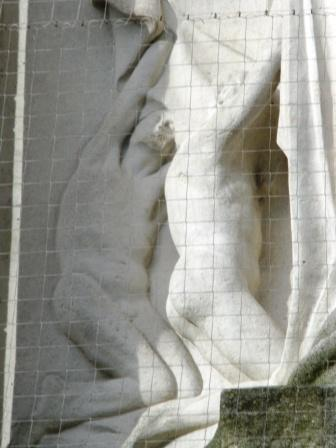
Figures on another side of the Cenotaph- The dead "pleading for acceptance of their sacrifice".

== See also ==
- Listed buildings in Preston, Lancashire
- Grade I listed war memorials in England
