= Edmund Sedding =

English architect and musician

Edmund Sedding (20 June 1836 – 1868) was an English architect and musician.

== Biography ==
Sedding, son of Richard and Peninnah Sedding of Summerstown, near Okehampton, Devon, was born on 20 June 1836: John Dando Sedding was his younger brother. He early displayed antiquarian tastes, which led to his visiting cathedrals, abbeys, and churches in England and France. In 1853 he entered the office of George Edmund Street, where he devoted himself to the study of Gothic architecture. For some time he resided as an architect in Bristol, and, after again spending a period in London, removed about 1862 to Penzance, where he obtained a large practice.

In Cornwall he built or restored the churches of Gwithian, Wendron, Altarnun, North Hill, Ruan Major (modified during restoration), St. Peter's, Newlyn, and St Stephens by Launceston, while he had in progress at the time of his death a new church, St Martin's at Marple in Cheshire, together with its rectory and two churches in Wales, the restoration of Bigbury church, and a mansion at Hayle for Mr. W. J. Rawlings.

Sedding was a performer on the harmonium and organ, and an admirer of ancient church music. He was for a time precentor of the church of St. Raphael the Archangel, Bristol, and organist of St. Mary the Virgin, Soho. He greatly exerted himself in the revival of carol singing, and his books of Christmas carols were very popular.

In 1865 his health failed, and he died at Penzance on 11 June 1868, being buried at Madron on 16 June.

He married, on 18 August 1862, Jessie, daughter of John Proctor, chemist of Penzance, by whom he left four children, including the architect E. H. Sedding.

== Compositions ==
His chief musical compositions were:

1. A Collection of Nine Antient Christmas Carols for four voices, 1860 (6th edition 1864)
2. Jerusalem the Golden: a hymn, 1861
3. Seven Ancient Carols for four voices, 1863 (2nd edition 1864)
4. Five Hymns of ye Holy Eastern Church, 1864
5. Sun of my Soul: a hymn set to music in four parts, 1864
6. Litany of the Passion, 1865
7. The Harvest is the end of the World, 1865
8. Be we merry in this Feast: a carol, 1866
- He supplied 15 quarto pages of illustrations for F. G. Lee's Directorium Anglicanum (2nd edition 1865)

== Sources ==
- This article incorporates text from a publication now in the public domain: "Sedding, Edmund". Dictionary of National Biography. London: Smith, Elder & Co. 1885–1900.
