= Edmund Harold Sedding =

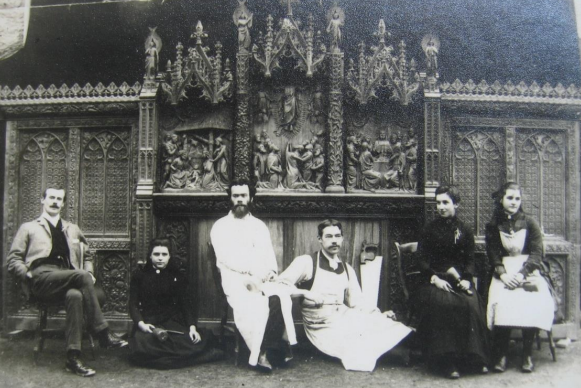
- Sedding, three Pinwill sisters and workers with Reredos of Chilthorne Domer church, Somerset.
- Born: 1863; Pimlico
- Died: 21 February 1921 (aged 57–58); London
- Burial place: Crantock Cornwall
- Occupation: Architect

Edmund Harold Sedding (1863 – 21 February 1921), often referred to as E. H. Sedding, was an English architect who practised in Devon and Cornwall.

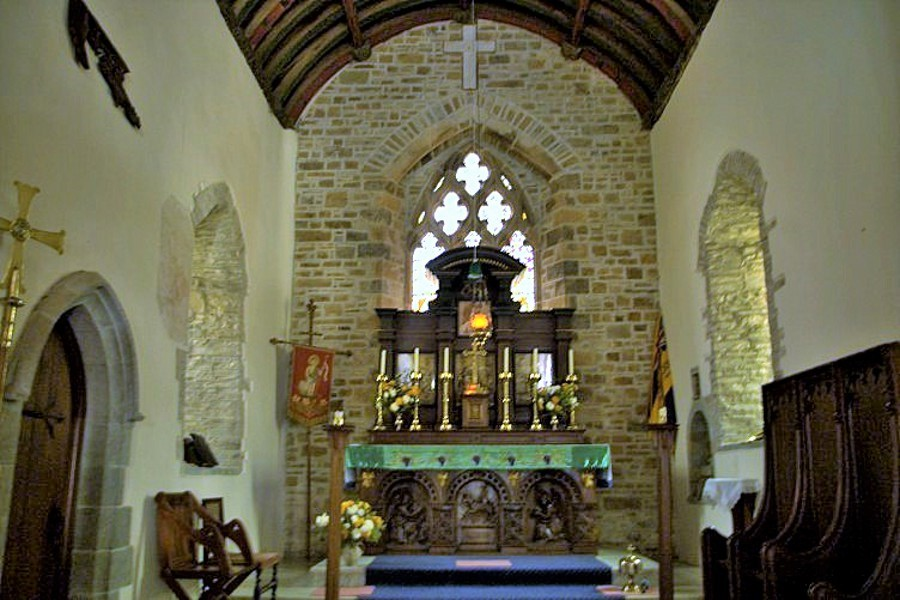
Sedding's design and Pinwill sisters' work in the chancel of the Church of St Morwenna and St John the Baptist, Morwenstow

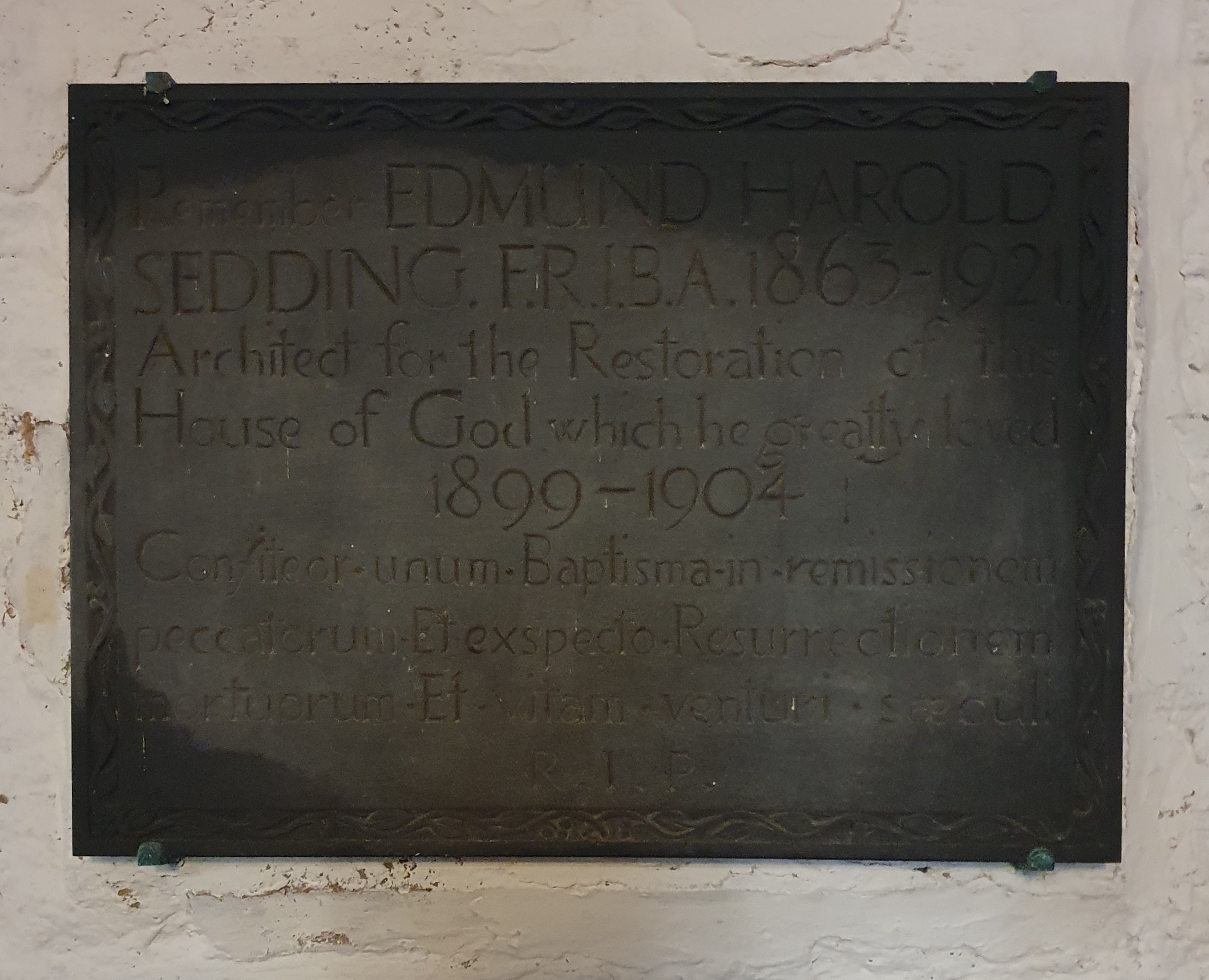

== Life ==
Sedding was born in 1863 in Pimlico, London, the son of Edmund Sedding and the nephew of J. D. Sedding. He was articled to his uncle, and initially employed by him, later setting up his own independent practice in Plymouth in 1891. His awards included the RA medal in 1884, the RIBA medal the following year, the RA Travelling Fellowship in 1886, and the Pugin medal in 1887. His published work includes Norman architecture in Cornwall (1909).

Sedding supported the Pinwill sisters to become important church woodcarvers in Devon and Cornwall. He came to know them during the restoration of the church of St Peter and St Paul in Ermington in Devon, where they carved the pulpit. He later commissioned the three sisters Mary, Ethel and Violet for a range of work in the two counties and through these commissions creating his designs they established a good reputation and were employed by other church architects as well.

Edmund Harold Sedding died in London on 21 February 1921 and is buried in the graveyard of St Carantoc Church, Crantock, Cornwall.

== Work ==
As the nephew and pupil of John Dando Sedding, Edmund undoubtedly benefited from the cachet of the Sedding name but went on to earn his place as a celebrated restorer of ancient churches in Devon and Cornwall. The commissions he received for restoration work far outnumbered those for new ecclesiastical buildings. The dozen or so buildings he designed consisted of a few churches, several chapels, a couple of church schools and the odd rectory and vicarage, together with the extraordinary commission for Dunedin Cathedral in New Zealand. The two Devon churches designed by Sedding are within a few miles of each other, the Church of St Peter, Shaldon and at Newton Abbot.

== Bibliography ==
- Norman Architecture In Cornwall – A Handbook To Old Cornish Ecclesiastical Architecture (1909)
