= Canvey Island Carcass =

Globster found in England in 1954

The Canvey Island Carcass is a carcass of an alleged "sea monster," or globster, that washed ashore on the Canvey Island, Essex, in southeastern England in 1954. It was later identified as a carcass of a fish from the Lophiiformes order of ray-finned fish.

== Description ==
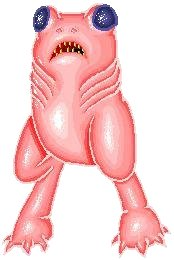
An artistic depiction of the carcass as a living being.

When the carcass was washed ashore on a beach at Canvey Island in 1954, an eyewitness described it as having bulging eyes, a wide mouth, and a flat body, with two legs on its belly that had five toes on each foot. A similarly described creature was reportedly discovered at the same place the previous year. As for its size, it was described as being two feet long, while its weight was measured to be twelve kilograms. The creature was reportedly also described as not being dangerous to humans.

== Theories and identification ==
When the carcass was first discovered in 1954, it was not identified and was dubbed the Canvey Island Monster, leading to some foreign interest in Canvey Island. Ufologist and radio presenter Frank Edwards, writing in the late 1950s, presented the carcass as being that of a cryptid which he claimed was responsible for the 1855 "Devil's Footprints" incident, adding in a description that the five toes could be compressed to form a U-shape, similar to the hooves of traditional depictions of Satan. However in 1999, journalist Nicholas Warren of Fate magazine, while researching on the 1954 incident, received a letter from former ichthyologist and museum curator Alwyne Cooper Wheeler who confirmed that the so-called "Canvey Island Monster" was a fish from the Lophiiformes order. Further research from Wheeler proved that the "creature" was nothing more than the carcass of either a dead monkfish or anglerfish, one that had been bloated and left for dead on the shore.

== See also ==
- Globster
