= Bloody Kids =

1980 television film

- Written by: Stephen Poliakoff
- Directed by: Stephen Frears
- Starring: Derrick O'Connor
- Music by: George Fenton
- Country of origin: United Kingdom
- Original language: English

Production
- Producer: Barry Hanson
- Running time: 91 minutes

Original release
- Release: 1979

Bloody Kids is a British television film written by Stephen Poliakoff and directed by Stephen Frears, made by Black Lion Films for ATV, and first shown on ITV on 22 March 1980.

== Cast ==
- Derrick O'Connor as Detective Ritchie (Richard Beckinsale originally cast before his sudden death)
- Gary Holton as Ken
- Richard Thomas as Leo Turner
- Peter Clark as Mike Simmonds
- Gwyneth Strong as Jan, Ken's Girlfriend
- Caroline Embling as Susan, Leo's Sister
- Jack Douglas as Senior Police Officer
- Billy Colvill as Williams
- P.H. Moriarty as Police 1
- Richard Hope as Police 2
- Niall Padden as Police 3
- John Mulcahy as Police 4
- Terry Paris as Police 5
- Neil Cunningham as School Master 1
- George Costigan as School Master 2
- Stewart Harwood as School's Security Guard
- Tammy Jacobs as School 1
- Daniel Peacock as School 2
- Paul Mari as School 3
- Mel Smith as Disco Doorman
- C.P. Lee as Club Manager
- Jimmy Hibbert as Disco 3
- Kim Taylforth as Disco 4
- Nula Conwell as Ken's Gang 1
- Madeline Church as Ken's Gang 2
- Peter Wilson as Ken's Gang 3
- Gary Olsen as Ken's Gang 4 (as Gary Olson)
- Jesse Birdsall as Ken's Gang 5
- Roger Lloyd-Pack as Hospital Doctor
- Brenda Fricker as Nurse
- June Watson as Nurse
- Colin Campbell as Conductor
- Julian Hough as Reporter
- Geraldine James as Ritchie's Wife
- Pauline Walker - posh bird and dancing extra

== Filming locations ==
Filmed in south east Essex, with locations in Southend-on-Sea, Westcliff, Leigh-on-Sea and Canvey Island, the opening five minutes are of the bridge down to Leigh-on-Sea's cockle sheds, with a lorry hanging over.

Furtherwick Park School Canvey Island, was used for the school scenes, and Southend United's ground, Roots Hall, was used for the stabbing scenes.

Disco scenes in Southend are notable for an early television appearance of Mel Smith playing the bouncer. Victoria Circus, Southend seafront and hospital are all used as locations, culminating in a climactic scene outside the Casino, Canvey Island, on a London double decker bus.
