= Canvey Island =

Town and island in Essex, England

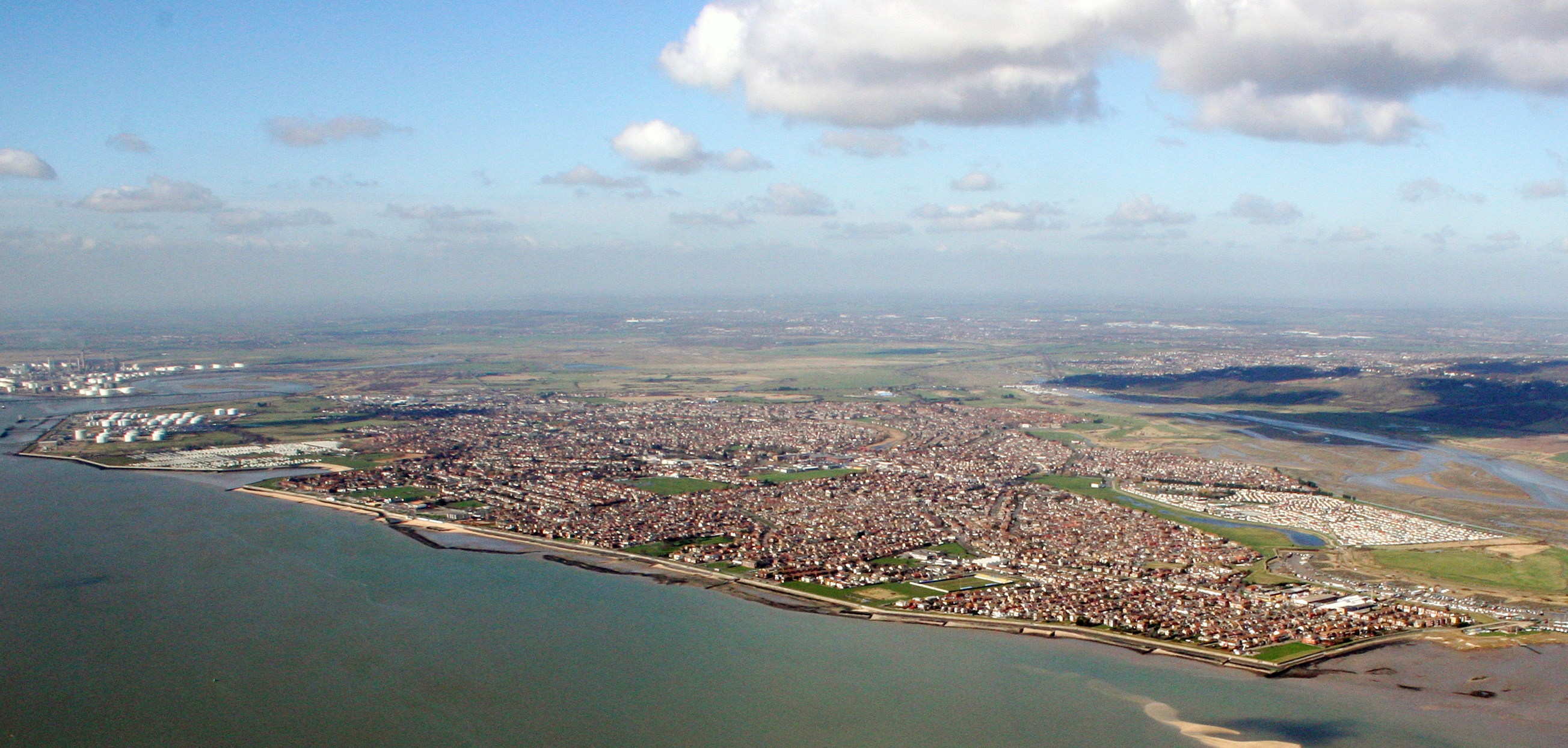
- Aerial view from the south east of Canvey Island

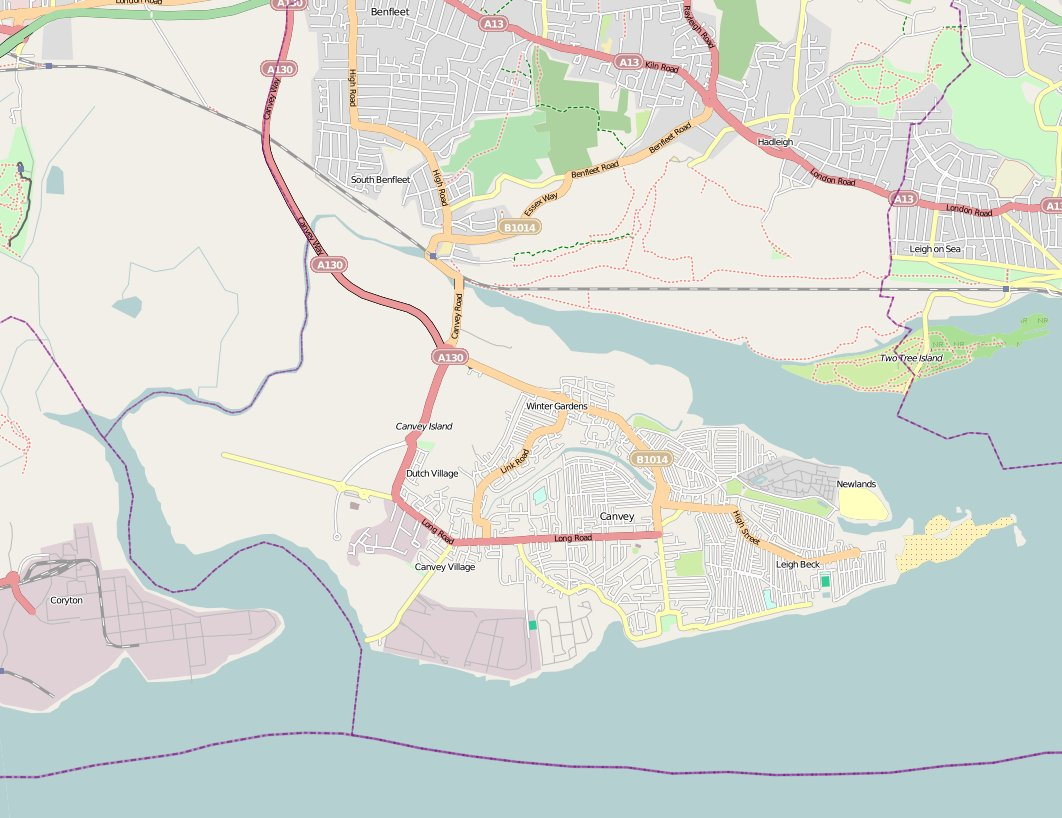
- Canvey Island and the surrounding environment

- Location within Essex
- Population: 38,327 (Parish, 2021); 38,010 (Built up area, 2021)
- OS grid reference: TQ7882
- Civil parish: Canvey Island
- District: Castle Point
- Shire county: Essex
- Region: East
- Country: England
- Sovereign state: United Kingdom
- Post town: CANVEY ISLAND
- Postcode district: SS8
- Dialling code: 01268; 01374
- Police: Essex
- Fire: Essex
- Ambulance: East of England
- UK Parliament: Castle Point
- Website: www.canveyisland-tc.gov.uk

Canvey Island is a town, civil parish and island in the Thames Estuary. It forms part of the Castle Point district of Essex, England. It is separated from the mainland of south Essex by a network of creeks, but is connected to the mainland by bridges. It has an area of 7.12 square miles (18.44 km^{2}). At the 2021 census the parish had a population of 38,327 and the built up area had a population of 38,010.

Lying below sea level, it is prone to flooding at exceptional tides. It has been inhabited since the Roman conquest of Britain. The island was mainly agricultural land until the 20th century, when it became the fastest-growing seaside resort in Britain between 1911 and 1951. The North Sea flood of 1953 devastated the island, killing 58 islanders and leading to the temporary evacuation of the 13,000 residents. Canvey is consequently protected by modern sea defences comprising 2 miles (3.2 km) of concrete sea walls.

Canvey Island is also notable for its relationship to the petrochemical industry. The island was the site of the first delivery in the world of liquefied natural gas by ship and later became the subject of an influential assessment on the risks to a population living within the vicinity of petrochemical shipping and storage facilities.

== History ==
=== Roman ===
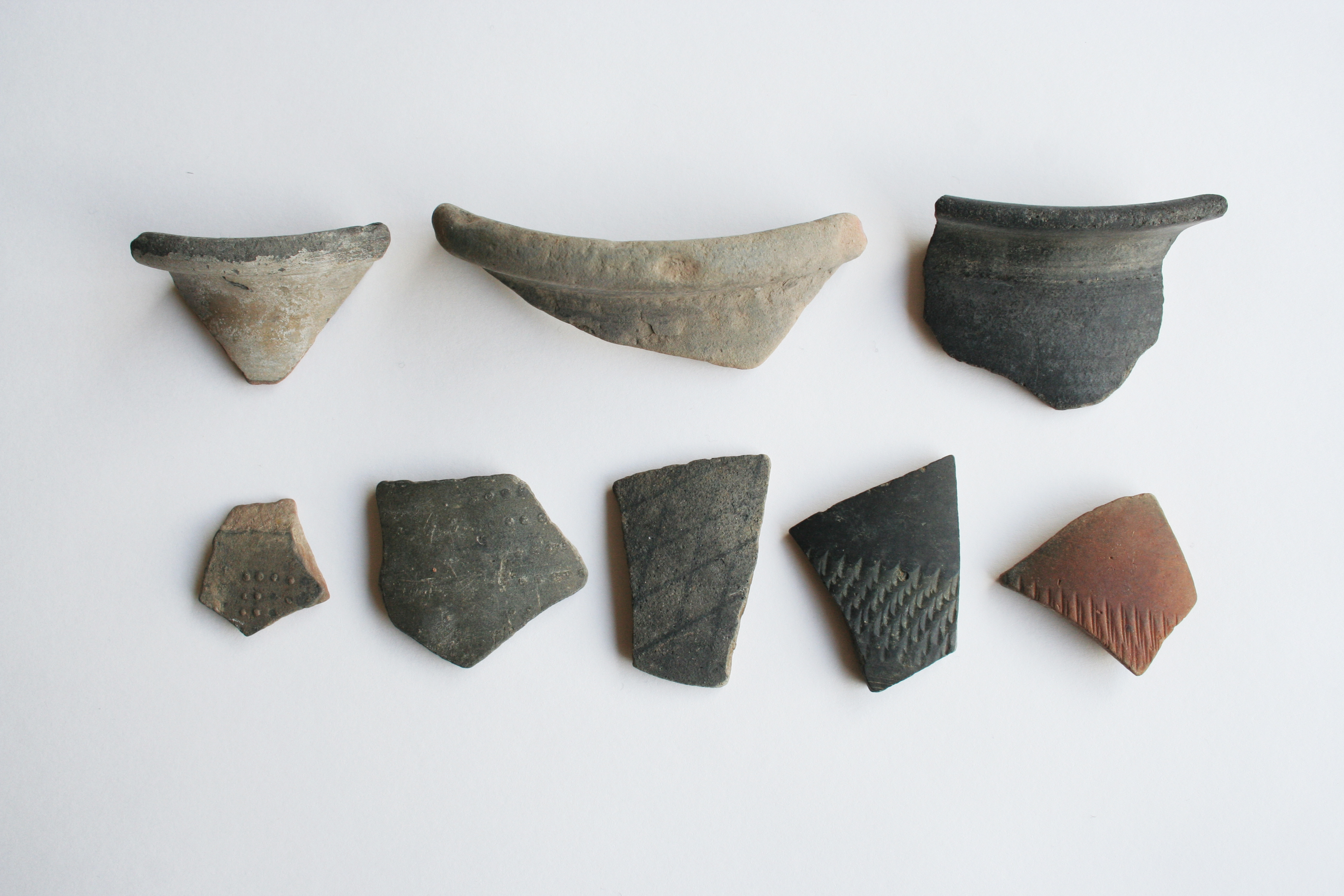
Fragments of early marked pottery uncovered from Canvey Point.

Excavations on Canvey have unearthed a collection of early man-made objects comprising axes from the Neolithic era, a bracelet dating from the Bronze Age, and Iron Age pottery. However, the remains of Roman structures and objects suggests the first settlement of Canvey occurred between AD 50 and 250. The remains point to a community existing with a farmstead, a garrison, a burial ground, and the operation of a large salt-making industry (revealed by the existence of several red hills).

The discovery of a Roman road found to terminate 109 yards (100 m) across the creek in neighbouring Benfleet suggests a means may have existed to facilitate the salt's distribution to Chelmsford and Colchester, and the recovery of rich items of pottery and glassware of a variety only matched elsewhere by excavations of port facilities suggests the Romans may also have exploited Canvey's location in the Thames for shipping.

==== 'Counus Island' ====
In 1607 the Elizabethan antiquarian William Camden noted in his work Britannia (a topographical and historical survey of all of Great Britain and Ireland) that Canvey Island (which he called Island Convennon) was documented in the 2nd century by the Alexandrian geographer Ptolemy. In his work Geographia, Ptolemy mentions a headland in the mouth of the Thames to the east of the Trinovantes region called Counus Island. However, the difficulties faced in determining the location of land areas in Ptolemy's ancient work have led modern researchers to question the correlation between Ptolemy's island and contemporary Canvey. MacBean and Johnson, 18th-century historians, contend that Counus Island would have existed much further out to sea (or may even have been the Isle of Sheppey), so any similarity between the names is mere coincidence. Without any suitable island matching Ptolemy's Counus Island, 20th-century historians White and Yearsley posit the documented island to have been lost or reduced to an insignificant sandbank by subsidence and the constant effects of the sea.

=== Saxon and medieval ===
The settlement and agricultural development of Essex by the Saxons from the 5th century saw the introduction of sheep farming, which would dominate the island's industry until the 20th century. After the Norman conquest the area of Canvey was recorded in the Domesday Book as a sheep-farming pasture under the control of nine parishes across south inland and coastal Essex; some of these parishes were on the adjacent mainland, but others were as far afield as Laindon and Prittlewell. Apart from the meat and wool produced from the sheep, the milk from the ewes was used for cheese-making. The abundance in later centuries would see the cheeses become a commodity taken for sale at the London markets, and at one stage exported via Calais to the continent.

The existence of several place names on modern Canvey using the wick suffix (denoting the sheds in which the cheese was made) shows the influence of the early Saxon culture. Historian Ian Yearsley states that the name of the island is derived from the Anglo-Saxon Caningaege, meaning "the Island of Cana's People". Developments in the English language yielded the more familiar form Caneveye found in manorial records of 1254. The period of transition from Old to Early Middle English often give rise to confusions of orthography, leading, in this instance, to such variant spellings as Canefe, Kaneweye, Kaneveye and Koneveye. By the 12th century, Essex and subsequently Canvey were in the possession of Henry de Essex who inherited the land from his grandfather, Swein, son of Robert fitz Wymarch. During the reign of Henry II (1154–1189) the land was confiscated from de Essex and redistributed among the King's favoured nobles.

=== 14th century – 17th century ===
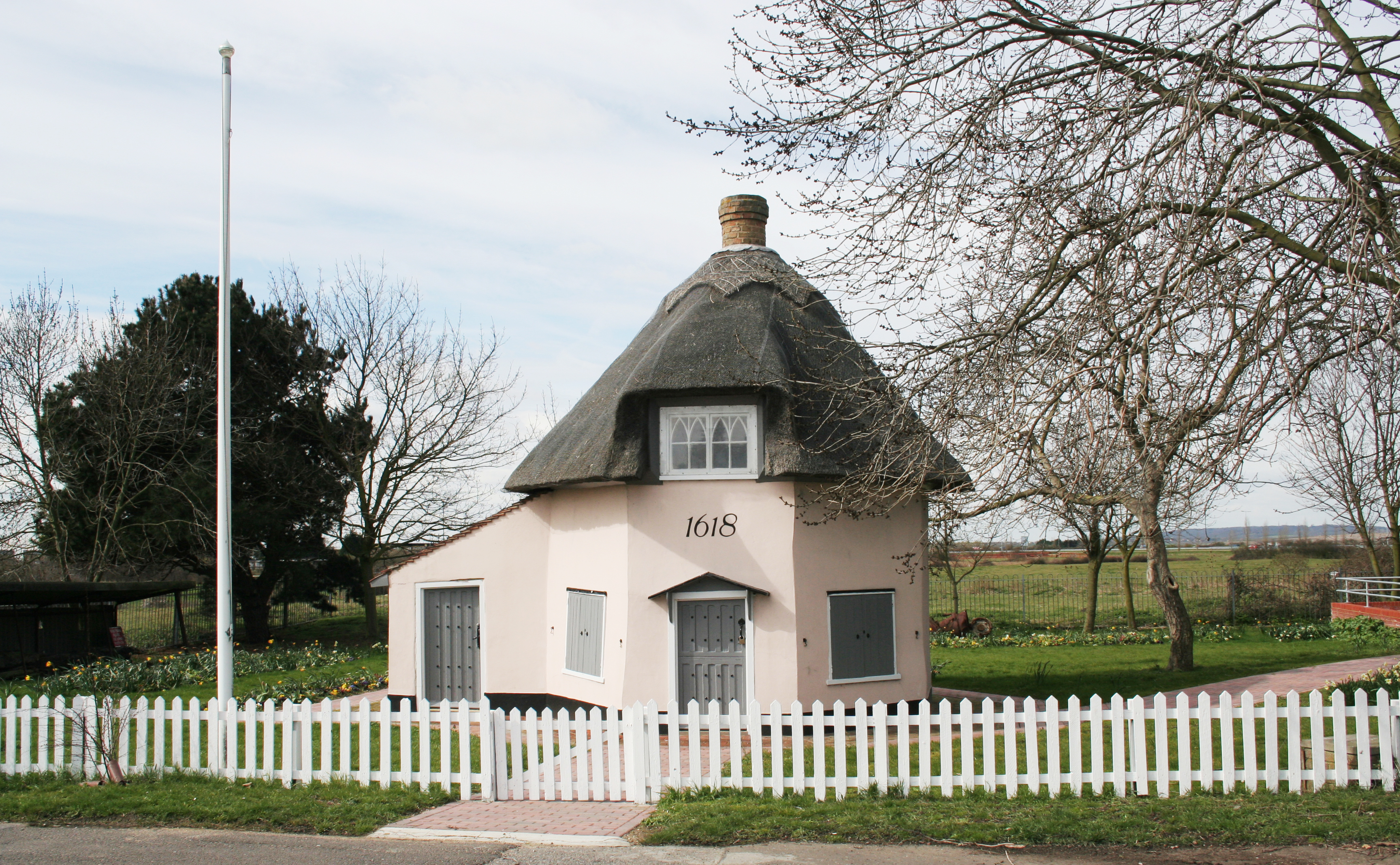
One of two octagonal Dutch cottages from the 17th century which are preserved on the island. The above cottage now functions as a museum.

During Edward II's reign (1307–1327) the land was under the possession of John de Apeton and the first attempts were made at managing the effects of the sea with rudimentary defences, but periodical flooding continued to blight the small population of mostly shepherds and their fat-tailed variety of sheep for a further 300 years. William Camden wrote of the island in 1607 that it was so low that it was often quite flooded, except the hills, upon which the sheep had a place of safe refuge. The uniform flatness of Canvey suggests that these hills are likely to be the red hills of the Roman saltmaking industry, or the early makeshift sea defences constructed by some of the landowners around their farms.

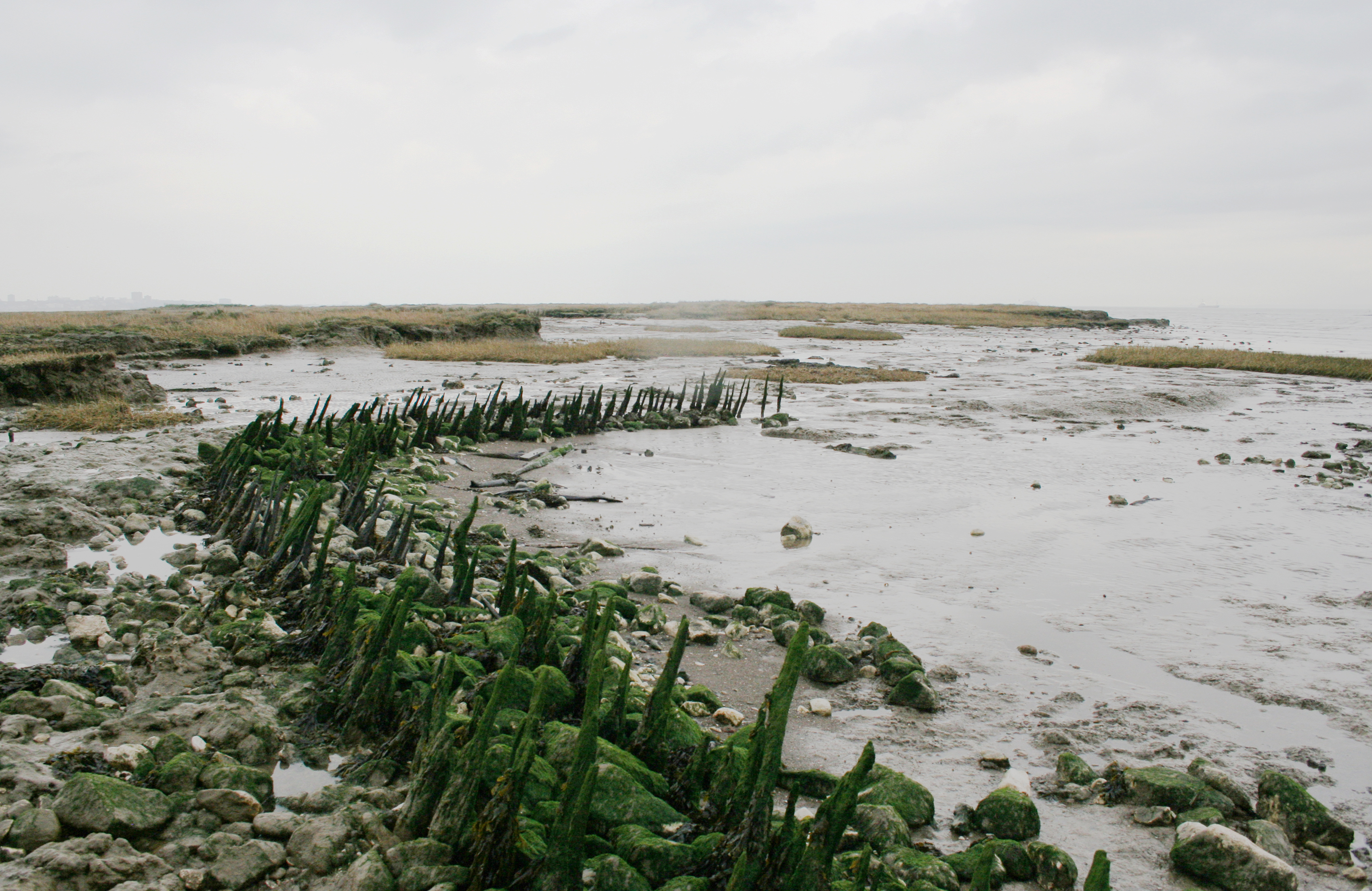
A timber channel, and chalk and ragstone remains of the sea wall built c. 1622.

In 1622, Sir Henry Appleton (a descendant of John de Apeton) and Canvey's other landowners instigated a project to reclaim the land and wall the island from the Thames. The scheme was managed by an acquaintance of Appleton's – Joas Croppenburg, a Dutch haberdasher of Cheapside in London. An agreement reached in 1623 stipulated that in return for inning and recovering the island, the landowners would grant a third of the land as payment for the work.

The presence of the Dutch engineer Cornelius Vermuyden, a relation of Croppenburg's, in England at the time of the project on a commission to drain the Fens and involved in repairing the seawall at Dagenham, has led to speculation that Vermuyden oversaw the project, but proof appears to be vague; nevertheless, the work was completed by around 300 Dutch workers skilled in the construction of dykes and other sea defences. The engineers successfully reclaimed 3,600 acres (15 km^{2}) by walling the island with local chalk, limestone and the heavy clay of the marshes, with the main length along the Thames faced with Kentish ragstone.

A broad drainage ditch was dug inland off the area facing the river while smaller inlets were filled in. Excess water would have collected in the broad ditch and then been discharged into the river by the means of seven sluices (later known as Commissioners Dykes). The completion of the work saw a considerable number of the Dutch engineers take land as payment for their work, and consequently settle on the island.

=== Modern era ===
==== Chapman Lighthouse ====
The Chapman Lighthouse, briefly described in Joseph Conrad's novel Heart of Darkness, was on the coast of Canvey Island. It is believed that the peril of the mudflats below such shallow waters off the Canvey Island coast prompted the Romans to devise some form of beacon as a warning in the area. In 1851 a hexagonal lighthouse was constructed by the engineer James Walker, a consultant lighthouse engineer at Trinity House at the time. This all-iron lighthouse replaced a lightship which had been moored in the area for the preceding four years. The lighthouse was demolished in 1957–1958 because of its poor condition.

==== Bare-knuckle boxing ====
The Lobster Smack Inn saw many bare-knuckle fights in the 1850s. Sometimes the bouts were between local families, the best known being that between champion Ben Caunt and Nat Langham. The fight arose from a family feud and Caunt took Langham to 60 rounds in September 1853. Langham was knocked down 59 times during the bout and because, it is said, of his sportsmanship Caunt agreed to settle their differences with a handshake.

==== Preventive service ====
Historian Philip Benton reported about Canvey Chapel in 1867: "The seats are open and unappropriated, except one, which is set apart for the officer and the men under him of the Preventive Service; there being a station on the island for nine men, an officer and a chief boatman." The Preventive Men had their own special row of cottages close to the seafront near the old Lobster Smack Inn. That ancient pub was itself described by Charles Dickens in Great Expectations. So out of the way (and therefore the haunt of smugglers) was the inn behind the sea wall, in the 18th century it was known as 'The World's End'. In the 19th century, the isolation made it an ideal point for the meetings of pugilists. The row of Preventive Men's Cottages has survived against the odds. Today they are surrounded by a small housing estate.

==== Seaside resort ====
During the Victorian era Canvey became a very fashionable place to visit, and its air was promoted as having healing properties. This started in 1899, after the Black Monday floods, when an entrepreneur called Frederick Hester bought Leigh Beck Farm, and started what was to be called Southview Park estate. The properties sold very quickly so Frederick bought more plots of land, selling them as dream homes for London's Eastenders. Hester wanted to create Canvey as a great seaside resort for Londoners, and so built the first promenade, a pier and a magnificent winter garden and palace, which he planned to cover six miles (but only covered a mile), as well as a monorail system (initially horse-drawn then later electric). Hester marketed Canvey as "Ye Old Dutch Island", giving many of the new roads Dutch-sounding names and enticing potential buyers with free rail tickets. The project started well with thousands of plots sold, but by 1905 had fallen apart due to materials not being delivered and issues with land ownership with the laying of the monorail. Hester was declared bankrupt and everything was sold off at an auction held at Chimney's Farm.

A new seafront was developed in the 1930s, with Canvey Casino – an amusement arcade and park – opening as the first building on what would become Eastern Esplanade.

==== Second World War ====
During the Second World War the island was a part of the GHQ Line, a line of 11 concrete pillboxes constructed as a part of the defence against the expected German invasion. Only one of the old pillboxes still can be seen, just off Haven Road, with the others believed to have been buried in the sea wall development of the 1970s. Also, concrete barges were used extensively just off the south coast of the island, partly as a sea-barrier and also as a mounting point for anti-aircraft guns. A concrete barge which had been beached on the east end of the island, remaining for many years as a point of interest for visitors and a play area for many generations of the island's children, was however not part of these defences and had been brought there by the Island Yacht Club, who have since demolished it as it was considered dangerous.

Along with the Coalhouse Fort at nearby East Tilbury, Thorney Bay on the southern coast of the island was the site of a degaussing station built to monitor the effectiveness of the equipment on board the allied ships passing along the Thames. The structure is the last intact degaussing station on the north side of the river, and was still operating in 1974. Known as the Canvey loop, the building was occupied by the Women's Royal Naval Service and used for monitoring merchant ships. The building has since been re-opened as a museum dubbed the "Bay Museum" and has First World War exhibits on the ground floor and Second World War exhibits on the first floor.

An anti-aircraft battery was located at Little Gypps, called "TN7 Furtherwick" with had six gun emplacements. The site, known as the Gunny by locals, was designated a scheduled monument in January 2001.

The Commonwealth War Graves Commission records four civilian residents of Canvey Island Urban District died as a result of enemy action during the war.

==== Floods of 1953 ====
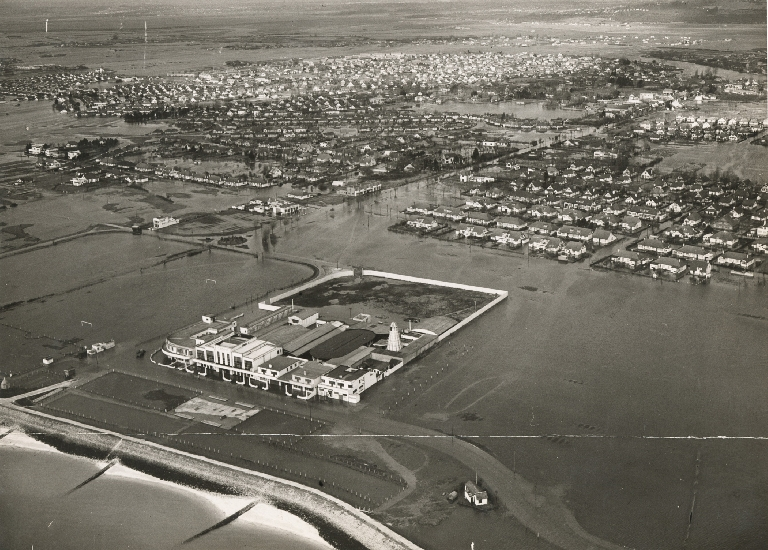
The flooded sea front, amusements and residential areas in 1953

On 1 February 1953, the infamous North Sea Flood hit the island during the night and caused the deaths of 58 people. Many of the victims were in the holiday bungalows of the eastern Newlands estate and perished as the water reached ceiling level.

The small village area of the island is approximately two feet (60 cm) above sea level and consequently escaped the effects of the flood. This included the Red Cow pub, which was later renamed the King Canute in reference to the legend of the 11th-century Danish king of England commanding the tide to halt with the sea lapping at his feet. The King Canute pub was closed in May 2014. In 2016 a scheme to convert the building into retail space and apartments was proposed.

After the flooding of 1953, a new seawall was built, which was then replaced with a significantly larger construction in the 1970s and 1980s, which was formerly opened by Princess Margaret in April 1984.

==== Petrochemical industry ====
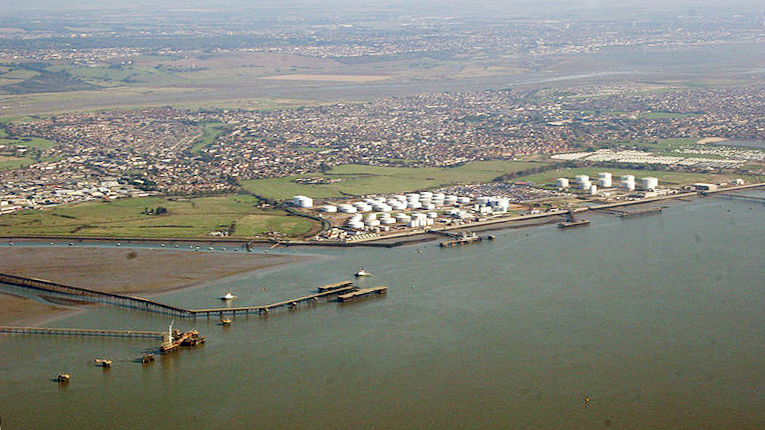
The petrochemical shipping and storage facilities at Hole Haven

The southern area of the Canvey Island West ward at Hole Haven has predominantly existed as petrochemical site since the first construction of an oil terminal there in 1936. In 1959, as part of a pioneering Anglo-American project designed to assess the viability of transporting liquefied natural gas overseas, a gas terminal with two 1000-tonne storage tanks was constructed at the site alongside the oil terminal. The gas terminal built by the British Gas Council was designed to store and distribute imported gas to the whole of Britain via the facilities at Thames Haven and the local refinery at Shellhaven in Coryton. The first delivery of 2,020 tonnes arrived on 20 February 1959 from Lake Charles, Louisiana, by a specially modified liberty ship Normarti renamed the Methane Pioneer. The success of seven further deliveries over the following 14 months established the international industry for transporting liquefied natural gas (LNG) by sea, but the discovery of oil and gas in North Sea limited further British development. Canvey continued to receive 50 shipments of LNG per year from Arzew Algeria in the Methane Princess and the Methane Progress, until about 1982, British Gas closed the site in 1994.

In 1964 the Italian company Agip Ltd were given an industrial development certificate to build a £15 million oil refinery in the north west of the island. The refinery was never built.

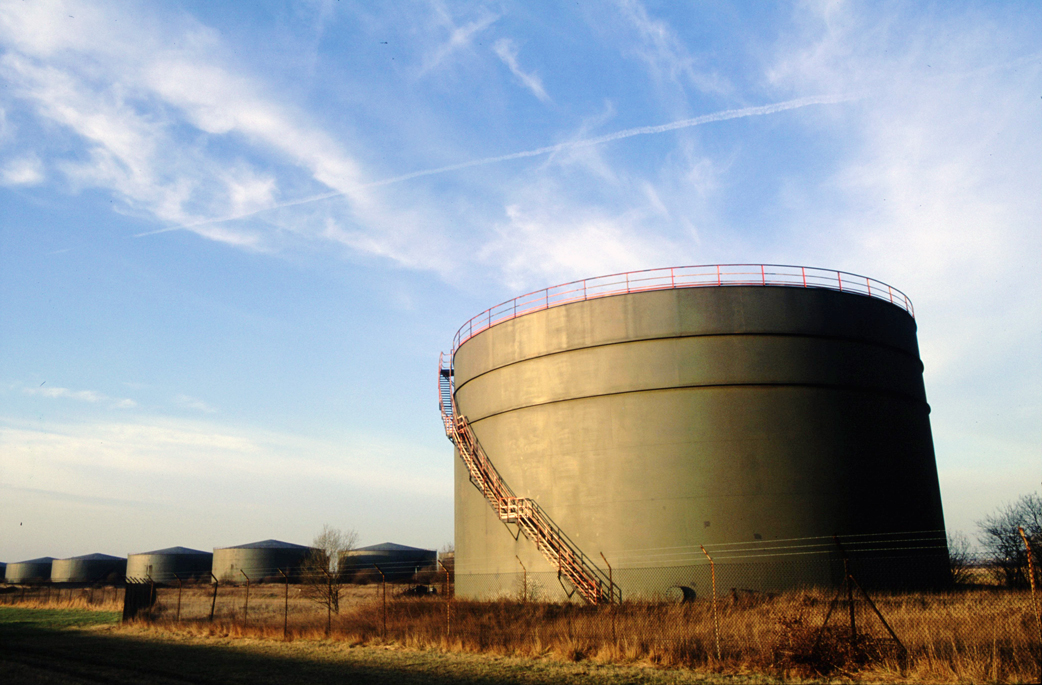
The disused storage tanks at the Occidental site in 1997.

In 1972 Occidental Petroleum began construction of an oil refinery. Access roads, about 20 oil-storage tanks, a river jetty and a concrete chimney were constructed, but work was halted in 1975 pending a major design study review following the oil crisis of 1973–4 and OPEC's increase of oil prices.

On 28 March 1973 planning permission was granted to United Refineries Ltd to develop a site to the north of the Occidental refinery site for the construction of another oil refinery. An exploratory public inquiry was held in February/March 1975 into the possible revocation of the planning permission for the United Refineries development. The report of 30 April 1975 recommended revocation and further expert evaluation of the totality of risks facing people who lived in and around Canvey. In March 1976 the Secretaries of State for the Environment and Employment asked the Health and Safety Commission to investigate the risks to health and safety of various installations on Canvey and the neighbouring part of Thurrock. The Commission invited the Health and Safety Executive (HSE) to carry out an investigation.

From the Canvey Report (1978) the following hazardous installations were identified:

Hazardous installations and activities at Canvey 1978
Company	Installation	Storage	Employees	Import	Export
British Gas Corporation	Liquified Natural Gas (LNG) Terminal	Liquified Natural Gas: 6 × 4,000 tonne above-ground tanks, 2 × 1,000 tonne above-ground tanks, 4 × 20,000 tonne in-ground tanks. Liquid Butane: 1 × 10,000 tonne tank, 2 × 5,000 tonne tanks	200	Sea	Pipeline & road
Texaco Ltd	Petroleum products storage	Petroleum products more than 80,000 tonne total capacity	130	Sea	Pipeline, road, sea
London & Coastal Wharves Ltd	Flammable and toxic liquids storage	Flammable and toxic liquids more than 300,000 tonne	50	Mainly sea but some road	Pipeline, road, some sea
Occidental Refineries Ltd	Oil refinery (proposed)	Liquified petroleum gases: 2 × 750 tonne propane spheres, 2 × 400 tonne butane spheres. Hydrocarbon liquids in about 50 tanks totalling about 125,000 cubic metres. Process and storage of 10–20 tonnes of hydrogen fluoride		Sea	Pipeline, road, sea
United Refineries Ltd	Oil refinery (proposed)	Liquified petroleum gases: 4 x 200 tonne propane spheres, 3 x 900 tonne butane spheres. Hydrocarbon liquids in about 50 tanks totalling about 125,000 cubic metres.		Sea	Pipeline, road, sea

In 1978 the HSE concluded that the residents of the island faced a risk more than five times higher than those in neighbouring South Benfleet.

Upper limit of average individual risk (expressed in chances in 10,000 a year)
	Canvey Island	South Benfleet
Existing installations	5.3	1.0
Existing + Improvements (in report)	2.7	0.4
Existing + Improvements + Additional measures	1.4	0.4
Existing + Developments + Improvements	3.4	0.4
Existing + Developments + Improvements + Additional measures	1.4	0.4

On 27 July 1978 Castle Point District Council asked the Secretary of State "to revoke the planning permission granted to United Refineries Ltd in accordance with his Inspector's recommendation at the exploratory inquiry in 1975".

The issue of risk was again highlighted in an attack by the IRA in January 1979 on a storage tank at the island's Texaco oil terminal. A bomb was detonated at a tank containing aviation fuel, but failed to ignite with the fuel escaping into a safety moat. The Occidental site was abandoned in 1975 leaving a half-built oil refinery, storage tanks, and an unused mile-long jetty that cost around £10 million of the approximate total of £60 million spent on the project. However, in the following years the disused and undisturbed site flourished as a haven for wildlife, and in 2003, the final storage tanks were removed in a clean-up operation, and the site was renamed as Canvey Wick and opened as a nature reserve.

In September 1997, the celebrity steeplejack Fred Dibnah was hired by Safeway supermarkets to demolish the unused 450-foot (140 m) concrete chimney that was part of the abandoned oil refinery. Safeway had planned for the 2,500-ton chimney to be demolished on 18 September in front of a large crowd of invited guests. This would have been the first time Dibnah's demolition technique of pit props and fire (without explosives) had been attempted on a concrete chimney and it was also the tallest chimney he had ever attempted to fell. However the chimney unexpectedly collapsed the previous day whilst Dibnah and his team were making the final preparations for the controlled demolition; no-one was injured by the collapse. The incident is described in detail in various biographies and by Dibnah himself in his public speaking events afterwards. Dibnah later presented Safeway head office staff with brass paperweights (made from material salvaged from the chimney) stamped "The Great Canvey Island Chimney Disaster 1997".

===== The sites today =====
Calor Gas Ltd now operate the former British Gas site. The site imports, stores, bottles and exports liquified petroleum gases (LPG), propane and butane. There were plans in 2005–7 to convert the plant back to the import of liquified natural gas (LNG) but the planning application was rejected.

Oikos Storage Limited now operate the former London & Coastal Wharves Ltd. The site offers a bulk liquid storage facility for refined petroleum products.

Neither of the refineries proposed in the 1970s were completed or commissioned. The Occidental site was demolished and the tanks removed, though the former river jetty is still extant, and was nominated for the Design Museum's "Lesser Known Architecture" display in 2013.

== Geography ==
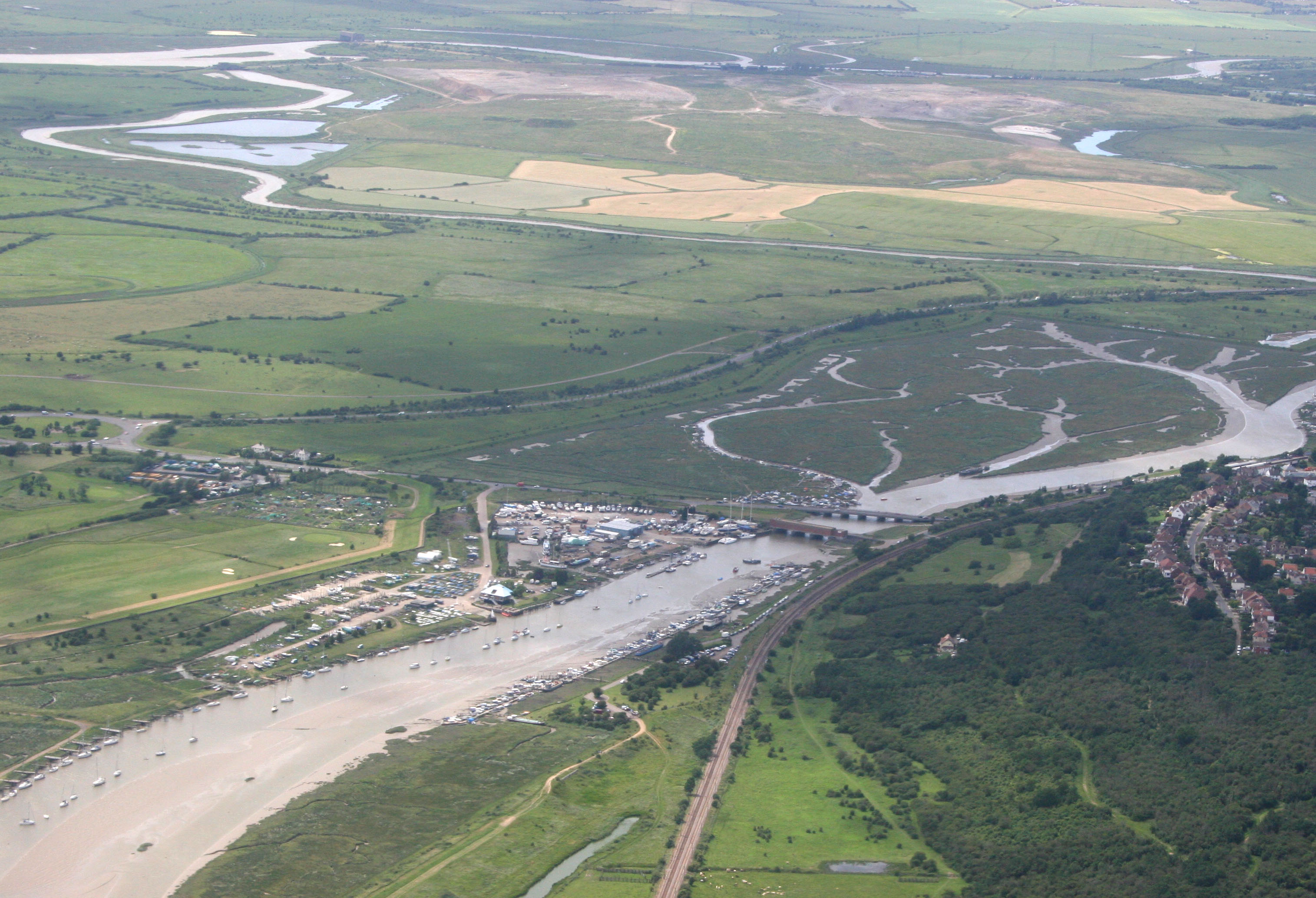
Canvey Island from the east; showing the flood barrier and bridge at Benfleet Creek.

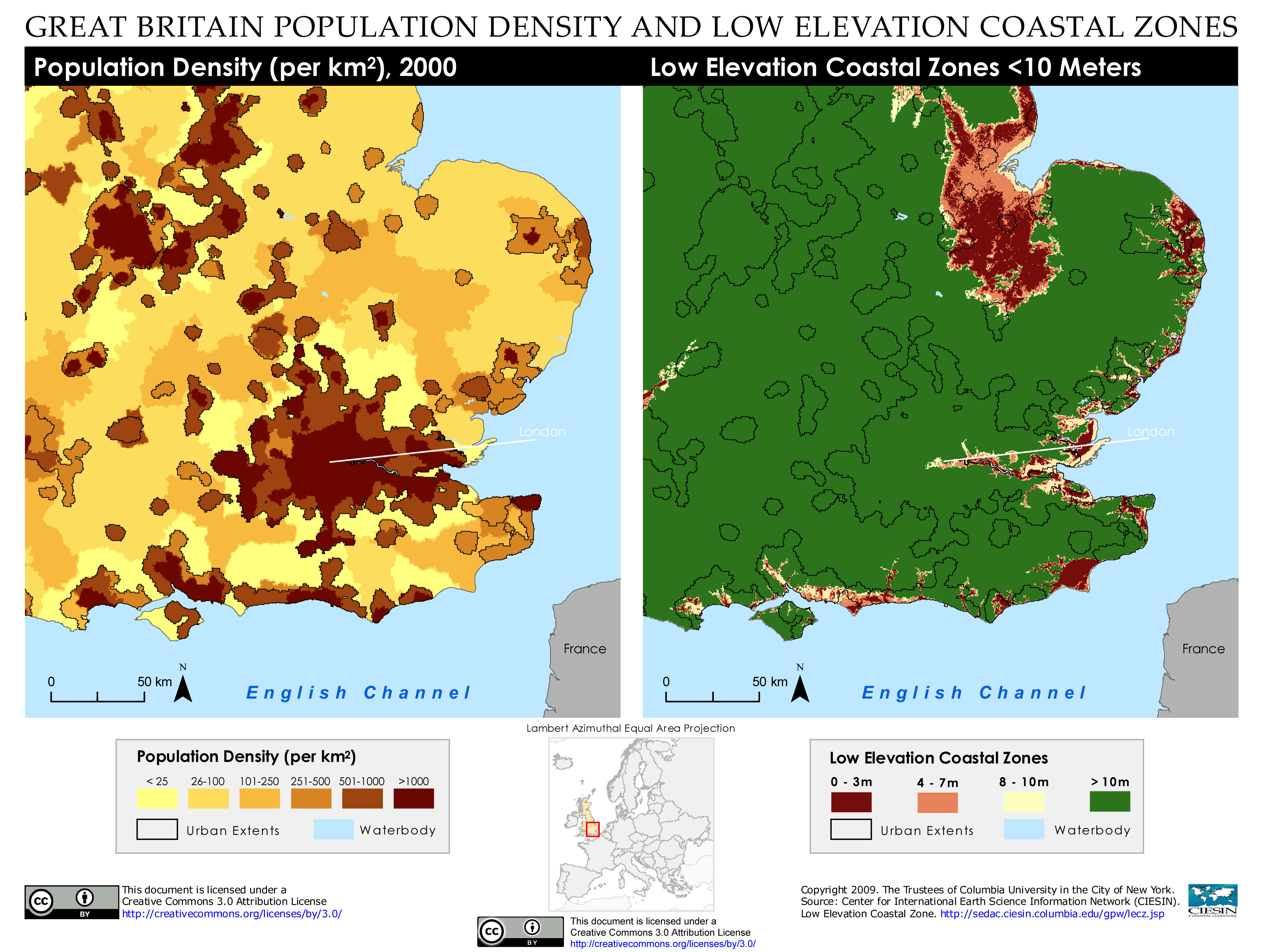
South-east England: population density and low elevation coastal zones. Canvey Island is particularly vulnerable to sea level rise.

Canvey Island lies off the south coast of Essex 30 miles (48 km) east of London, and 15 miles (24 km) west of Southend-on-Sea. The island is separated from the mainland to the north and west by Benfleet, East Haven and Vange creeks, and faces the Thames Estuary to the east and south. Along with neighbouring Two Tree Island, Lower Horse and Upper Horse, Canvey is an alluvial island formed in the Holocene period from silt in the River Thames and material entering the estuary on the tides of the North Sea from the coast of Norfolk. An unsuccessful search for coal beneath the island in 1953 revealed that the alluvium rests upon layers of London Clay, Lower London Tertiaries, Chalk, Lower Greensand and Gault Clay, with the basement rocks at a depth of 1,300 feet (400 m) consisting of hard Old Red Sandstone of Devonian age.

The island is extremely flat, lying 10 feet (3 m) below mean high water level and consequently is at risk of flooding. Before reclamation, the surrounding area contained a number of islands separated by tidal creeks. Flood defences have been constructed since the Middle Ages, and the first sea wall to completely surround the island was built as part of the island's reclamation in 1622. The island suffered extensive flooding in 1731, 1736, 1791, 1881 and 1897, and substantial loss of life in the North Sea Flood of 1953.

The extensive sea wall, completed in 1982, is 15 miles (24 km) long and surrounds 75% of the island's perimeter terminating with flood barriers spanning Benfleet Creek to the north and East Haven Creek in the west. The drainage system consists of sewers, culverts, natural and artificial dykes and lakes which feed seven pumping stations and gravity sluices that discharge the water into the Thames and creeks. Four of the discharge sites are "high flow" stations capable of discharging 600 litres of water per second at any tide level. The levels within the system are managed by a further five "low flow" pumping stations. Canvey according to DEFRA has a 0.1% or greater chance of flooding each year without the existing flood defences, with the Island being flooded in 2013 and 2014. The Environment Agency's Thames Estuary 2100 flood defence plan includes Canvey Island as one site for alleviating the flood risks to London and the Thames estuary area. It is proposed that the western side of Canvey is developed as a site which is either temporarily flooded at times of risk, or transformed into a permanent wetland.

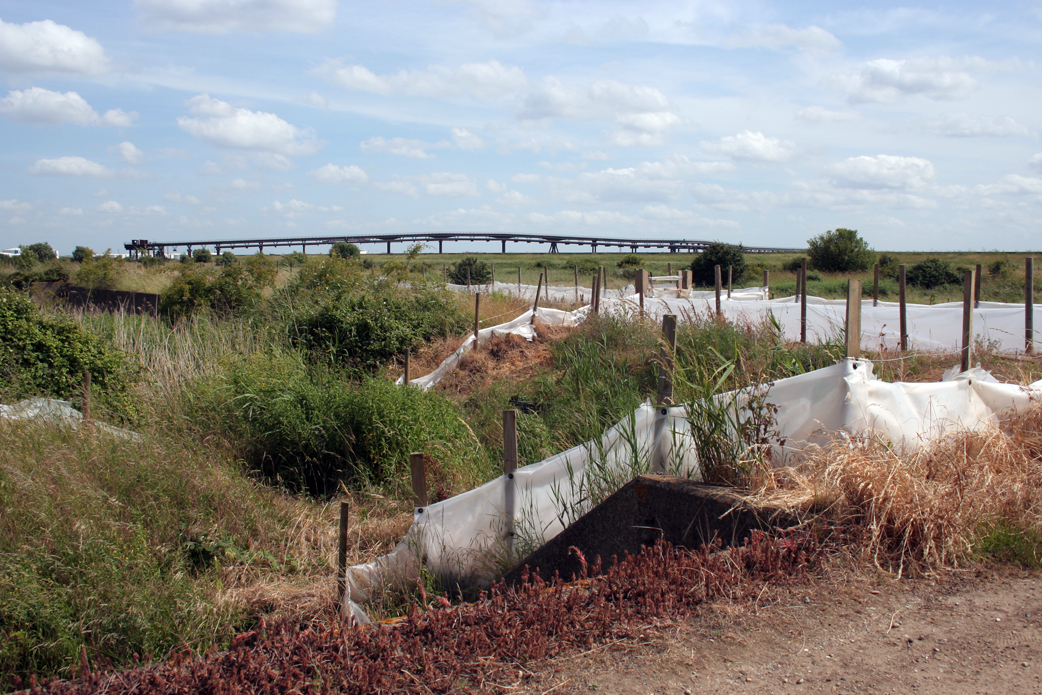
The disused Occidental jetty, and reed beds of Canvey Wick.

Developments in the 20th century have produced a marked contrast between the environments in the east and west of the island. The eastern half of the island is allocated to residential areas, the main public amenities and a small holiday camp and seafront, while the western half of the island is mainly farmland, marshes and industrial areas. The marshes in the west include the 30 hectares known as West Canvey marshes, acquired by the RSPB in 2007, and the Canvey Wick nature reserve. Canvey Wick is a designated Site of Special Scientific Interest (SSSI) at the site of the abandoned and incomplete oil refinery. The foundations of the 100-hectare (0.4 sq mile) site were prepared in the 1970s by laying thousands of tonnes of silt dredged from the Thames; the abandoned and undisturbed area has flourished as a haven for around 1,300 species of wildlife, some of which are endangered or were thought to be extinct in the UK, including the Shrill carder bee, the Beewolf wasp and the Bombardier beetle.

It has been said that the site may have one of the highest levels of biodiversity in Western Europe. Other areas of natural interest include the 20 acres (8 ha) of Canvey Lake Local Nature Reserve owned by Castle Point Borough Council. The lake was used for salt-making during the Roman settlement of the island, and is also thought to have functioned as an oyster bed. At the eastern point of the island is the 36-acre (150,000 m^{2}) Canvey Heights Country Park which was reclaimed from the Newlands landfill site that operated there between 1954 and 1989. The park is the highest land on the island and thus has wide views across the creeks and marshes and along the Thames. The environment supports an array of birds including skylarks, dark-bellied brent geese and grey plover.

== Governance ==
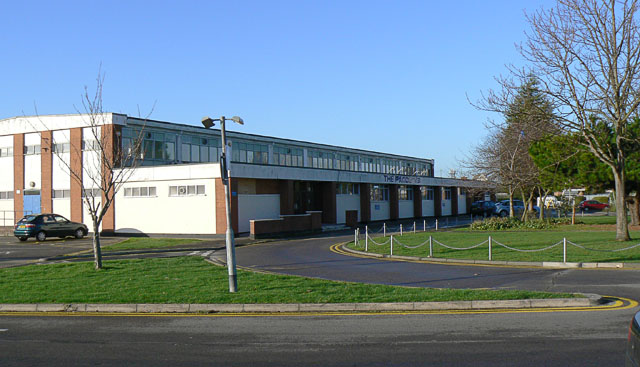
The Paddocks Community Centre

There are three tiers of local government covering Canvey Island, at parish (town), district, and county level: Canvey Island Town Council, Castle Point Borough Council, and Essex County Council. The town council is based at the Paddocks, a community centre on Long Road.

Since the 2024 local elections, all fifteen of the island's councillors on Castle Point Borough Council belong to the Canvey Island Independent Party (CIIP), formed in 2003 by ex-Labour deputy council leader and local resident Dave Blackwell.

For national elections, the island forms part of the Castle Point constituency.

=== Administrative history ===
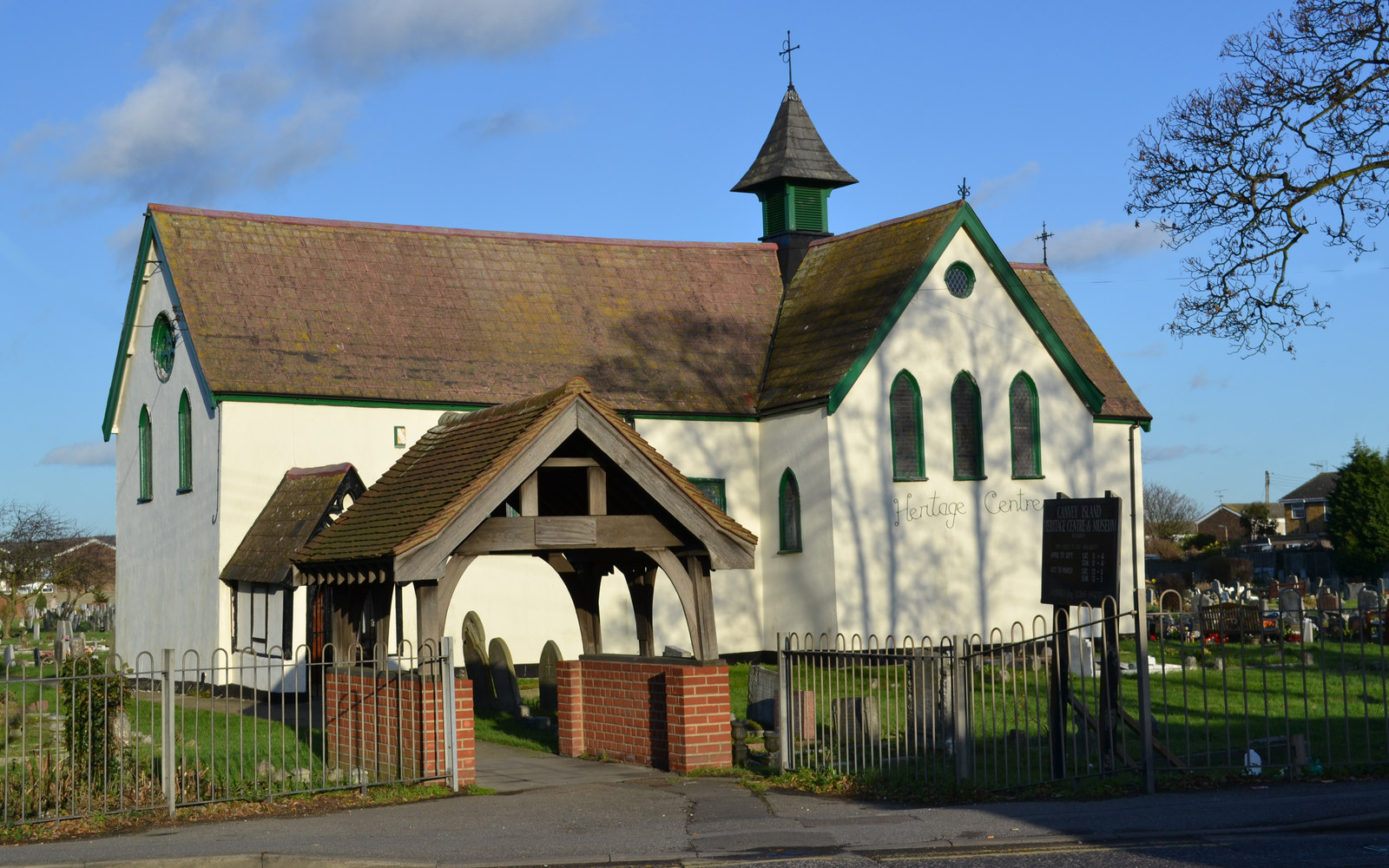
Heritage Centre, formerly St Katherine's Church

Canvey Island historically comprised multiple tracts of land belonging to different parishes, all of which had their parish churches on the mainland. Ordnance Survey maps from the 1870s show the island was then divided into seventeen parcels of land, belonging to the ten parishes of Bowers Gifford, Hadleigh, Laindon, Leigh, North Benfleet, Pitsea, Prittlewell, South Benfleet, Southchurch, and Vange.

In 1880 the island was united into a single civil parish called Canvey Island. The following year the island was also made an ecclesiastical parish, with the recently built chapel of St Katherine's becoming its parish church.

When elected parish and district councils were established in 1894, Canvey Island was given a parish council and included in the Rochford Rural District. In 1926, the parish of Canvey Island was removed from the rural district and converted into its own urban district. In 1934, Canvey Island Urban District Council built itself offices at the corner of Long Road and Sydervelt Road.

Canvey Island Urban District was abolished in 1974 and the area merged with the area of the former Benfleet Urban District on the mainland to become a new non-metropolitan district called Castle Point.

As part of the 1974 reforms, the island became unparished. A new civil parish of Canvey Island was created in 2007, with its parish council taking the name Canvey Island Town Council.

== Emergency services ==
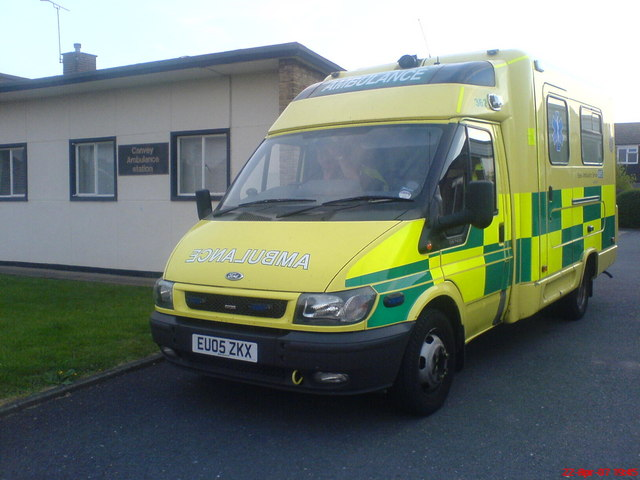
Canvey Island Ambulance Station, Sydervelt Road

All four of the UK's emergency services have bases on Canvey Island. Essex Police has a small police station located near to an On Call fire station crewed by Essex County Fire and Rescue Service. His Majesty's Coastguard also have a station located on Charfleets Industrial Estate close to Holehaven Creek. There is also a small localised ambulance station run by East of England Ambulance Service.

== Demography ==
=== Cockney diaspora ===
Like much of Essex, the population of Canvey has increased significantly in the last 100 years, with migration from London, especially East London, driving the growth. Government policy and the island's former popularity as a holiday resort were important factors. An example of the policy of moving East Londoners to Canvey and elsewhere, was the introduction of council estates for 100 families from the Dagenham and Walthamstow boroughs in 1959. Since the 2011 census, this trend has been renewed with a number of orthodox Jewish families moving to the island from the Stamford Hill neighbourhood of Hackney.

=== Statistics ===
Year	1851	1887	1901	1911	1921	1931	1939	1951	1961	1971	2001	2011	2021
Population	69	282	307	583	1,795	3,532	6,248	11,258	15,605	26,608	37,479	38,170	38,323

Canvey Island compared 2001 UK census
Category	Canvey Island	Castle Point	England
Total population	37,479	86,608	49,138,831
Foreign born	4.2%	4.6%	9.2%
White	98%	97%	91%
Asian	0.6%	0.7%	4.6%
Black	0.2%	0.2%	2.3%
Christian	74%	75%	72%
Muslim	0.2%	0.3%	3.1%
Hindu	0.1%	0.2%	1.1%
No religion	16%	15%	15%
Over 65 years old	15%	17%	16%
Unemployed	2.2%	2.4%	3.3%

At the 2001 United Kingdom census, the population of Canvey was 37,479 of which 87.9% of people were living within the five wards of the eastern area of the island at a population density of 38 persons per hectare, while the population density within the west ward – covering a larger area of the island – was 4.6 persons per hectare.

There were 15,312 dwellings on Canvey of which 98.7% were households. 42.4% were occupied by married couples, 13.9% of households contained three or more adults and no children, 26% were one person households and 8.1% were occupied by co-habiting couples. Canvey had a higher proportion at 35.2% of households owning their properties outright compared with the average of 29.2% for England, but had a lower proportion when compared to the average for Castle Point at 39.9%.

There was a higher proportion of female residents than male by 0.03%. The median age of the population was 40 years, and 23% were under 18, while 15% of residents were over 65.

The island has a high proportion of white people compared to national figures; the ethnicity recorded was 98.2% white compared with 91% for England. 0.6% of the population of Canvey were of a mixed ethnic group, while 0.6% were Asian, 0.2% Black and 0.2% Chinese.

4.2% of the population were foreign born, with 1.7% of residents born in another constituent country of the UK. 2.5% of the population were born outside the UK; and 1.2% of residents born outside Europe.

Religion was recorded as 74% Christian, 0.2% Muslim, 0.1% Jewish, 0.1% Hindu, while 16% of islanders had no religion.

The proportion of unemployed persons on Canvey was lower at 2.2% than for Castle Point at 2.4%, and England at 3.3%.

== Retail, leisure and industry ==
Canvey Island has several shopping areas. The main town centre known by older locals as the Haystack (after the pub in the town centre) is based around Furtherwick Road and the High Street. Most shops are located either in the Knightswick Centre (opened 1978) and Furtherwick Road with the lead store being Sainsbury's (formerly Key Markets). The other main store on Canvey is Morrisons which is located on Northwick Road, some way from the town centre. There are small shopping parades in St Michael's Road, The village on Long Road, Jones Corner on Long Road, Third Avenue, Point Road and dotted along the High Street. Castle Point Council are currently planning a £50m regeneration scheme for the town centre including building a larger Sainsbury's on the current Knightswick Car Park (with parking on the roof) and better connection to the town centre and the lake.

Canvey currently has a small multi screen cinema located on the seafront called Movi-Starr (opened late 1990s) which replaced the former Rio Cinema which closed in the 1970s and was replaced by Rio Bingo Hall (Furtherwick Road). There are several arcades along this stretch of the seafront, along with a small amusement park and the Monico public house. The island had previously been known for its nightlife with both the Goldmine (hosted big name DJs including Emperor Rosko and Chris Hill) and King's Nightclubs (acts included comedian Mike Read) being well known hot spots but these closed in the 1980s and 1990s respectively.

Canvey's industry is primarily based in two locations. The main location is Charfleet Industrial Estate, while there is further industrial buildings in Point Road. Canvey Island was home to Prout's Catamarans from 1949 to 2002. Canvey is also home to a Calor Gas Storage Terminal, and an Oikos Oil depot located off Thames Road and Holehaven Road.

Additionally private developers have announced a new retail park to be built next to the Morrisons supermarket at Roscommon Way on Canvey Island which was due to open in 2018. A Marks & Spencer's opened next to Morrisons in 2019 and was later accompanied by a Costa Coffee, Sports Direct, and B&M Bargains Store later followed by a Food Warehouse taking over two of the last remaining units.

== Landmarks ==
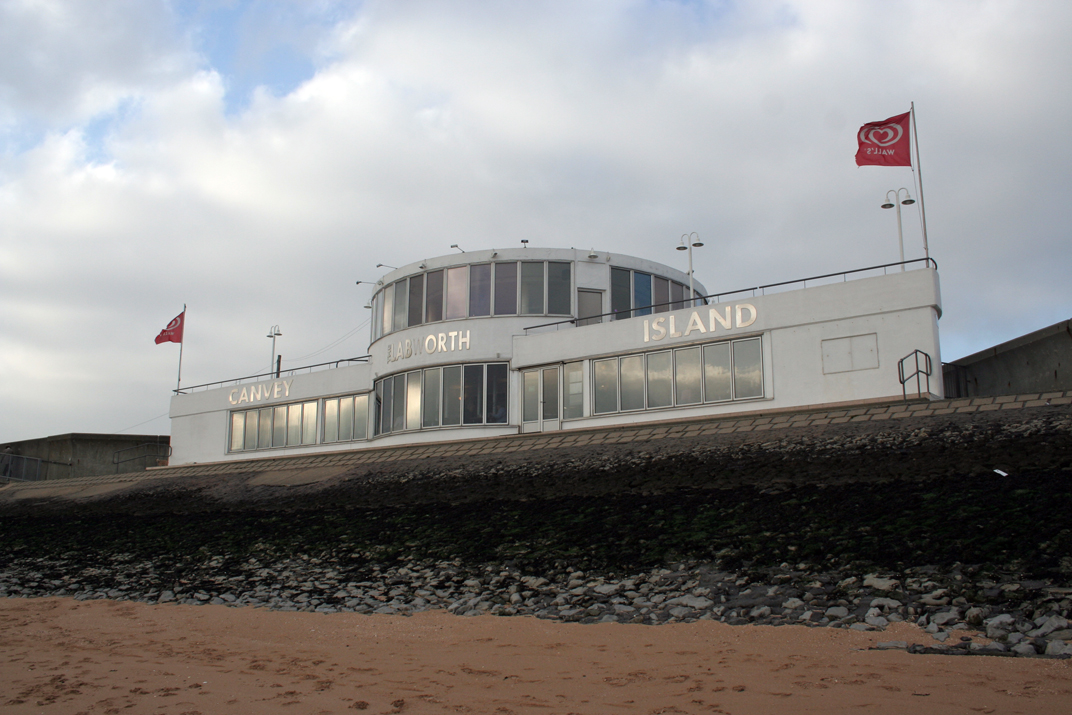
Designed by Ove Arup in 1932, the Labworth Café is a listed building situated on Canvey Island's seafront.

The Lobster Smack public house at the southwest corner of the island is a grade II listed building dated to the 17th century. The pub was known to Charles Dickens who mentioned it in Great Expectations. Alongside the pub is a row of wooden Coastguard cottages that date from the late 19th century which are also of grade II listed status.

Landmarks from the era of Canvey's development as a seaside resort in the 20th century include the Labworth Café built 1932–33 and designed by Ove Arup in the International style. The building fell into a state of disrepair in the 1970s and 1980s but was renovated in 1996 and now functions as both a beach bistro and restaurant.

Opened in 1979, the Heritage Centre along Canvey Road is housed in the former St Katherine's Church, which was built in 1874. Originally timber-framed, the church was rendered over in the 1930s to give it its present appearance; it closed as a place of worship in 1962. It now contains an art and craft centre with a small folk museum.

The island is also home to two Dutch Cottages, one in Haven Road and the other on Canvey Road, which were built during the 17th century by Dutch immigrants working on the sea walls. The cottage at Canvey Road is home to the Dutch Cottage museum.

Some of Canvey's lost landmarks include the Goldmine club on Western Esplanade, the original Oysterfleet public house and lighthouse and Cherry Stores.

== Listed buildings ==
There are five grade II listed buildings recorded in the National Heritage List for England for Canvey Island.

Name	Grade	Location	Type	Completed (Note: The date given is the date used by Historic England as significant for the initial building or that of an important part in the structure's description.)	Date designated	Grid ref. (Note: The grid reference is based on the British national grid reference system, sometimes known as OSGB36, used by the Ordnance Survey.) Geo-coordinates	Notes	Entry number (Note: The "List Entry Number" is a unique number assigned to each listed building and scheduled monument by Historic England.)	Image	Wikidata
Dutch Cottage	II	Canvey Road	local museum		5 February 1952	TQ7745283783; 51°31′30″N 0°33′24″E		1123684	Dutch Cottage More images	Q26416751
1 and 1a, Haven Road	II	1 and 1a, Haven Road			13 September 1973	TQ7737082234; 51°30′40″N 0°33′17″E		1123686	Upload Photo	Q26416753
Dutch Cottage	II	6, Haven Road			5 February 1952	TQ7798583179; 51°31′10″N 0°33′50″E		1337690	Upload Photo	Q64615588
The Lobster Smack Public House	II	Haven Road	pub		3 November 1972	TQ7724482229; 51°30′40″N 0°33′10″E		1123685	The Lobster Smack Public House More images	Q26416752
Labworth Cafe	II	Western Esplanade	cafÃ©		16 April 1996	TQ8014282398; 51°30′42″N 0°35′41″E		1268484	Labworth Cafe More images	Q6467706

== Transport ==
=== Road ===
Canvey Island is connected to the mainland in the northwest by two roads with bridges: the A130 (Canvey Way) and the B1014 (Canvey Road). Built in 1972, the A130 crosses East Haven Creek to Bowers Gifford and joins the London-Southend A13 at Sadler's Farm Roundabout. The two lanes of the A130 are currently the island's primary access route with 25,000 vehicles using the road and bridge per day. The B1014 and Canvey Road Bridge (or Canvey Bridge) crosses Benfleet Creek to South Benfleet, and provides access to the c2c London (Fenchurch Street) to Shoeburyness line via Benfleet railway station.

Canvey Road Bridge was built in 1973, and replaced the island's first bridge to the mainland, which dated from 1931. The 91 metres (299 ft) Colvin Bridge – named after the Lord Lieutenant of Essex, Brigadier-General R.B. Colvin – operated with a sliding 18 m (59 ft) central section that retracted for boats passing along Benfleet Creek. Prior to the Colvin Bridge's construction, crossing the creek was achieved by either rowing-boat ferry or by a gravel causeway or stepping-stones at low tides.

==== Congestion and the third road ====
Since the late 1970s, residents and local politicians have campaigned for the construction of a third access route (or "third road") to ease the island's congestion at rush hour and as a viable means of evacuation from flooding or industrial accidents at the petrochemical facilities. In 2008, the congestion and failure to secure the construction of such a route or significant improvements has had the island at "breaking point" and on the verge of "civil unrest". Plans for the third access route have included a tunnel to Kent, and road bridges to places such as Leigh-on-Sea and Coryton. Opposition to the route cite the enormous cost, the environmental damage, and the increase of vehicles to districts with already overburdened traffic systems.

The island's access congestion was partially addressed by Essex Council in December 2011 with its completion of the £12.1 million Roscommon Way Extension. The road runs from Northwick Road to Haven Road, providing a bypass for small numbers of traffic and adding a new entrance to Charfleet Industrial Estate while also remaining navigable in the case of flooding. However, the road did not gain public support, and the extension has become known as 'The Road to Nowhere'.

=== Bus and rail ===
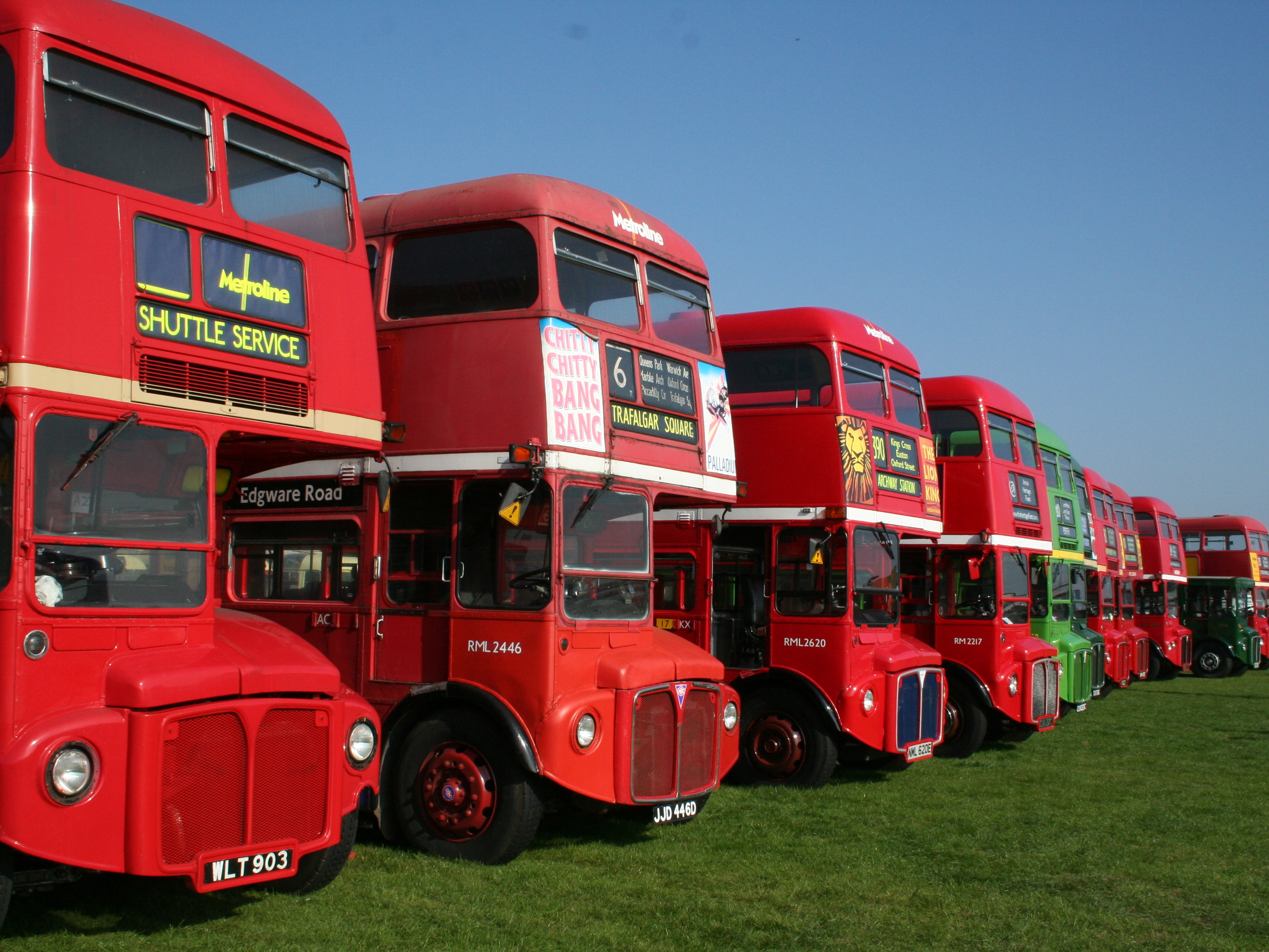
AEC Routemaster buses at Labworth car park for the classic vehicle event.

Bus services have been running on Canvey since 1906. From 1934, the services ran from the island's local bus depot at Leigh Beck by the Canvey & District Bus Co, later to be incorporated into the Eastern National Omnibus Company. The depot closed in 1978, but the building re-opened a year later as the Castle Point Transport Museum. The museum currently houses a collection of buses, commercial, military and emergency vehicles, and general items related to public road transport. Organised by volunteers, the museum's annual show and open days coincide with a classic vehicle cruise that convenes at the car parks of the seafront.

The current bus services on the island are operated by First Essex from the Hadleigh bus depot and Arriva Southend. First Essex is the main operator providing the island's internal services via the town centre, and provides services to places such as Southend, Basildon, Rayleigh and Hullbridge. The 21C bus runs from Canvey Seafront to Hadleigh via Essex Way but only runs during offpeak time on weekdays. The Arriva Southend services are the 1X/1S.

Both bus companies provide services to Benfleet railway station, which is located close to Canvey Bridge, just north of the island. The railway station has a taxi rank. Train services are provided by c2c between London Fenchurch Street and Southend Central/Shoeburyness.

== Education ==
Canvey Island has two comprehensive schools: the Cornelius Vermuyden School and Castle View School. Both were rebuilt in 2012 as replacements for the island's three ageing comprehensives, and as a response to the island's decreasing numbers of 11- to 16-year-olds.

Cornelius Vermuyden occupies the same site as its predecessor near Waterside Farm, while Castle View School – within the town centre and centre of the island – has replaced Furtherwick Park School, having previously existed within the island's north/central Winter Gardens Ward, overlooked by Hadleigh Castle. Furtherwick Park School shut in 2010, remaining pupils were then moved to Castle View School to finish their education. This site is now the location of Canvey Skills Campus which was built in 2013 and provided vocational education for 14- to 19-year-olds, and adult learning and was run by PROCAT. However, after the merger of South Essex College and PROCAT, the centre was closed and was reopened by USP College in September 2021 as their XTEND digital campus and new home to its digital apprenticeship provider ITEC.

== Culture ==
=== Folklore ===
The island has only been populated since the 17th century when the Dutch including reputedly Cornelius Vermuyden made the marshlands habitable. There are local legends of a Dutchman carrying a sack wandering the northern parts of the island.

The story of 'The Black Man' and 'The White Lady' is believed to be a mythical tale conjured up by smugglers to stop people wandering onto the 'saltings' and finding their smuggled goods. It was said that 'The Black Man' offered a price for your soul, while the 'White Woman' would tempt you to dance with her. Men often spoke of trying to chase away the figures, only to watch them vanish before their eyes.

Many night fishermen have reported seeing a tall, burly Viking standing on the mudflats at The Point, on the far eastern side of the island. It is believed that he was left behind by his fleet and waited for his ship to return; only to drown in the rising tide.

According to an urban legend, a female farmhand at the now demolished Knightswick Farm watched a nun approach the farm from the fields one afternoon from the porch of the farmhouse. Puzzled as to why the nun had walked across the muddy fields, the girl left the porch and walked towards the nun intending to greet her. Allegedly the nun began to vanish into the ground as she walked.

In 1954, a carcass of an unidentified sea animal with "five-toed feet" washed ashore on the island. Due to its outlandish appearance and the fact that locals had not seen such fish before, the carcass became known as the "Canvey Island Monster" and sparked foreign interest, especially from enthusiasts in the field of researching cryptids. Residents of Canvey Island also claimed that there were "humanoid" features on the carcass, leading to rumours of sea monsters residing in the water around the island. Ufologist and radio presenter Frank Edwards even claimed that said creature was able to walk on land and was responsible for the 1855 Devil's Footprints incident. However, this so-called "sea monster" was later identified as being the bloated, dead carcass of an anglerfish by former ichthyologist and museum curator Alwyne Cooper Wheeler.

=== Music ===
Canvey Island was an influential destination in the 1970s for artists of the pub rock genre of music such as Graham Parker, Elvis Costello, Eddie and the Hot Rods, Nick Lowe, Paul Andrew Smith Wednesday and The Kursaal Flyers, while also being home to "Canvey Island's finest" band Dr. Feelgood. During the 1970s The Goldmine opened in the former Bay Country Club and the name became synonymous with the Brit funk movement with regular DJ Chris Hill. The community hall, The Paddocks, was host to a number of big name gigs during the 1970s including Queen in March 1974, Elvis Costello, Clive Langer and Nick Lowe along with jazz and blues singer George Melly.

The island continues to be a source of inspiration for artists such as British Sea Power who included a song entitled "Canvey Island" on their 2008 album Do You Like Rock Music?

Peter Green, founding member of Fleetwood Mac, lived on Canvey after leaving the band.

=== Cultural references ===
Canvey Island is the setting for the British author Nicola Barker's 2002 novel Behindlings. The island was also the subject of 2006 Turner Prize nominee Rebecca Warren's 2003 painted clay sculpture titled Canvey Island. Canvey was also home to a Prada fashion shoot in 2014 starring James McAvoy, and featured in BBC's Silent Witness shown on 2 and 3 February 2015.

== Media ==
The area is served by BBC London and ITV London with television signals received from Crystal Palace TV transmitter, BBC South East and ITV Meridian can also be received from Bluebell Hill TV transmitter.

Local radio stations are BBC Essex on 95.3 FM, Heart on 96.3 FM and Radio Essex on 105.1 FM.

The local newspapers are The Evening Echo and The Canvey and Benfleet Times.

== Sport ==
Canvey Island has two senior semi-professional football teams in Canvey Island F.C. (founded in 1926) ('The Gulls') and Concord Rangers F.C. (founded in 1967) ('The Beachboys'). Despite Canvey Island F.C. reached the National League in 2004 and won the FA Trophy in 2001, while Concord Rangers were Essex Senior Cup champions consecutively between 2013 and 2016.

Amateur participation in sport is popular on the island, with sports such as rugby union, cricket, and martial arts represented by clubs and corresponding facilities. The Castle Point Golf Course is situated on Canvey, and the Waterside Farm Sports Centre (refurbished 2013) provides members of Castle Point district with access to a swimming pool, an athletics track, general purpose sports halls, and a full size artificial surface football pitch. It is also the headquarters of Canvey Island Swimming Club, which provides coaching for children ages 4 and upwards from beginners to competitive swimming through to national standard.

Water sports are also popular recreational pursuits. Canvey has one sailing club, the Island Yacht Club. Benfleet Yacht Club and slipway is situated on the island at Benfleet Creek in the north (outside of the sea wall). A region between Thorney bay and Labworth beach is designated by the Port of London Authority as an approved windsurfing area. The Canvey Island Swimming Club provides lessons and training and is based at Waterside Farm Leisure Centre.

The British record for the largest shore-caught angler fish (Lophius piscatorius) is from Canvey Island, caught by H. Legerton in 1967.

== Notable people ==
- Lee Brilleaux, vocalist and founder of influential 1970s rhythm and blues group Dr. Feelgood, moved to Canvey Island with his family when he was 13.
- Robert Denmark, Olympic and Commonwealth (gold) 5,000 metres athlete, attended Furtherwick Park School
- Ty Gooden, who played between 1992 and 2005 for teams including Arsenal and Swindon Town F.C., was sold in 2003 to non-league Canvey Island.
- Peter Green, founding member of Fleetwood Mac, lived on Canvey after leaving the band.
- Clara James, one of the founding members in 1889 of The Women's Trade Union Association (WTUA), established a holiday home on the island and served from 1925 as a parish councillor. She died on Canvey in 1956.
- Wilko Johnson, guitarist and composer best known for his work with Dr. Feelgood, who also played with The Blockheads, The Wilko Johnson Band and Roger Daltrey, was born on Canvey.
- Jessica Judd, middle-distance runner for UK Athletics, grew up on the island and was educated at Castle View.
- Lew Lewis, harmonica player with Eddie and the Hot Rods who later had his own group, and guested with The Stranglers and The Clash. was brought up in the same street as Lee Brilleaux.
- Dominic Lyne, author, was born and lived on Canvey until the age of 4.
- Dean Marney, currently playing for Fleetwood Town F.C., is a former St Katherine's Primary School pupil.
- Dean Macey, Olympic decathlete, was born and raised on the island.
- Ebenezer Joseph Mather, the founder of Royal National Mission to Deep Sea Fishermen, spent his retirement on the island. He died on 23 December 1927 and was buried in the grounds of St Nicholas church.
- Ashley George Old, war artist, lived on Canvey from the mid-1960s until his death in 2001.
- Geoffrey Prout, boat builder and author
- Frank Saul, FA Cup winner in 1967 with Tottenham Hotspur F.C., was born on Canvey.
- Bill Sparks, survivor of Operation Franckton aka "The Cockleshell Heroes", lived on Canvey Island before the war.
- Peter Taylor, temporary manager of the England football team in 2000, went to school at Furtherwick Park School and started his youth career at Canvey Island F.C.

== Arms ==
Coat of arms of Canvey Island

Notes
Originally granted to Canvey Island Urban District Council on 5 January 1971, transferred to successor parish in 2008.
Crest
On a wreath Or and Azure on a mount of earth a representation of a Canvey Island Dutch cottage all Proper.
Escutcheon
Barry undy Argent and Azure gutty reversed Argent on a lozenge throughout Vert a fat-tailed sheep couchant Proper within an escutcheon voided embattled overall Or between four oyster shells Proper.
Motto
Ex Mare Dei Gratia (From The Sea by the Grace of God)

== See also ==
- Islands in the River Thames
- List of places on land with elevations below sea level

== Bibliography ==
- Barsby, Geoff. (1992). Canvey Island. Phillimore & Co. LTD. ISBN 0-85033-846-8.
- Bettley, James. (2007). Essex. (p. 192). Yale University Press. ISBN 0-300-11614-4.
- Bills, Leslie Wm. (2004). Canvey Island – A Rising Tide. Cavenham Marine. ISBN 1-899329-16-1.
- Birch, Will (2000). No Sleep Till Canvey Island: The Great Pub Rock Revolution. Virgin Books. ISBN 0-7535-0411-1.
- Camden, William (1586). Essex and Suffolk. A vision of Britain.
- Castree, Noel. (2005). Nature. Strange Natures: Britain's rainforest. Routledge. ISBN 0-415-33905-7.
- Cornish, C. J. (2004). The Naturalist on the Thames. Canvey Island. (p. 123). Kessinger Publishing. ISBN 1-4191-7527-0.
- Cross-Rudkin, Peter; Chrimes, Mike (2008). A Biographical Dictionary of Civil Engineers in Great Britain and Ireland: Vol 2: 1830 to 1890. Thomas Telford. ISBN 978-0-7277-3504-1.
- Crowe, Ken. The Early Medieval Settlement of Canvey Island. (p. 12–17). Essex Jnl 31.1.
- Darby, H. C. (1986). Domesday England. Pasture for sheep in Essex. Cambridge University Press. ISBN 0-521-31026-1.
- English Place-Name Society. (1926). Survey of English Place-names. Cambridge University press.
- Holland, Julian. (2007). Exploring the Islands of England and Wales. Canvey Island. (p. 88). Frances Lincoln ltd. ISBN 0-7112-2743-8.
- Kelly's Directory of Essex. (1933). Canvey Island. (londonpublichouse.com) Retrieved: 2008-03-27.
- Long, Bob and Gardner, Bob. (2004). Guide to Storage Tanks and Equipment. John Wiley and Sons. ISBN 1-86058-431-4.
- MacBean, Alexander & Johnson, Samuel. (1773). A Dictionary of Ancient Geography. CR: Counos, Ptolemy. Pub. G. Robinson [etc.].
- Pigot's Essex 1832–3 Trade Directory. Canvey Island. (londonpublichouse.com) Retrieved: 2008-03-27.
- Post Office Directory of Essex. (1871). Canvey Island. (londonpublichouse.com) Retrieved: 2008-03-27.
- Rodwell, W. J. (1966). The excavation of a Red Hill on Canvey Island. Transactions of the Essex Archaeological Society.
- Stratton, Michael. (2000). Twentieth Century Industrial Archaeology. Taylor & Francis. ISBN 0-419-24680-0.
- Thayer, Bill. (2003). Reproduction of a section of The Geography of Claudius Ptolemy published by Dover Publications, 1991.
- Walton, John K. (2000). The British Seaside: Holidays and Resorts in the Twentieth Century. Manchester University Press. ISBN 0-7190-5170-3.
- White, Susan. (1994). The History of Canvey Island: Five Generations. The Bookshop Canvey Island (pub). ISBN 0952000202.
- Wilson, John Marius. (1866). The Imperial Gazetteer of England & Wales. Canvey Island. Pub. Edinburgh, A. Fullarton.

Next island upstream	River Thames	Next island downstream
Lower Horse Island	Canvey Island; Grid reference TQ789829	Two Tree Island
