= Ron Jenkins =

Ron Jenkins may refer to:

- Ron Jenkins (sprinter) (born 1952), American former sprinter
- Ron Jenkins (weightlifter) (1929–2005), Welsh weightlifter

== See also ==
- Ronald Jenkins (1907–1975), English civil engineer
- Ronney Jenkins (born 1977), American former NFL player
