= Two Tree Island =

Island in Essex, England

Coordinates: 51°32′10″N 0°37′43″E

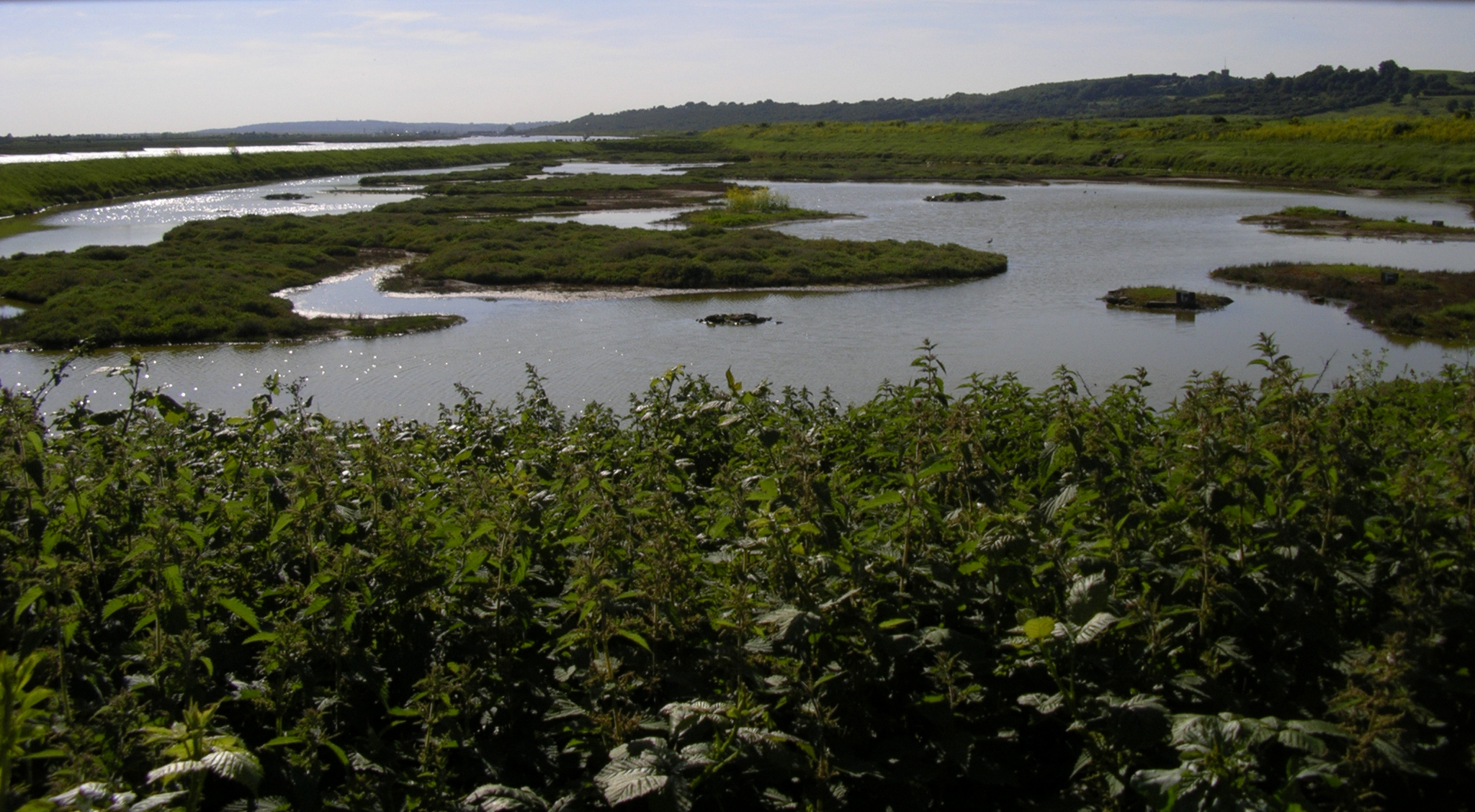
The scrape on Two Tree Island, seen from the hide

Two Tree Island is a small island lying north-east of Canvey Island and south-west of Leigh-on-Sea in Essex, England. It covers 257 hectares (640 acres) and is connected to the mainland at Leigh by a single span bridge.

The island was reclaimed from the Thames Estuary in the 18th century and used as pasture until 1910 when a sewage works was built on it. From 1936, the entire island was used as a landfill site; this was later reduced to a single small site on the island in 1974. It is now a nature reserve, run by Essex Wildlife Trust, and the eastern half is part of the Leigh National Nature Reserve. At the western end were two bird hides; overlooking a purpose-built scrape or lagoon where waders feed to the west and Benfleet Creek/Canvey Island Leigh Beck to the southwest. Both hides were destroyed by vandals in 2019; however, the lagoon and creek can still be viewed from where the hides stood and at other locations on the island's west side. There are two more bird hides on the east side, one over the scrape and one over the former landfill reservoir. During the breeding season both waders (including avocets) and gulls nest here. A nest watch has been organised for some years following a serious case of avocet egg stealing. As well as a nature reserve, Two Tree Island functions within the community. At the end of the island road on the south side, is a sloping concrete jetty, operated by the Port of London Authority, a boat storage area and two car parks. 6th Westliff and 2nd Chalkwell Bay Scout groups' water activity centre is located at the end of the car park. In the centre of the west side is an airfield, home of Southend Radio Flying Club and South Essex Model Aircraft Society, hosting various airshows throughout the year as well as regular flying practice and training.

Though the island's history dates back to the 18th century its involvement with war is clear. At the end of the east side of the island stand two pillboxes, one stands on the island, the other on Leigh Marshes. At low tide the one to the east is discernible by walking out over a bank path built on the marsh and the one on the island can be viewed easily, though access inside is restricted due to cultivating plants and the structure is derelict. The pillboxes were part of a communication and signal system developed during the Great War. They can be reached from the north end car park with a 5-minute walk or from the south end car park with a 10-minute walk.

== See also ==
- Islands in the River Thames

Next island upstream	River Thames	Next island downstream
Canvey Island	Two Tree Island	Isle of Sheppey
