= Dominic Lyne =

British writer (born 1983)

- Born: 1983 (age 42–43); Canvey Island, Essex, United Kingdom
- Occupations: Novelist, poet, musician, and artist
- Writing career
- Genre: Transgressive Fiction
- Subjects: Mental health, dissociation, sexuality, and drug usage.
- Website: www.dominiclyne.com

Dominic Lyne (born 1983) is an English author, currently based in London. Common themes within his work include drug abuse, dissociation, sexuality, and mental health issues.

== Work ==
Lyne was born in Canvey Island, Essex.

Common themes within his work include drug abuse, dissociation, sexuality, and mental health issues. Influenced by authors such as Dennis Cooper, Bret Easton Ellis, Chuck Palahniuk, and William S. Burroughs, his body of work aims to create conversations about what is considered to be the darker sides of humanity and society, such as addiction and psychosis. His Cycle-2 series charts the beginnings of his journey through the mental health system through a collection of illustrated shorts and diary entries.

== Bibliography ==
=== Prose ===
- A Boy David: Weg von den Wolfen (1999)
- A Boy David: Pause for Thought (2000)
- The Mushroom Diaries (2009)
- Ink Spills and Five Notes of Suicide (2010)
- Best Friends Forever (2011) – with Jeff Michalik
- Thoughts of Discord (2012)
- Transmissions (2012)
- And Mother's Eyes Will Bleed (2013)
- The Heart of Darkness (2014)
- In Dreams We Sleep (2020)

=== Poetry ===
- Visions of Wormwood (2012)
- Lullabies for Salvation (2012)
- The Voice that Betrayed (2014)
- Into the Mind of Whoredom (2016)
- Who Painted the Sky Blue (2023)
- The Sky was Empty, but Still the Thunder Rolled (2025)

=== Cycle-2 Series ===
- Paradise is Nowhere (2011)
- Lying Wasted Under a Broken Coda (2011)
- The Silent Scream (2012)
- Screams of Silence (2012)
