= Ove Arup =

Founder of Arup (1895–1988)

Sir Ove Arup CBE
- Born: 16 April 1895; Newcastle upon Tyne, England
- Died: 5 February 1988 (aged 92); London, England
- Education: Sorø Academy; University of Copenhagen; Polyteknisk Læreanstalt
- Spouse: Ruth Sørensen
- Engineering career
- Discipline: Structural engineer
- Institutions: Institution of Structural Engineers
- Practice name: Arup
- Projects: Sydney Opera House; Centre Pompidou; Kingsgate Bridge; Highpoint I Labworth Café
- Awards: IStructE Gold Medal; RIBA Gold Medal

Sir Ove Nyquist Arup (16 April 1895 – 5 February 1988) was a British engineer with Danish heritage who founded Arup, a multinational corporation offering engineering, design, planning, project management, and consulting services for building systems. Ove Arup is considered to be among the foremost architectural structural engineers of his time.

== Personal life and education ==
Arup was born in Newcastle, England, in 1895, to the Danish veterinary surgeon Jens Simon Johannes Arup and his Norwegian wife, Mathilde Bolette Nyquist.

Arup attended the Sorø Academy in Denmark, a boarding school influenced by Thomas Arnold of Rugby School in the United Kingdom.

In 1913, he began studying philosophy at the University of Copenhagen and in 1918 enrolled in an engineering degree at the Technical University of Denmark, Copenhagen, specializing in reinforced concrete. He completed his studies in 1922. At this time, Ove Arup was influenced by Le Corbusier and his publication Vers une architecture, published that year, as well as by Walter Gropius, the founder of the Bauhaus movement.

Arup married Ruth Sørensen, known as Li, on 13 August 1925.

== Working life ==
=== Before WWII ===
In 1922, Ove Arup began working with the Danish firm Christiani & Nielsen in Hamburg, and in December 1923, he moved to their London office as chief engineer.

He designed the Labworth Café—a café with two integrated shelters located on the promenade of the Essex seaside resort of Canvey Island. The café remains the only building solely designed by Arup.

Arup then worked as a structural consultant for the Tecton partnership, notably on the Penguin Pool at London's Regent's Park Zoo, as well as on projects at Whipsnade Zoo, Dudley Zoo, a villa in Heath Drive, Romford, Essex, and Highpoint I in Highgate—a building he later criticized. The close working relationship that Arup developed with Tecton's senior partner Berthold Lubetkin proved highly significant in advancing both men's careers.

He subsequently joined the London construction company J. L. Kier & Co. as director and chief designer from 1934 to 1938. During the 1930s, Arup also collaborated with notable architects such as Ernő Goldfinger, Wells Coates, Maxwell Fry, Yorke, Rosenberg & Mardall, and Marcel Breuer.

In 1935, he became a member of the executive committee of the MARS Group. In 1938, he and his cousin Arne founded Arup & Arup Limited, a firm of engineers and contractors.

=== World War II ===
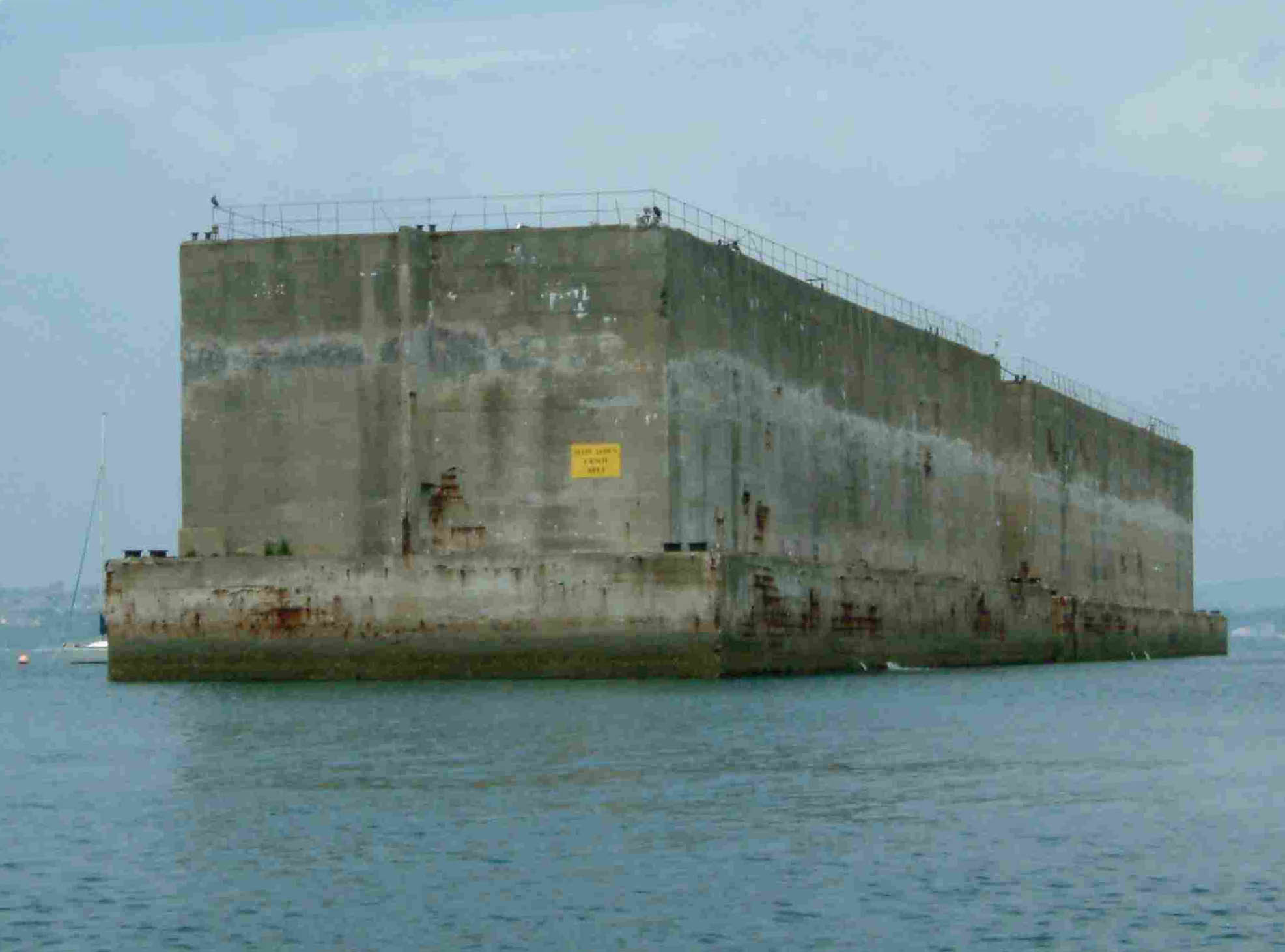
A pair of Phoenix breakwaters at Portland Harbour

Before World War II, Ove Arup was a member of the Air Raid Precautions (ARP) organising committee, where he advised Finsbury Council on the provision of bomb shelters. During the war, he published several papers on shelter policy and designs, advocating for reinforced concrete mass shelters as opposed to the government’s policy of dispersing the population in small domestic shelters. However, most of his recommendations were not adopted due to political reasons, though some affluent Londoners were able to build concrete shelters based on his designs.

Arup played a significant role in the design of the Mulberry temporary harbours used during the D-Day landings. The Mulberry Harbour was a type of temporary harbour developed to offload cargo on the beaches during the Allied invasion of Normandy. The sections for two prefabricated or artificial military harbours were transported with the invading army from England across the English Channel and assembled off the coast of Normandy as part of the D-Day invasion of France in 1944.

=== Arup & Partners ===
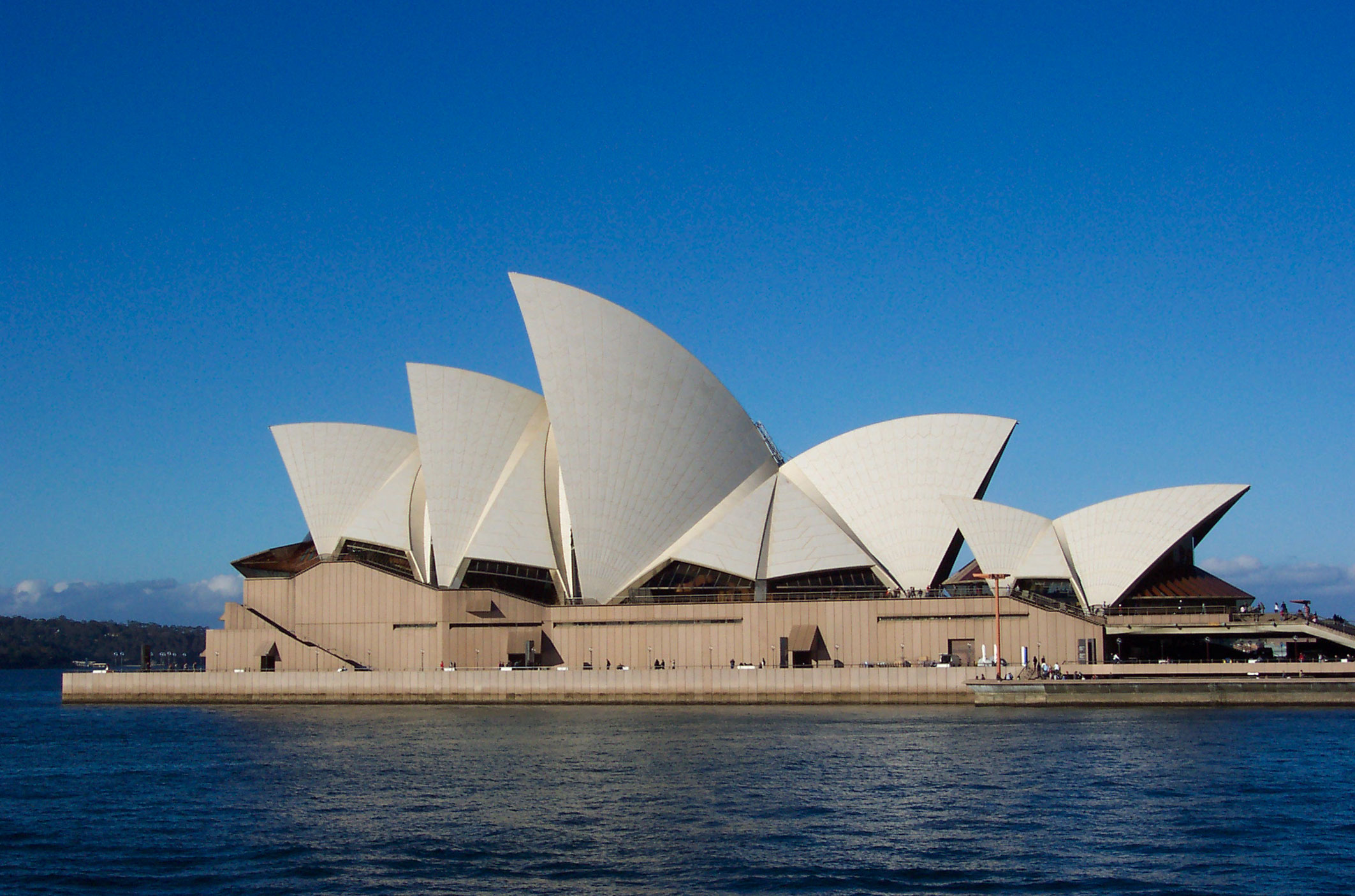
Arup led the engineering design of the Sydney Opera House and made its construction possible.

In 1946, after dissolving Arup & Arup Ltd, Ove Arup created a team of civil and structural engineering consultants. In the same year, he formed his first partnership with Ronald Jenkins, Geoffrey Wood, and Andrew Young, called Arup and Partners.

In 1963, a further company, ArupArup Associates, was formed as a new partnership. This body included architects and engineers working on an equal basis as building designers, including the engineer Ove Arup, the architects Francis Pym and Philip Dowson, and the former partners of Arup and Partners. It was a multidisciplinary company providing engineering, architectural, and other services for the built environment. Arup himself noted that ultimately, all of the Arup entities resulted in a firm known simply as Arup.

== Notable projects ==
=== Highpoint I ===
Highpoint I, built in 1935, was an important experiment in high-rise residential design and one of Arup's most significant collaborations with Berthold Lubetkin. However, Arup later criticized the project, noting that it had significant flaws.

=== Kingsgate Bridge ===
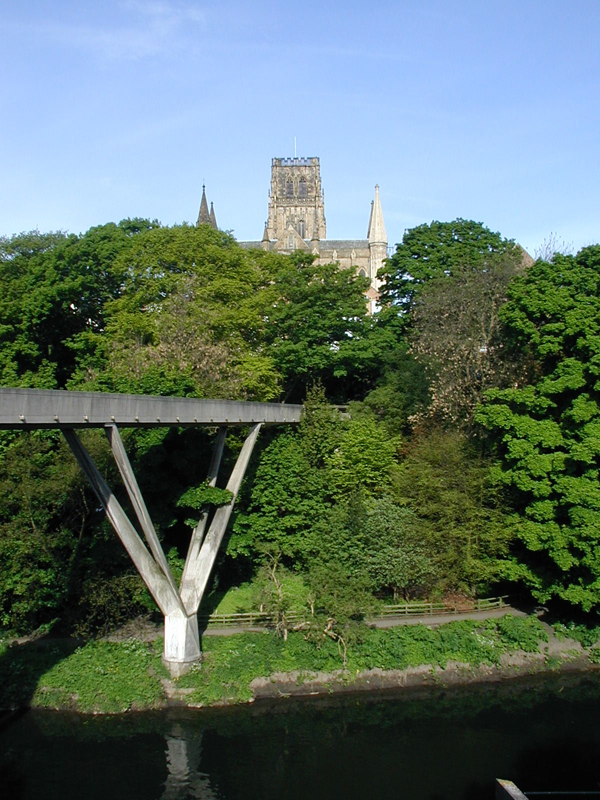
Kingsgate Bridge as seen from the Durham Students' Union, with Durham Cathedral above

Ove Arup personally supervised the design and construction of Durham's Kingsgate Bridge in 1963. As the firm's first bridge project, Arup held a particular attachment to it, and after his death, his ashes were scattered from the bridge. A bust of Arup, placed at one end of the bridge, was stolen in the summer of 2006 but has since been replaced. Kingsgate Bridge was the last structure designed by Arup.

=== Van Ginkel Footbridge ===
The mid-century Van Ginkel Footbridge is located in Bowring Park, St. John's, Newfoundland and Labrador, Canada. It is a cantilever bridge, meaning it is anchored to the ground on one end, while the other end extends outward, unsupported. The bridge was granted heritage designation in 2020. The architect of the bridge was Blanche Lemco van Ginkel, who received the Royal Architectural Institute of Canada's Gold Medal for lifetime achievement.

=== Sydney Opera House ===
Arup served as the design engineer for the Sydney Opera House in Sydney, Australia, from the project's inception in 1957 until its completion in 1973. This iconic building, which made groundbreaking use of precast concrete, structural glue, and computer analysis, significantly bolstered Arup's reputation, as well as that of his firm, despite the extremely challenging working relationship with the architect, Jørn Utzon.

== Honours ==
- 1953: Commander of the Order of the British Empire (CBE)
- 1965: Knight First Class of the Order of the Dannebrog
- 1966: Royal Gold Medal of the Royal Institute of British Architects
- 1971: Knight Bachelor
- 1973: Gold Medal of the Institution of Structural Engineers
- 1975: Knight Commander First Class of the Order of the Dannebrog
- 1976: Honorary Doctorate from Heriot-Watt University
- 1987: Royal Academician
