= Furtherwick Park School =

Location
- Furtherwick Road; Canvey Island, Essex, SS8 7AZ; England; 51°31′16″N 0°35′43″E

Information
- Established: 1957
- Closed: 2011
- Local authority: Essex
- Specialist: Art College
- Department for Education URN: 115333 Tables
- Ofsted: Reports
- Headteacher: John Houghton
- Gender: Coeducational
- Age: 11 to 16
- Enrolment: 1,124 pupils
- Website: http://www.furtherwick.essex.sch.uk/

Furtherwick Park School was a comprehensive co-educational senior school for 11- to 16-year-olds, located on Canvey Island. The school was based in the town centre and opened in 1957 due to the increase of population on Canvey Island.

== History ==
Between 1957 and 1965 it was known as 'Canvey Secondary'. It was renamed to 'Furtherwick Park School' in 1966.

In 1976 sections of the school were damaged by fire.

It celebrated its 50th anniversary in 2007 and received media Arts College status. The school had around 1,000 pupils.

The school closed in 2011 due to a reduction in pupil numbers on Canvey Island, which caused great concern amongst parents. The grounds were reused for the new Castle View School which moved to new buildings on the location of the former school.

== In the media ==
The school was used as a location for the filming of the British film Bloody Kids.

In 2008 the school was highlighted as a pioneer of the British School prom in The Daily Telegraph.

== OFSTED report ==
In 2003 OFSTED reported the school as poor and to be put into special measures. This was challenged by the head teacher, Wendy Misson, and the HMI inspection team reversed the decision to requires improvement on their visit.

The final OFSTED report judged the school satisfactory, an improvement on previous years when the school was judged failing on several key benchmarks.

== Notable former pupils ==
- Rob Denmark - UK Middle-distance runner
- Peter Taylor - former England football caretaker manager
