= Lower Horse =

Island in the River Thames, England

Coordinates: 51.51670°N 0.53520°E

Lower Horse is a 31.1-acre (12.6 ha) uninhabited island off the English coast, lying in the Thames Estuary between Canvey Island and Stanford-le-Hope, close to grid reference TQ760828.

== Ownership and size ==
It is part of Thurrock unitary authority; an internal border of its historical and ceremonial county Essex, namely of the administrative county of Essex is between it and Canvey Island.

Within, smaller than normal marks for a patch of saltings (traditional, open air, sea salt extraction through drying) feature in the leading map of 1919, which confirms the island's acreage.

== Geography ==
Consisting of permanent marshland with six small internal creeks draining to the north; Lower Horse is part of the group of islands (five of which later re-clustered to form Canvey Island), that broke away from the English coastline in the medieval period.

== See also ==
- Islands in the River Thames

Next island upstream	River Thames	Next island downstream
Chiswick Eyot; Note: Frog Island and Isle of Dogs are peninsulas	Lower Horse	Canvey Island
