= Benfleet and Southend Marshes =

Site of Special Scientific Interest (SSSI) in Essex

- Site of Special Scientific Interest
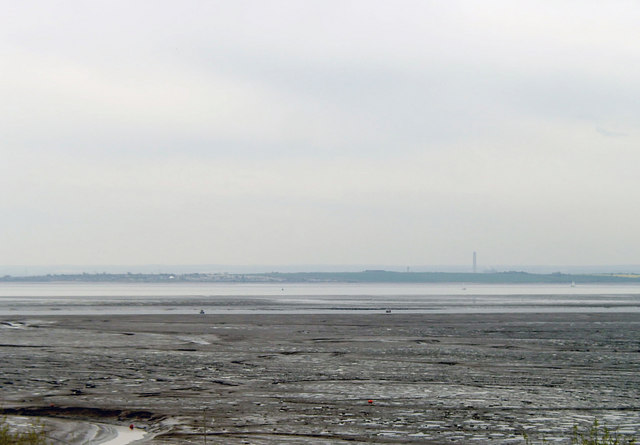
- Location of Benfleet and Southend Marshes.
- Area of search: Essex
- Grid reference: TQ854847
- Interest: Biological
- Area: 2,099.7 ha (5,188 acres)
- Notification date: 1987
- Location map: Magic Map

Designations

Ramsar Wetland
- Official name: Benfleet & Southend Marshes
- Designated: 14 February 1994
- Reference no.: 648

Benfleet and Southend Marshes is an 8.1-square-mile (21 km^{2}) Site of Special Scientific Interest (SSSI) in Essex. It consists of mudflats, salt marshes, scrub and wild grassland, and includes the Southend-on-Sea foreshore. It has been so recognised for its biological (including ecological) value, rather than geological. A definition five percent larger forms the Benfleet and Southend Marshes Ramsar site and Special Protection Area. In the centre-west, more than ten percent of the Site is the Leigh National Nature Reserve (NNR), (Note: 257.5 hectares) which has been appraised in detail in A Nature Conservation Review as a site of national importance. The SSSI and NNR include the eastern half of Two Tree Island, in Leigh on Sea which is managed by the Essex Wildlife Trust. A narrow majority of the Site is the Southend on Sea Foreshore Local Nature Reserve. (Note: 1083.9 hectares)

The marshes and mudflats have internationally important numbers of wildfowl and wading birds, including the dark-bellied brent goose, grey plover, redshank and red knot. Scarce invertebrates, such as the white-letter hairstreak and marbled white butterfly, have adapted to specific habitats in the marshes.

Major landowners within Benfleet and Southend Marshes SSSI include the Ministry of Defence, Network Rail and Crown Estate.
