= Labworth Café =

Labworth Restaurant & Café
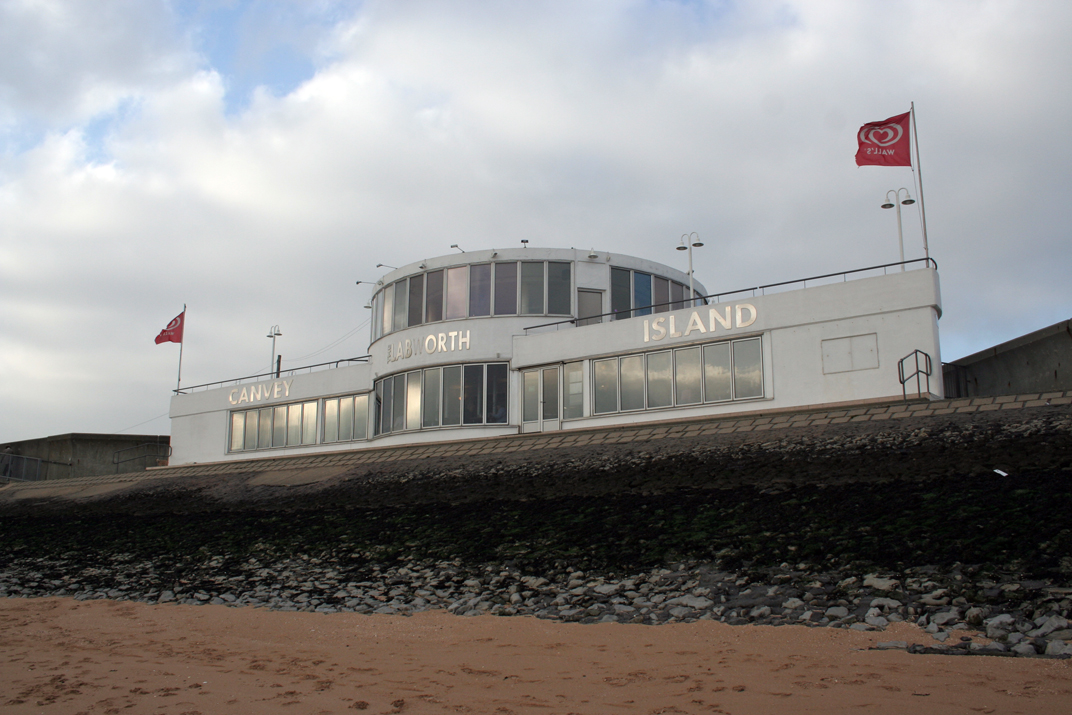

- Location of the Restaurant & Café within Essex
- 51.51183°N 0.59459°E
- Location: Western Esplanade, Canvey Island, Essex, United Kingdom

History
- Built: 1933

Site notes
- Architect: Ove Arup
- Architectural style: International style

Listed Building – Grade II
- Official name: The Labworth restaurant and beach bistro
- Designated: 16 April 1996
- Reference no.: 1268484

The Labworth Restaurant & Café is a modernist International style reinforced concrete building overlooking the Thames estuary at Labworth beach on Canvey Island, Essex. Built in 1932–1933 by Ove Arup to resemble the bridge of the Queen Mary, it exists as the only building solely designed by the distinguished engineer.

== History ==
The café and shelter were designed while Arup worked as the architect, engineer and contractor to the London firm Christiani & Nielsen. He noted that his "place was in the office" during the project, and in retrospect deplored the cheapness and shoddiness of the materials and workmanship implemented by the firm. The building had been designed in 1932 for the tourists visiting the fast-growing island resort. The cafe was opened in 1933 as the Canvey Island Cafe but came to be known as the "Labworth Cafe" due to the large "Labworth" text – in reference to the "Labworth estate" within which the building is situated – painted around the inland facing third storey. The name "Labworth" is derived from the "Labworth farm" which the estate replaced in the early 20th century and has its origins in the Old english lobwerde: a compound of lobb; used as nickname for a spider, or meaning of heavy, clumsy mass, referring to soil, and werda meaning a low-lying marsh in the south east of England.

The decline in popularity of the English seaside holiday led to the Cafe's neglect, and the building narrowly escaped demolition during the major redevelopments of the island's sea defences 1973–1982. By the 1990s the cafe was in a state of disrepair, but it was awarded the status of a Grade II listing in 1996 by English Heritage and then bought in 1998 by local businessman and lottery winner Chris Topping. The Labworth was consequently refurbished, and reopened in the late 1990s with the first floor functioning as the Labworth Restaurant. In 2001, a cafe was added to the ground floor and the building reopened as the Labworth Restaurant and Beach Bistro.

=== Modifications ===
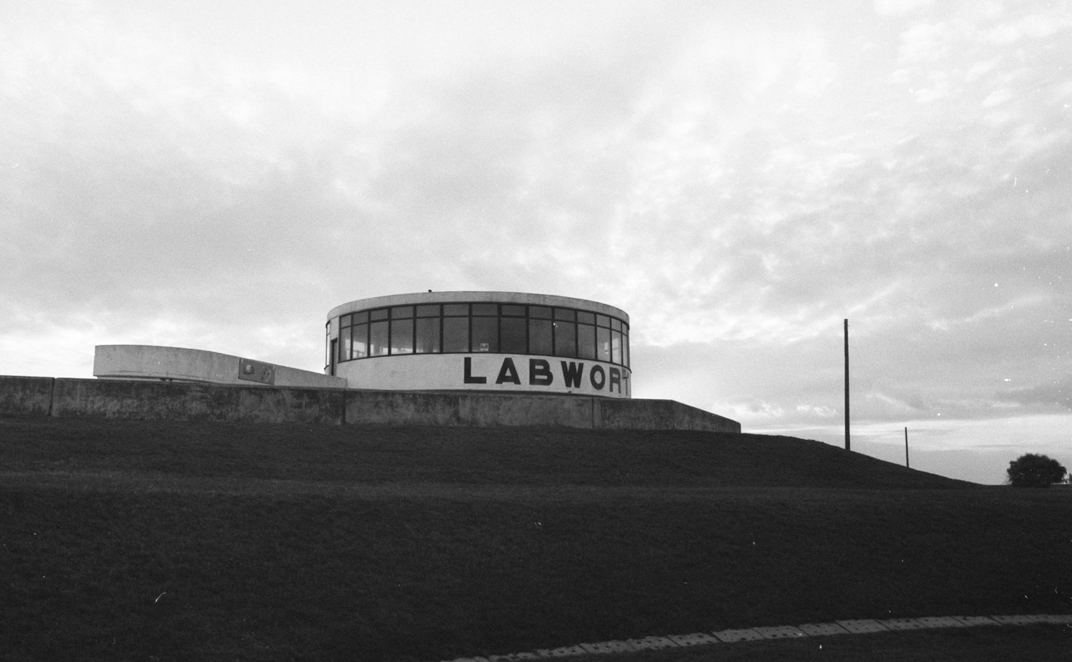
Viewed inland from the north east, the Labworth Cafe in 1996 with its heavy typographic style apparent on the first floor.

The first significant alterations to the building occurred in reaction to the flooding of Canvey Island in 1953 which claimed 58 lives. The flood prompted a succession of improvements to the sea defences around the perimeter of the island. The path of the new "second" seawall in 1953 followed the line of the promenade on the south side (beach side) of the cafe, but the larger replacement – completed in 1983 – was built around the cafe's north side (inland). The construction necessarily raised the ground on the north side to an equal level with the promenade on the south side (beach side) subsequently burying the cafe's supporting piles and essentially reducing the building's height to two storeys. The placement of the wall, its proximity and large scale also obscured the effect of the first floor over-hang, and the view of the central ground floor when seen from the north. However, the general appearance remained intact when viewed from the south until the building's second major alteration with the addition of the new cafe in 2001. The two arms that extend from the circular drum of the first floor originally enclosed two shelters on the ground floor but were transformed into an indoor serving and seating area.

==== Canopies ====
The construction of the original café included a group of thin steel columns which supported canopies on the access areas of the roofs of the shelters. At some point in the building's history these were removed.

==== Typography ====
In the refurbishment of the late 1990s, the large black condensed text of Labworth painted around the north side of the first floor was removed and replaced with a collection of metallic signs.

== See also ==
- Kingsgate Bridge
- Royal Corinthian Yacht Club
