= Canvey Lake =

Park in Essex, United Kingdom

Coordinates: 51.5273°N 0.5854°E

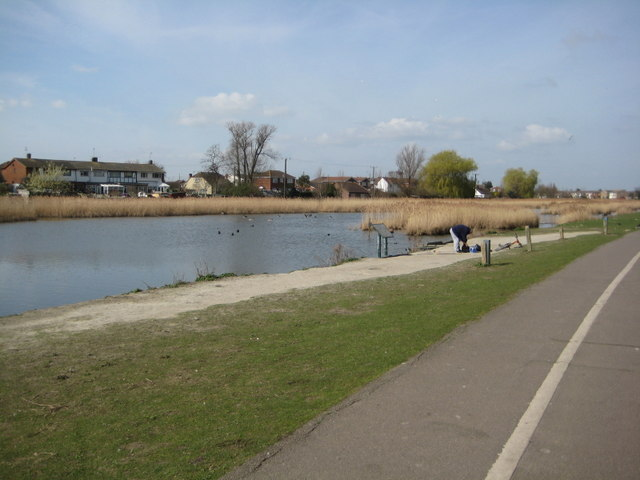
- Interactive map of Canvey Lake
- Type: Local Nature Reserve
- Location: Canvey Island, Essex
- OS grid: TQ 797 839
- Area: 8.3 hectares (21 acres)
- Manager: Castle Point Borough Council and Canvey Island Town Council

Canvey Lake is an 8.3 hectare Local Nature Reserve in Canvey Island in Essex. It is owned by Castle Point Borough Council and managed by the council together with Canvey Island Town Council.

On 1 March 2010 Canvey Island Town Council signed a 99-year lease with Castle Point Borough Council to run the site with a committee of two councillor from each council and an independent chairman. The Town Council sought extensive funds to carry out extensive works to remedy years of neglect and create recreation, fishing and wildlife areas. It was formerly a creek which has been converted to a lake by the building of a sea wall. Wildlife includes mallards, moorhens and water voles. A shingle bank has been created and reed beds cut back.

There is access from Denham Road.
