= Alexander Macbean =

Alexander Macbean (died 1784) was a British writer and amanuensis, known as a lexicographer.

== Life ==
Macbean worked as amanuensis for Ephraim Chambers; and then was one of the six amanuenses employed Johnson's Dictionary. About 1758 he obtained, through Samuel Johnson, the post of librarian to Archibald Campbell, 3rd Duke of Argyll.

On the duke's death in 1761, Macbean was left without income, and he became mainly dependent on charity. In 1775, when Macbean was starving, as his former colleague Peyton had already done, Johnson who found him unworldly gave him four guineas and collected more; and in 1780, through his influence with Lord Thurlow, obtained him admission as a poor brother to the London Charterhouse. There he died on 26 June 1784.

== Works ==
Macbean wrote:

- A Synopsis or short Analytical View of Chemistry (1743), translated from the German of Gottfried Rothe, a student of Georg Ernst Stahl.
- Dictionary of Ancient Geography (1773), preface by Johnson.
- A Dictionary of the Bible (1766).

He also compiled numerous indexes, including that to Johnson's edition of the English Poets.

== Notes ==
Attribution

This article incorporates text from a publication now in the public domain: Lee, Sidney, ed. (1893). "Macbean, Alexander". Dictionary of National Biography. Vol. 34. London: Smith, Elder & Co.
