= Ronald Jenkins =

British engineer

Ronald Stewart Jenkins (8 December 1907 – 27 December 1975) was a British civil engineer, known for designing the Mulberry Harbours in World War II, in 1944.

Jenkins was born in Sutton, London. From 1928 to 1931 he studied engineering at the City and Guilds College in London, part of Imperial College London.

He worked with the structural engineer Oscar Faber, and worked at Arup Group, of which he was one of four founders in 1949, becoming a senior partner. At Arup he worked as a concrete shell design engineer. He was known for his mathematical skill.

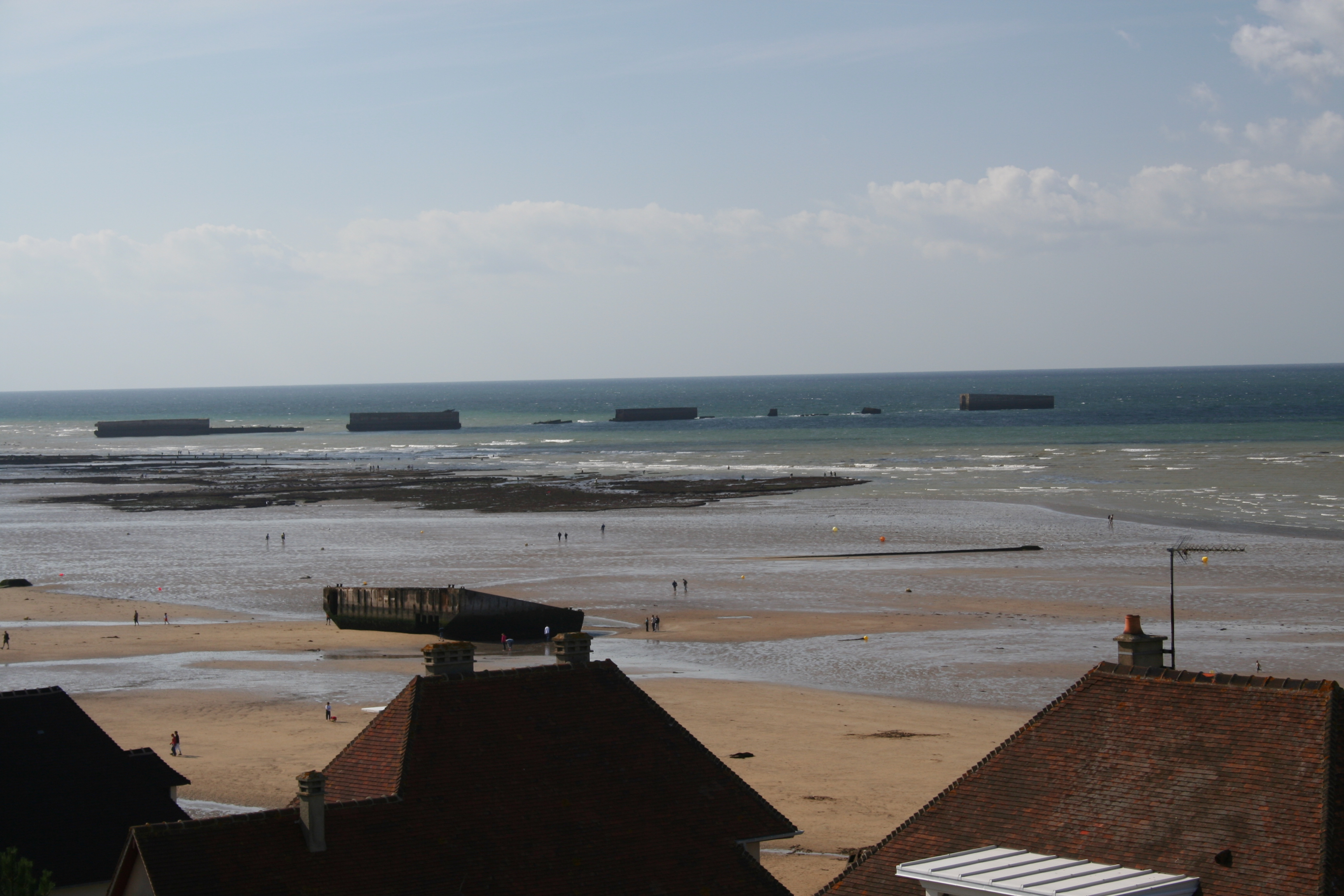
Mulberry harbours at Arromanches-les-Bains in August 2006

He worked with Ove Arup to design the Mulberry harbours. There was a memorial service for him on Friday 6 February 1976 at St Peter, Vere Street on Vere Street, Westminster.

== Works ==
- Brynmawr Rubber Factory
