= Solar Fire =

Studio album by Manfred Mann's Earth Band
- Released: 30 November 1973
- Recorded: 1973
- Studios: The Workhouse, Old Kent Road, London
- Genres: Hard rock; progressive rock; jazz rock
- Length: 37:10
- Labels: Bronze (UK); Polydor (U.S.)
- Producers: Manfred Mann, Earth Band

Manfred Mann's Earth Band chronology
Messin' (1973)	Solar Fire (1973)	The Good Earth (1974)

Singles from Solar Fire
- 1. "Father of Day, Father of Night" Released: February 1974

Solar Fire is the fourth studio album by Manfred Mann's Earth Band, released in 1973. It spent 15 weeks on the Billboard 200 charts, peaking at number 96 on 11 May 1974. It was initially intended to be a full adaptation of The Planets suite but Gustav Holst's heir, who had previously given permission for the adaptation of "Jupiter, the Bringer of Jollity" in the hit single "Joybringer", did not allow this to happen, so the band made their own "cosmic" album using mostly original themes, although the most well-known song is the (greatly reworked) Bob Dylan composition "Father of Day, Father of Night", which is in the Earth Band's live set to this day and remains a popular song on rock radio. "Pluto the Dog" (a play on the Disney character) and the two-part "Saturn, Lord of the Ring/Mercury, the Winged Messenger" are instrumentals, and "Earth the Circle Part 2" features only two lines of sung vocals. The album is often considered to be the peak of the early Earth Band line-up and, for a lot of progressive rock reviewers, the pinnacle of Mann's career in general.

Professional ratings
Review scores
Source	Rating
AllMusic	4/5 stars
Christgau's Record Guide	C+
Disc	4/4 stars
The Encyclopedia of Popular Music	3/5 stars
Melody Maker	favourable
Record Mirror	favourable
Rolling Stone	mixed
The Rolling Stone Album Guide	2/5 stars

== Track listing ==
Side one

1. "Father of Day, Father of Night" (Bob Dylan) – 9:55 (Note: This piece incorporates a slowly building volume pedal guitar solo previously played live as part of the song "Dealer", which itself was a new version of the song "Prayer" from the first MMEB album.)
2. "In the Beginning, Darkness" (Manfred Mann, Mick Rogers, Chris Slade) – 5:22
3. "Pluto the Dog" (Mann, Rogers, Slade, Colin Pattenden) – 2:48

Side two

1. "Solar Fire" (Mann, Rogers, Slade, Pattenden) – 5:15
2. "Saturn, Lord of the Ring/Mercury, The Winged Messenger" (Note: this piece is based on the track "Fish", recorded by Manfred Mann's previous line-up Manfred Mann Chapter Three in 1971. The album was shelved before release. So, this track was first released in 2005 as a part of the box set Odds & Sods – Mis-takes & Out-takes.) (Mann/Mann, Rogers) – 6:31
3. "Earth, The Circle Part 2" (Mann) – 3:23
4. "Earth, The Circle Part 1" (Debussy/Mann) – 3:56

Bonus Tracks (1998 re-issue)

8. "Joybringer" (Gustav Holst, Mann, Rogers, Slade) – 3:25
9. "Father of Day, Father of Night" (Edited version) (Dylan) – 3:03 (Note: This edit was newly created from the LP master for the 1998 CD, because a master for the original single edit couldn't be found. The proper 7" version later appeared on the CDs "The Best of Manfred Mann's Earth Band Re-Mastered Volume II" and "Mannthology")

The track listing varied from area to area. The US edition omitted the final track "Earth, the Circle Part 1" but included "Joybringer" before "Earth, the Circle Part 2". "Joybringer" had been released as a non-album single in 1973.

== Personnel ==
The Earth Band

- Manfred Mann – organ, Mellotron, Minimoog synthesiser, vocals on "Earth, the Circle Part 1"
- Mick Rogers – guitar, vocals
- Colin Pattenden – bass guitar
- Chris Slade – drums

Additional musicians

- Irene Chanter – backing vocals
- Doreen Chanter – backing vocals
- Grove Singers – backing vocals
- Paul Rutherford – trombone
- Peter Miles – additional percussion on "In the Beginning, Darkness"

Technical

- Manfred Mann's Earth Band – producer
- John Pantry – engineer
- Dave Stephens, John Edwards – assistant engineers
- Laurence Latham – tape operator
- Fin Costello – design, photography
- Re-mastered by: Robert M Corich and Mike Brown

== Charts ==
Chart (1973−1974)	Peak position
Canada Top Albums/CDs (RPM)	96
US Billboard 200	96

== Certifications ==
Region	Certification	Certified units/sales
United Kingdom (BPI)	Silver	60,000^{^}
^{^} Shipments figures based on certification alone.
