= The Roaring Silence =

1976 studio album by Manfred Mann's Earth Band

Studio album by Manfred Mann's Earth Band
- Released: 27 August 1976
- Recorded: 1976
- Studios: Workhouse Studios, London
- Genres: Progressive rock; art rock
- Length: 39:55
- Labels: Bronze; Warner Bros.
- Producer: Manfred Mann's Earth Band

Manfred Mann's Earth Band chronology
Nightingales and Bombers (1975)	The Roaring Silence (1976)	Watch (1978)

Singles from The Roaring Silence
- 1. "Blinded by the Light" Released: 6 August 1976; 2. "Questions" Released: November 1976

Professional ratings
Review scores
Source	Rating
AllMusic	4/5 stars
Christgau's Record Guide	C
The Encyclopedia of Popular Music	4/5 stars
Melody Maker	unrated
MusicHound Rock	3/5 stars
Record Mirror	favourable
Rolling Stone	favourable
The Rolling Stone Album Guide	2/5 stars
Sounds	favourable

The Roaring Silence is the seventh studio album by English rock band Manfred Mann's Earth Band. It was released on 27 August 1976, by Bronze Records in the UK and by Warner Bros. Records in the US. Like other Earth Band albums, this includes material by other composers. "Blinded by the Light", which reached number one on the Billboard Hot 100, is a cover version of a song by Bruce Springsteen; "Questions" is based on the main theme of Franz Schubert's Impromptu in G flat Major (1827); "Starbird" takes its theme from Igor Stravinsky's ballet The Firebird (1910); and "The Road to Babylon" is based on the canon "By the Waters of Babylon" by Philip Hayes. Lyrics and melody of the intro of "The Road to Babylon" is taken from the song "Babylon" from Don McLean's second album, American Pie, released in 1971.

This album marked the arrival of vocalist/guitarist Chris Hamlet Thompson, and Dave Flett, who replaced longtime guitarist/vocalist/composer Mick Rogers. It is also the last album recorded with founding member Colin Pattenden.

The instrumental track "Waiter, There's a Yawn in My Ear" is based on a live recording (with studio overdubs added later). The album's cover art is a visualization of this track's title. Its main riff is taken from the Manfred Mann Chapter Three track "Fish", which was recorded for their abandoned third album. It was ultimately released in 2005 on the Odds & Sods – Mis-takes & Out-takes box set.

Nightingales & Bombers was released, and when Chris [Thompson] and I joined we'd done an American tour without recording. I remember, on tour, we did a few tracks from the Nightingales & Bombers album, including "Spirit in the Night." We also did "Father of Day, Father of Night," and a couple of the newer ones, what would wind up on The Roaring Silence, to see how they went down.

— Dave Flett, Prog Rock FAQ: All That's Left to Know About Rock's Most Progressive Music

== Track listing ==
Side one
No.	Title	Writer(s)	Length
1.	"Blinded by the Light"	Bruce Springsteen	7:08
2.	"Singing the Dolphin Through"	Mike Heron	8:19
3.	"Waiter, There's a Yawn in My Ear"	Manfred Mann	5:39

Side two
No.	Title	Writer(s)	Length
4.	"The Road to Babylon"	Mann, Peter Thomas, Colin Pattenden	6:53
5.	"This Side of Paradise"	Mann, Thomas, Pattenden	4:47
6.	"Starbird"	Stravinsky, Mann, Chris Slade	3:09
7.	"Questions"	Franz Schubert (Impromptus G-flat Major), Mann, Slade	4:00

1998 re-issue bonus tracks
No.	Title	Writer(s)	Length
8.	"Spirit in the Night" (1977 version)	Springsteen	3:16
9.	"Blinded by the Light" (single edit)	Springsteen	3:49

Two pressings of this album were available in the US: the original, shown here, and a reissue from 1977 with a blue cover which included "Spirit In The Night", another Springsteen song which had previously been released on Nightingales & Bombers and was now re-recorded with Chris Thompson taking lead vocals, between "The Road to Babylon" and "This Side of Paradise". The first CD release (1987) of this album did not contain bonus tracks, and tracks 3 and 7 had changed places.

The 1998 remastered release of the album had the Chris Thompson version of "Spirit In The Night" appended to the original album sequencing as well as the single edit of "Blinded By The Light".

== Personnel ==
The Earth Band

- Chris Hamlet Thompson – lead vocals, rhythm guitar
- Manfred Mann – keyboards, backing vocals, lead vocals on the final verse of “Blinded by the Light”
- Dave Flett – lead guitar
- Colin Pattenden – bass
- Chris Slade – drums, backing vocals, percussion

Additional musicians

- Doreen Chanter – backing vocals
- Irene Chanter – backing vocals
- Suzanne Lynch – backing vocals
- Mick Rogers – backing vocals
- Barbara Thompson – saxophone
- David Millman – string arrangements

Technical

- Manfred Mann's Earth Band – producers
- Laurence Latham – engineer
- David Culpan, Margaret Wood, Tony Rowell, Edwin Cross – assistant engineers
- Shirtsleeve Studio – design. Modelled by artist Derek Goldsmith
- Martyn Goddard – photography
- Re-mastered by: Robert M Corich and Mike Brown

== Charts ==
=== Weekly charts ===
Chart (1976–1977)	Peak position
Australian Albums (Kent Music Report)	8
Austrian Albums (Ö3 Austria)	10
Canada Top Albums/CDs (RPM)	6
Dutch Albums (Album Top 100)	11
German Albums (Offizielle Top 100)	26
New Zealand Albums (RMNZ)	34
Norwegian Albums (VG-lista)	6
Swedish Albums (Sverigetopplistan)	17
UK Albums (Official Charts)	10
US Billboard 200	10

=== Year-end charts ===
Chart (1977)	Position
Canada Top Albums/CDs (RPM)	45
US Billboard 200	99

== Certifications ==
Region	Certification	Certified units/sales
United Kingdom (BPI)	Silver	60,000^{^}
United States (RIAA)	Gold	500,000^{^}
^{^} Shipments figures based on certification alone.
