= Manfred Mann (disambiguation) =

Manfred Mann were an English rock band active between 1962 and 1969.

Manfred Mann may also refer to:

- Manfred Mann (musician), a musician who is a founding member of the band Manfred Mann

== See also ==
- Manfred Mann Chapter Three, a later band, active from 1970 to 1971, also founded by Manfred Mann
- Manfred Mann's Earth Band, another later band, active from 1971 to present, also founded by Manfred Mann
- Manfred man, an additional baseball runner allowed in extra innings, named for the MLB commissioner who introduced the rule
