= Nightingales & Bombers =

Studio album by Manfred Mann's Earth Band
- Released: 22 August 1975
- Recorded: 1975
- Studio: The Workhouse, Old Kent Road, London
- Genre: Hard rock; progressive rock; art rock
- Length: 37:57
- Label: Bronze (UK); Warner Bros. (U.S.)
- Producer: Manfred Mann, Earth Band

Manfred Mann's Earth Band chronology
The Good Earth (1974)	Nightingales & Bombers (1975)	The Roaring Silence (1976)

Singles from Nightingales & Bombers
- 1. "Spirits in the Night" Released: 25 July 1975 (UK)

Professional ratings
Review scores
Source	Rating
AllMusic	4/5 stars
Christgau's Record Guide	B+
Creem	unrated
Disc	3/4 stars
Encyclopedia of Popular Music	3/5 stars
Record Mirror	mixed
Rolling Stone	unfavourable
The Rolling Stone Album Guide	2/5 stars

Nightingales & Bombers is the sixth studio album released by Manfred Mann's Earth Band in 1975.

The title of this album was inspired by a recording made in Surrey, England during the Second World War, by an ornithologist intending to record nightingales. The bombers flew over at the same time and were recorded by accident. The recording has been incorporated in 'As Above, So Below'.

— Manfred Mann 1975

The recording was made on 19 May 1942 by a sound engineer for the BBC. Intending to capture the nightingale's song he also, by accident, recorded the sound of RAF bombers on their way to attack Mannheim, Germany. In that raid 197 planes were dispatched and 12 were lost.

This was the last album to feature guitarist and original lead vocalist Mick Rogers until he returned for 1986's Criminal Tango.

== Track listing ==
=== Side one ===
1. "Spirits in the Night" (Bruce Springsteen) – 6:29
2. "Countdown" (Manfred Mann) – 3:05
3. "Time Is Right" (Mann, Chris Slade, Mick Rogers) – 6:32
4. "Crossfade" (Manfred Mann, Chris Slade, Mick Rogers, Colin Pattenden) – 3:38

=== Side two ===
5. "Visionary Mountains" (Pam Nestor, Joan Armatrading) – 5:38
6. "Nightingales and Bombers" (Mick Rogers) – 4:45(*)
7. "Fat Nelly" (Manfred Mann, Peter Thomas) – 3:20
8. "As Above So Below" (Recorded Live) (Manfred Mann, Chris Slade, Mick Rogers, Colin Pattenden) – 4:16

=== Bonus tracks on 1999 CD re-issue ===
9. "Quit Your Low Down Ways" (from US Release) (Bob Dylan) – 3:25
10. "Spirits in the Night" (single version) (Bruce Springsteen) – 3:17

(*) The US version of the album includes "Quit Your Low Down Ways" as the second track on side two, which was not part of the original UK album. This song was recorded at the behest of the US record label, who were concerned that the album didn't contain enough songs with vocals (on the original UK LP, every second track is an instrumental, aside from one faintly heard line in the title track and some backing vocals on "As Above So Below").

"As Above So Below" is edited from a jam session that the band played in the middle of a 16-minute live version of "Mighty Quinn", recorded at the Marquee in London on 18 December 1973. This recording was then overdubbed with sound effects such as the aforementioned nightingales and bombers and reversed female vocals.

== Personnel ==
The Earth Band

- Manfred Mann – Hammond organ, synthesisers
- Mick Rogers – guitars, vocals
- Colin Pattenden – bass
- Chris Slade – drums, percussion

Additional musicians

- Ruby James, Doreen Chanter, Martha Smith – backing vocals
- David Millman – viola
- Chris Warren-Green – violin
- Nigel Warren-Green – cello
- Graham Elliott – cello
- David Boswell-Brown – cello

Technical

- Manfred Mann's Earth Band – producers
- Laurence Latham – engineer
- Lilian Bron – photography
- Dave Field – sleeve
- Re-mastered by: Robert M Corich and Mike Brown

== Charts ==
Chart (1975)	Peak position
Dutch Albums (Album Top 100)	20
Finnish Albums (The Official Finnish Charts)	23
German Albums (Offizielle Top 100)	49
Norwegian Albums (VG-lista)	10
US Billboard 200	120
