= The Best of Manfred Mann's Earth Band Re-Mastered =

The Best Of Manfred Mann's Earth Band Re-Mastered

Greatest hits album by Manfred Mann's Earth Band
- Released: 4 October 1999
- Recorded: 1972–1998
- Genres: Rock; Hard rock Progressive rock
- Length: 78:48
- Label: Cohesion
- Producer: Manfred Mann

Manfred Mann's Earth Band chronology
| Mann Alive (1998) | The Best Of Manfred Mann's Earth Band Re-Mastered (1999) | The Best Of Manfred Mann's Earth Band Re-Mastered Volume II (2001) |

Professional ratings
Review scores
| Source | Rating |
|---|---|
| Allmusic | (not rated) |

The Best Of Manfred Mann's Earth Band Re-Mastered is a compilation album released in 1999 by Manfred Mann's Earth Band. The title of track 4 on the compilation, "Blinded by the Light" is errantly printed as "Blinded by the Night".

== Track listing ==
1. "Living Without You" (Randy Newman) – 3:37
2. "Joybringer" (single version) (Gustav Holst, Manfred Mann, Mick Rogers, Chris Slade) – 3:24
3. "Be Not Too Hard" (single version) (Christopher Logue, Rogers) – 3:35
4. "Spirits in the Night" (Bruce Springsteen) – 6:27
5. "Blinded by the Light" (single version) (Springsteen) – 3:49
6. "Questions" (single version) (Mann, Slade) – 3:58
7. "Davy's On The Road Again" (single version) (John Simon, Robbie Robertson) – 3:38
8. "Mighty Quinn" (single version) (Bob Dylan) – 3:36
9. "California" (single version) (Mike Vickers) – 3:46
10. "You Angel You" (single version) (Dylan) – 3:47
11. "Don't Kill It Carol" (Mike Heron) – 6:17
12. "For You" (single version) (Springsteen) – 3:52
13. "Lies" (Denny Newman) – 4:37
14. "Demolition Man" (single version) (Gordon Sumner) – 3:46
15. "Runner" (single version) (Ian Thomas) – 4:39
16. "Somewhere In Africa" (Trad arr Mann, John Lingwood) – 1:39
17. "Redemption Song" (live) (Bob Marley) – 3:15
18. "Going Underground" (single version) (Paul Weller) – 5:44
19. "Banquet" (Joni Mitchell) – 5:19

== Personnel ==
- Manfred Mann − keyboards, vocals
- With various Manfred Mann's Earth Band members 1972−1998
- Re-mastered by: Robert M Corich and Mike Brown
- Compilation by Andy Taylor

== Charts ==
| Chart (1999) | Peak position |
|---|---|
| German Albums (Offizielle Top 100) | 82 |
