= The Best of Manfred Mann's Earth Band Re-Mastered Volume II =

The Best Of Manfred Mann's Earth Band Re-Mastered Volume II

Greatest hits album by Manfred Mann's Earth Band
- Released: 2001
- Recorded: 1972–2000
- Genre: Rock; Hard rock Progressive rock
- Length: 79:39
- Label: Cohesion
- Producer: Manfred Mann

Manfred Mann's Earth Band chronology
The Best Of Manfred Mann's Earth Band Re-Mastered (1999)	The Best Of Manfred Mann's Earth Band Re-Mastered Volume II (2001)	2006 (2004)

Professional ratings
Review scores
Source	Rating
Allmusic	3.5/5 stars

The Best Of Manfred Mann's Earth Band Re-Mastered Volume II is a compilation album released in 2001 by Manfred Mann's Earth Band.

== Track listing ==
1. "The Times They Are a-Changin'" (live) (Bob Dylan) – 6:30
2. "Eyes Of Nostradamus" (7" single) (Al Stewart) – 3:37
3. "Shelter from the Storm" (Dylan) – 6:05
4. "Time Is Right" (6:32) (Manfred Mann, Chris Slade, Mick Rogers) – 6:32
5. "Tribal Statistics" (single) (Andy Qunta) – 3:35
6. "I (Who Have Nothing)" (single) (Jerry Leiber, Mike Stoller) – 4:12
7. "Man In A Jam" (Mann) – 2:10
8. "Martha's Madman" (Lane Tietgen) – 4:51
9. "Father Of Day, Father Of Night" (single) (Dylan) – 3:05
10. "Tumbling Ball" (single) (Mark Spiro) – 3:59
11. "Meat" (Mann) – 3:14
12. "It's All Over Now, Baby Blue" (single) (Dylan) – 3:06
13. "Black and Blue" (Chain: Barry Sullivan, Matt Taylor, Phil Manning, Barry Harvey) – 7:20
14. "Tribute" (single) (Mann) – 4:09
15. "Do Anything You Wanna Do" (12" single) (Graham Douglas, Edwin Hollis) – 6:27
16. "Singing The Dolphin Through" (Mike Heron) – 8:16
17. "Joybringer" (1987 version) (Gustav Holst, Mann, Rogers, Slade) – 2:29

== Personnel ==
- Manfred Mann − keyboards, vocals
- With various Manfred Mann's Earth Band members 1972−2000
- Re-mastered by: Robert M Corich and Mike Brown
- Compilation by Andy Taylor
