= John Trotter (drummer) =

Drummer

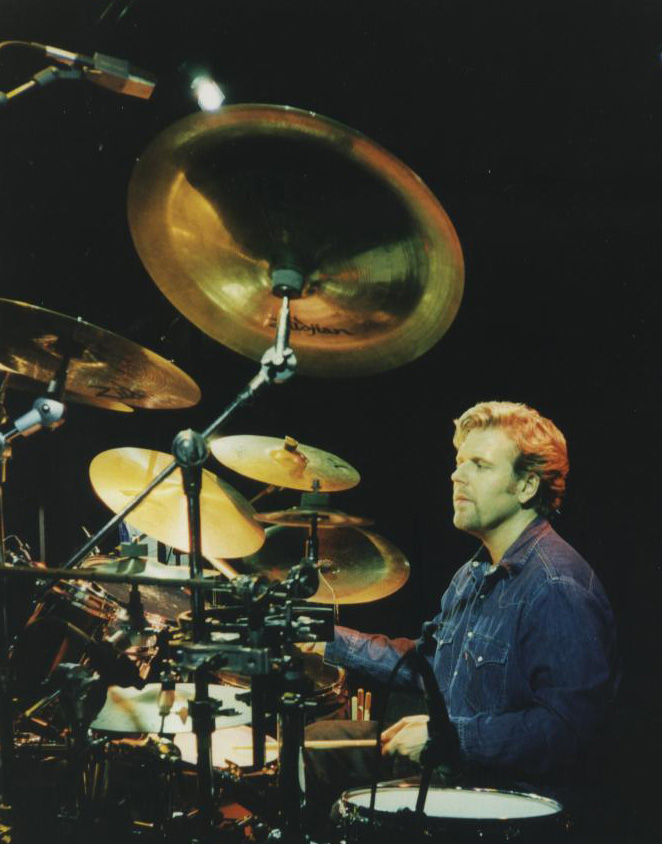
Trotter in 2008

John Trotter (born 1966, Newcastle Upon Tyne, England) is an English and Australian drummer.

He began playing the drums aged 11. He studied with Barry Black at Ronnie's Drum Shop and made his first recordings in the shops basement studio aged 14. He became a full-time professional on leaving school at 16 with The Don Smith Band at Newcastle’s Mayfair Ballroom. After playing many cabaret clubs, cruise ships and summer seasons, he moved to London in 1985.

Initially playing with The Andy Ross Orchestra, John became a respected member of the ‘Session Community’ covering all aspects of the music industry, accompanying artists such as Robbie Williams, Hot Chocolate, Cliff Richard, The Corrs, Georgie Fame, Ruby Turner, Colin Blunstone, Chris Thompson & Stevie Lange, Barbara Dickson, The Drifters, Robert Hart, James Belushi, Tony Burrows, The Three Degrees, Chris Farlowe, Jimmy Barnes, Dame Edna Everage and Rolf Harris, toured with The Peter Green Splinter Group and The Moody Marsden Band (featuring original Whitesnake guitarists Micky Moody and Bernie Marsden).

He has recorded numerous film and TV soundtracks including Spitting Image, Not the Nine O'Clock News, The Fast Show, Gimme Gimme Gimme, TFI Friday, Kevin & Perry Go Large, The Search for John Gissing (starring Alan Rickman), also jingles for companies such as McDonald's, KFC, British Telecom, Cadbury, Gillette, Heineken, Martini, Vauxhall Cars and Fuji (Mr Bean series).

In 1996, Trotter became a member of Manfred Mann's Earth Band for the Soft Vengeance Tour. MMEB recorded with him the live album Mann Alive. In the spring of 2000 he left the band.

Upon leaving MMEB, John joined the reformed Prog Rock band Greenslade. The lineup consisted of founding members Dave Greenslade (keys / composer), Tony Reeves (bass), Trotter (drums) and ex-Asia keyboard player / vocalist John Young. A live album titled '2001 Live - Full Edition' was released in 2002.

In 2002, Trotter relocated to Australia and became an Australian Citizen in 2007.

He performed with Michelle Shocked, Joe Camilleri, Lucy Durack, John Meyer, Eugene Bridges, Lucky Oceans & Friends, Claire Clarke, Blanche DuBois, The Zydecats, Matt Taylor, Rachel Claudio, Rachael Beck & Todd McKenney, Troy Roberts, The Paperdolls, Ryan Webb, Ben Witt and Luke Steele (Empire of the Sun).

He continues to develop his Drum School and has written three educational books, The Working Drummer (2013), Beats & Pieces (2014) and The Junior Drummer's Bible (2018), all published by the German company AMA Verlag.

The Junior Drummer's Bible won a 'Best Edition' award at the Frankfurt Musikmesse 2019.
