= Somewhere in Afrika =

Studio album by Manfred Mann's Earth Band
- Released: October 1982 (Germany); 18 February 1983 (UK)
- Recorded: 1981–1982
- Studios: Mastersounds; Underhill, London
- Genres: Rock; hard rock; progressive rock
- Length: 37:22
- Labels: Bronze (UK original release); Cohesion (UK 1999 reissue); Arista (U.S.)
- Producer: Manfred Mann

Manfred Mann's Earth Band chronology
Chance (1980)	Somewhere in Afrika (1982)	Budapest Live (1984)

Singles from Somewhere in Afrika
- 1. "Eyes of Nostradamus" Released: 12 March 1982; 2. "Redemption Song (No Kwazulu)" Released: July 1982; 3. "Tribal Statistics" Released: November 1982; 4. "Demolition Man" Released: January 1983

Professional ratings
Review scores
Source	Rating
AllMusic	3.0/5 stars
The Encyclopedia of Popular Music	3/5 stars
Musikexpress	4/5 stars

Somewhere in Afrika is the eleventh album by Manfred Mann's Earth Band, released in 1982. It is their last studio album recorded for their long time record label Bronze Records. They would record their next studio album, Criminal Tango for Virgin Records. Bassist Matt Irving joined the band, replacing Pat King for this album.

== Track listing ==
=== UK version ===
==== Side one ====
1. "Tribal Statistics" (Andy Qunta) – 4:16
2. "Eyes of Nostradamus" (Al Stewart) – 3:28
3. "Third World Service" (Anthony Moore) – 5:18
4. "Demolition Man" (Sting) – 3:45
5. "Brothers and Sisters of Azania" (Manfred Mann) – 2:46

==== Side two ====
1. "Africa Suite" (Mann, Matt Irving, John Lingwood) – 8:36
  a) "Brothers and Sisters of Africa" (Mann) – 3:06
  b) "To Bantustan?" (Mann) – 2:36
  c) "Koze Kobenini? (How Long Must We Wait?)" (Mann, Irving) – 1:26
  d) "Lalela" (Mann, Lingwood) – 1:31
2. "Redemption Song (No Kwazulu)" (Bob Marley) – 7:35
3. "Somewhere in Africa" (Traditional; arranged by Mann and Lingwood) – 1:38

==== Bonus Tracks (1999 CD re-issue) ====
9. "War Dream" (Mann, Lingwood, Steve Waller, Irving, Shona Laing) – 3:08
10. "Holiday's Dream" (Mann, Irving, Lingwood, Waller) – 2:40
11. "Redemption Song" (single version) (Bob Marley) – 4:14
12. "Eyes of Nostradamus" (12" single version) (Stewart) – 4:42
13. "Demolition Man" (single version/alternate mix) (Sumner) – 3:44

=== US version ===
The North American version of Somewhere in Afrika was reordered, and was substantially different from the European version. Several tracks were added, while others were altered or edited.

Added to the line-up were the songs "Runner" (the band's final Top 40 hit in the US to date) and "Rebel". "Runner" was included in the soundtracks of the films, The Philadelphia Experiment (1984) and Firstborn (1984). "Africa Suite" was altered to feature a completely different final section called "Brothers and Sisters of Azania" (which had appeared as a separate track on the European LP); the original final section of the suite (known as "Lalela") now appeared as a separate track earlier in the album's running order. Finally, the track "Redemption Song" was cut by over 3 minutes.

The label One Way Records added the original UK LP versions of "Third World Service" and "Redemption Song" to a CD reissue.

In the later program of MMEB remasters, "Runner" and "Rebel" were included on the 1999 reissue of "Criminal Tango".

==== Side one ====
1. "Demolition Man" (Sting) – 3:40
2. "Runner" (Ian Thomas) – 4:40
3. "Rebel" (Reg Laws) – 3:52
4. "Eyes of Nostradamus" (Stewart) – 3:28
5. "Third World Service" (Moore) – 3:24

==== Side two ====
1. "Somewhere in Africa" (Trad arr Mann, Lingwood) – 1:38
2. "Tribal Statistics" (Qunta) – 4:16
3. "Lalela" (Mann, Lingwood) – 1:31
4. "Redemption Song (No Kwazulu)" (Bob Marley) – 4:11
5. "Africa Suite" (Mann, Irving, Lingwood) – 9:54
  a) "Brothers and Sisters of Africa" (Mann) – 3:06
  b) "To Bantustan?" (Mann) – 2:36
  c) "Koze Kobenini? (How Long Must We Wait?)" (Mann, Irving) – 1:26
  d) "Brothers and Sisters of Azania" (Mann) – 2:46

==== Bonus Tracks (One Way Records CD re-issue) ====
11. "Third World Service" (long version) (Moore) – 5:17
12. "Redemption Song" (long version) (Bob Marley) – 7:35

=== Original CD version ===
The first CD release includes the tracks from the original UK LP, but in a very different sequence. Later reissues reverted to the original UK LP tracklisting. On the 1999 re-issue, "Africa Suite" is one track, whereas on the later remaster (from the 40th Anniversary Box Set and released as a standalone CD in 2016), all the sections have separate index tracks. The tracks "Runner" and "Rebel" were appended to the 1999 remaster of Criminal Tango with the explanation "Although recorded for the U.S. 'Somewhere in Afrika' album, these two songs feature the return of Mick Rogers and fit more into the 'Tango' period than the Afrika one."

1. "Redemption Song (No Kwazulu)" (Bob Marley) – 7:35
2. "Somewhere in Africa" (Traditional; arranged by Mann and Lingwood) – 1:38
3. "Tribal Statistics" (Andy Qunta) – 4:16
4. "Africa Suite" (Mann, Matt Irving, John Lingwood) – 8:36
  a) "Brothers and Sisters of Africa" (Mann) – 3:06
  b) "To Bantustan?" (Mann) – 2:36
  c) "Koze Kobenini? (How Long Must We Wait?)" (Mann, Irving) – 1:26
  d) "Lalela" (Mann, Lingwood) – 1:31
5. "Eyes of Nostradamus" (Al Stewart) – 3:28
6. "Demolition Man" (Sting) – 3:45
7. "Third World Service" (Anthony Moore) – 5:18
8. "Brothers and Sisters of Azania" (Manfred Mann) – 2:46

== Personnel ==
Musicians

- Manfred Mann – keyboards, synthesisers, vocals ("Brothers and Sisters of Azania" and its reprise in the 7 minute version of "Redemption Song")
- John Lingwood – drums, percussion
- Steve Waller – vocals, guitar ("Eyes of Nostradamus", "Third World Service", "Demolition Man" and "To Bantustan?")
- Chris Thompson – vocals ("Runner", "Tribal Statistics", "Brothers and Sisters of Africa" and "Redemption Song")
- Matt Irving – bass, programming (MC4)
- Shona Laing – vocals
- Trevor Rabin – lead guitar on "Redemption Song", guitar solo on "Runner"
- Mick Rogers – guitar, backing vocals on "Runner"

African vocals recorded in London Chief Dawethi, Fats Mothya, Jabu Mbalu, Rufus Sefothuma, Zanty Lekau

Technical

- Manfred Mann – producer
- Lars Finnstrom – engineer
- Terry Medhurst – engineer
- Martin Poole – cover art
- Re-mastered by: Robert M Corich and Mike Brown

== Charts ==
Chart (1982−1983)	Peak position
German Albums (Offizielle Top 100)	8
Norwegian Albums (VG-lista)	8
Swedish Albums (Sverigetopplistan)	14
UK Albums (Official Charts)	87
US Billboard 200	40
