= Runner (song) =

1981 single by Ian Thomas

Single by Manfred Mann's Earth Band

from the album Somewhere in Afrika
- B-side: "No Transkei"
- Released: 1984
- Recorded: 1981–82
- Studio: Mastersounds Underhill Studio, London
- Genre: Progressive rock; soft rock; pop rock
- Length: 4:40
- Label: Bronze (UK original release); Cohesion (UK 1999 reissue); Arista (U.S.)
- Songwriter: Ian Thomas
- Producer: Manfred Mann

Manfred Mann's Earth Band singles chronology
"Demolition Man" (1983)	"Runner" (1984)	"Do Anything You Wanna Do" (1986)

"The Runner", also called simply "Runner", is a song written by Canadian rock musician Ian Thomas and released in 1981 on his album of the same name. Inspired by the story of Terry Fox, "The Runner" was covered by French singer Sheila later that year, but its most famous rendition was recorded by Manfred Mann's Earth Band, a British band known for making hits of reworked cover songs, and released as a single in 1984, shortly before that year's Summer Olympics. The timing of the Manfred Mann's Earth Band version made it a success, and it reached number 22 on the Billboard Hot 100 in the United States.

== Ian Thomas's version ==
Thomas was inspired to write "The Runner" by the story of Canadian athlete Terry Fox. Fox, who lost a leg to cancer, attempted to run with his prosthetic leg from the east coast of Canada in Newfoundland and Labrador to the west coast in British Columbia, but was forced to stop in Ontario due to medical concerns when cancer was discovered in both of his lungs; he died in 1981. Thomas said that in writing the song, he "wanted to capture that gallantry, the importance of passing on the flame".

His version was included in The Terry Fox Story, a 1983 docudrama about Fox. It was also featured in the 2005 television biopic of Fox, Terry.

== Manfred Mann's Earth Band version ==
The song was included on the American release of the band’s album Somewhere in Afrika (1984). For the 1998 series of remastered reissues, the song was instead appended to the reissue of Criminal Tango. It was also included on the compilations The Best of Manfred Mann's Earth Band Re-Mastered, Odds & Sods – Mis-takes & Out-takes, the Leftovers disc of the 40th Anniversary box set and the deluxe edition of the 50th anniversary collection Mannthology. The single edit, which fades early, is rarer on CD, and was only reissued on The Complete Greatest Hits of Manfred Mann and Mannthology.

Trevor Rabin, at that time the guitarist of the progressive rock band Yes, played the guitar solo on this track.

The timing of the release of Manfred Mann's Earth Band version, just before the 1984 Summer Olympics in Los Angeles, prompted especially heavy play. The video for this version, directed by Lindsey Clennell, also received heavy airplay on MTV. In it, the band performs near a campfire at night (shot on a soundstage), interspersed with video of runners racing or carrying the Olympic flame, much of which was footage shot for the Summer Olympics in 1972 and 1976. A 12-second sequence focused on American sprinter Robert Taylor and the 100 metres in Munich.

This version of the song was used in the movie The Philadelphia Experiment (1984).

=== Track listing ===
- 7" single

A. "Runner" (7" version) – 3:50
B. "No Transkei" 2:35

- 12" single

A. "Runner" (12" version) – 4:40
B. "No Transkei" 2:35
C. "Lies (Through the 80s)" 4:34

Both B-sides are taken from the Budapest Live concerts, although "No Transkei" (re-titled second part of the "Africa Suite") was originally only available on the cassette of the album. US releases retained the title "Where Do They Send Them", which had already been used on the Budapest Live cassette. (The studio recording was called "To Bantustan?")

Chart (1983–1984)	Peak position
Canada RPM	34
U.S. Billboard Hot 100	22

=== Personnel ===
==== Musicians ====
- Manfred Mann – keyboards, synthesizers
- John Lingwood – drums, percussion
- Chris Thompson – vocals
- Matt Irving – bass, programming (MC4)
- Mick Rogers – backup vocals
- Trevor Rabin – guitar solo

==== Technical ====
- Manfred Mann – producer
- Lars Finnstrom – engineer
- Terry Medhurst – engineer
