= Glorified Magnified =

Studio album by Manfred Mann's Earth Band
- Released: 29 September 1972
- Recorded: 1972
- Studio: Maximum Sound, London
- Genre: Hard rock; progressive rock; jazz rock
- Length: 38:15
- Label: Philips (UK Original release); Bronze (UK Reissue); Polydor (U.S.)
- Producer: Manfred Mann; Dave Hadfield; Tom McGuinness

Manfred Mann's Earth Band chronology
Manfred Mann's Earth Band (1972)	Glorified Magnified (1972)	Messin' (1973)

Singles from Glorified Magnified
- 1. "Meat" Released: 10 November 1972 (UK); 2. "It's All Over Now, Baby Blue" Released: February 1973 (US)

Glorified Magnified is a rock album released in 1972 by Manfred Mann's Earth Band.

The album was produced by Manfred Mann and Dave Hadfield (except "It's All Over…" by Mann and Tom McGuinness) at Maximum Sound Studios, London, in 1972.

Professional ratings
Review scores
Source	Rating
AllMusic	4/5 stars
Christgau's Record Guide	B+
The Encyclopedia of Popular Music	3/5 stars
The Rolling Stone Album Guide	2/5 stars
Sounds	3/5 stars

== Track listing ==
Side one

1. "Meat" (Manfred Mann) – 4:03
2. "Look Around" (Chris Slade) – 5:10
3. "One Way Glass" (Mann, Peter Thomas) – 4:07
4. "I'm Gonna Have You All" (Mann) – 5:18

Side two

1. "Down Home" (Mick Rogers) – 3:17
2. "Our Friend George" (Mann) – 3:02
3. "Ashes to the Wind" (Charyl Edmonds, Jonah Thompson) – 2:14
4. "Wind" (Mann, Rogers, Pattenden, Slade) – 1:58
5. "It's All Over Now, Baby Blue" (Bob Dylan) – 4:26
6. "Glorified Magnified" (Mann) – 4:40

Bonus Tracks (1999 Reissue)

11. "Meat" (Single version) (Mann) – 3:17
12. "It's All Over Now, Baby Blue" (Single version) – 3:11

== Personnel ==
Earth Band

- Manfred Mann – organ, Minimoog synthesiser, vocals
- Mick Rogers – guitar, vocals
- Colin Pattenden – bass guitar
- Chris Slade – drums

Technical

- Dave Hadfield – producer, engineer
- Manfred Mann – producer
- Tom McGuiness – producer (track 9)
- Bloomsbury Group – design
- Re-mastered by: Robert M Corich and Mike Brown
