= Classical music in hip-hop =

- Other names: Orchestral rap; orchestral hip hop
- Stylistic origins: Hip hop; classical; classical crossover
- Derivative forms: Progressive rap

Other topics
- Jazz rap; memphis rap; progressive rap; progressive rock

Hip hop music can incorporate elements of classical music, either using live instruments or with recorded samples. Early examples of classical music instrumentation in hip hop date to the 1990s. In the 2000s, artists such as Nas, Kendrick Lamar, The Black Violin, and DJ Premier began to prominently use classical music elements.

== Style ==
Typical classical music elements in hip hop include orchestral sounds, either sample-based or recorded live. In addition, some hip hop songs may feature orchestral elements by way of sampling progressive rock tracks, such as Kanye West sampling "21st Century Schizoid Man" by King Crimson on his 2010 song "Power".

== History ==
It is believed that Afrika Bambaataa and the Soulsonic Force were the first to sample classical music into their tracks in the 1980s, in particular to the 1982 track "Planet Rock" with a sample of Stravinsky's The Firebird. Another early example of classical music in hip hop is from the 1996 The Simpsons episode "Homerpalooza". In the episode, rap group Cypress Hill steal the London Symphony Orchestra, which was intended for Peter Frampton. With the orchestra in tow, they perform their 1993 hit "Insane in the Brain" with orchestral backing. In 2023, Cypress Hill is vying to make what started out as a joke a reality by teaming up with the LSO to record an authentic orchestral version of "Insane in the Membrane". Warren G would embrace classical hip hop in a 1997 duet with Sissel on the track "Prince Igor".

Starting in the 2000s, classical music in hip hop became more prominent as Nas, Kendrick Lamar, Kanye West and Jay-Z (with Alicia Keys on "Empire State of Mind") exploring the genre. In addition to West's progressive rock sampling track "Power", he also worked with progressive rock artist Manfred Mann on his 2014 album Lone Arranger.

More recently, classical orchestras have also begun incorporating hip hop into their programs. The National Symphony Orchestra, for example, collaborated with Common and Pharrell Williams in the late 2010s, and the Nashville Symphony has experimented with hip hop as a means of attracting a younger audience.
