= Melanie Pappenheim =

British singer

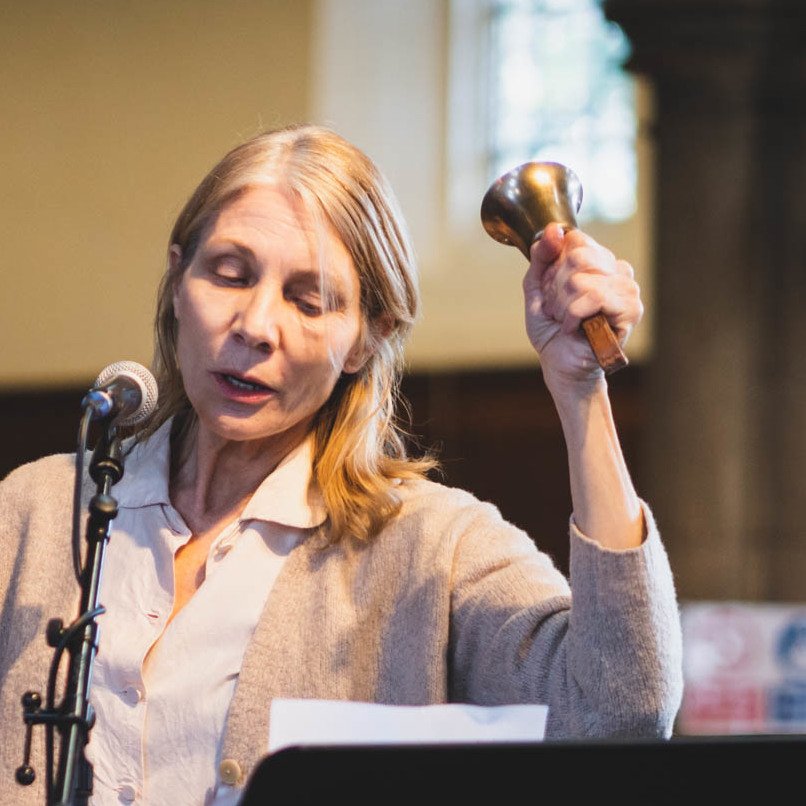
- by Paul Hudson in 2022
- Born: c.1959
- Occupations: English soprano and composer
- Known for: soundtracks including the 2005 revival of Doctor Who

Melanie Pappenheim (born 1959) is an English soprano and composer, notable for her vocal work with various British cross-disciplinary composers, with avant-garde theatre companies and on soundtracks (notably for several films and the 2005 revival of Doctor Who).

== Contemporary music ==
Pappenheim is a frequent collaborator with contemporary composer-performers Simon Fisher-Turner, Orlando Gough and Jocelyn Pook, and is also a member of their respective musical projects.

Her first recorded work was as vocalist for the avant garde jazz-pop band Shopping Trolley, which released one eponymous album on Hannibal Records in 1989 (Catalog # HNBL 1349). That album was compared to Manhattan Transfer and received positive reviews, but the band broke up shortly afterward. Since then she has been a long-term member of Pook's 10-piece ensemble, appearing on record and in concert as one of the ensemble's three vocalists. As part of the Ensemble, she has contributed to the soundtracks of Hollywood blockbuster films, Eyes Wide Shut and Gangs of New York. She also does the vocal work on the majority of Pook's music, appearing on the album Deluge (later reissued as Flood) and Untold Things.

Pappenheim's work with Simon Fisher-Turner has included contributions to the soundtracks of two Derek Jarman films. Turner has compared Pappenheim's work ethic to that of Jarman's, in that there is a great understanding between them without much communicating. (His actual quote was, "She just does what she likes...".)

Pappenheim has been a member of Gough's 16 piece choir The Shout since 1998.

In 2009, at the invitation of producer Giles Perring, Pappenheim recorded for the album 'Poets and Lighthouses' by Tuvan singer Albert Kuvezin.

She has regularly performed Paul Clark's score 'Here All Night' - a words and music collaboration with Beckett specialists Gare St Lazare - in the UK, Ireland and US.

== Doctor Who ==
Pappenheim has garnered critical and popular acclaim for her work on Doctor Who due to the ethereal vocals she provided for the Doctor's leitmotif – which the producers described semi-seriously as "President Flavia (from "The Five Doctors") singing out of the time vortex". As a result, many of the show's fans refer to her as "Flavia".

Her vocals on the track "Doomsday" (used in the dénouement of the eponymous episode) caused an influx of emails to the BBC about her contribution to the soundtrack. She subsequently appeared on Murray's second soundtrack, composed for the third series of the show and would also return to contribute her vocals to the 2007 Christmas special, Voyage of the Damned, the November 2009 Special The Waters of Mars and the 2009 Christmas Special The End of Time.

As a contributor to the show's soundtrack, Pappenheim has appeared at two special live concerts to celebrate the music by Murray Gold. The first was played at the Millennium Centre in Cardiff in 2006, and the second as part of the BBC Proms on 27 July 2008 at the Royal Albert Hall in London.

== Theatre work ==
Pappenheim's work in avant-garde theatre has included a memorable appearance as a topless female Christ figure in the 1992 DV8 Physical Theatre production Strange Fish, in which she sang while hanging from a full-size crucifix. She appeared in Clod Ensemble's An Anatomie in Four Quarters at Wales Millennium Centre (2013) and Lowry Salford (2016).

== Work as composer ==
A composer in her own right, Pappenheim frequently writes music for radio and most recently, theatre. In addition, she also teaches voice.

== Discography ==
- 2006 (2004) (with Manfred Mann's Earth Band)
- Translucence: a Song Cycle - (with Derek Jarman)
- The Garden (1999) - (with Simon Fisher-Turner)
- Edward II (2003) - (with Simon Fisher-Turner)
- Deluge (1997) - (with Jocelyn Pook)
- Flood (1999) - (with Jocelyn Pook)
- Untold Things (2001) - (with Jocelyn Pook)
- Eyes Wide Shut: Original Soundtrack (1999)
- Gangs of New York: Original Soundtrack (2003)
- Doctor Who: Original Soundtrack (2006) - (with Murray Gold)
- Doctor Who: Original Soundtrack – Series 3 (2007) - (with Murray Gold)
- Doctor Who: Original Soundtrack – Series 4 (2008) - (with Murray Gold)
- Poets and Lighthouses (2010) - (with Albert Kuvezin and Yat Kha)

=== Work on Doctor Who ===
Vocals on:

- Composed for Series 1&2 (available on Doctor Who: Original Television Soundtrack)
  - "The Doctor's Theme"
  - "Doomsday"
  - "Seeking The Doctor"
- Composed for Series 3 (available on Doctor Who: Original Television Soundtrack - Series 3)
  - "Martha's Theme"
  - "YANA (Excerpt)"
  - "The Doctor Forever"
- Composed for the "Voyage of the Damned" and Series 4. (available on Doctor Who: Original Television Soundtrack - Series 4)
  - "Astrid's Theme" *(as part of "Voyage of the Damned Suite")
  - "Turn Left"
