= Get Your Rocks Off =

Get Your Rocks Off may refer to:

- "Get Your Rocks Off", a 1967 Basement Tapes song by Bob Dylan and the Band
- Messin', titled Get Your Rocks Off in the US, a 1973 album by Manfred Mann's Earth Band
- Get Your Rocks Off, a 2002 album by Eddie and the Hot Rods
- "Get Your Rocks Off", a 2014 episode of the television series Sex Sent Me to the ER
- "Get Your Rocks Off", a task in the 2015 television series The Challenge: Battle of the Exes II
- "Getcha Rocks Off", a song by Def Leppard

== See also ==
- "Rocks" (song), a 1994 song by Primal Scream
