= Masque (Manfred Mann's Earth Band album) =

Studio album by Manfred Mann's Earth Band
- Released: 16 October 1987
- Recorded: 1987
- Studios: Workhouse Studios 1 and 2, 488–490 Old Kent Road, London
- Genres: Jazz rock; progressive rock; pop rock
- Length: 39:02
- Labels: 10/Virgin (original release); Cohesion (1999 reissue)
- Producers: Manfred Mann, Steve Forward, Mick Rogers

Manfred Mann's Earth Band chronology
Criminal Tango (1986)	Masque (1987)	Plains Music (1991)

Singles from Masque
- 1. "Geronimo's Cadillac" Released: 26 October 1987

Professional ratings
Review scores
Source	Rating
AllMusic	4.5/5 stars
The Encyclopedia of Popular Music	3/5 stars

Masque is the thirteenth studio album by Manfred Mann's Earth Band, released in 1987 on Virgin Records. Chris Thompson had left the band after their previous album Criminal Tango and the band was now at three permanent members. After this album the Earth Band name was retired until 1991.

== Background ==
The album is subtitled Songs And Planets and features some parts of Gustav Holst's Planets Suite. It represents the completion of an original project started back in 1973, which planned to use Holst's work as a basis. This was ultimately shelved because the band were unable to obtain formal permission from Holst's estate, although some of the idea of a concept album dealing with the Solar System could be seen on the band's 1973 album Solar Fire.

The opening track is a re-recording of Joybringer (from Jupiter), which had previously been a single hit in 1973, although the LP version omits the bridge (which is included on some alternative versions) and includes a different instrumental part than the 1973 recording. It also starts with a few bars of strummed guitar instead of opening cold with the vocals.

One of the Holst adaptations, Two Friends (from Mars and Saturn), was only included as a b-side on the single release of Geronimo's Cadillac and had to wait until 2021's Mannthology set for its CD debut.

Despite its title, Planets Schmanets does not have a "cosmic" background; as the Leftovers CD in the 40th Anniversary box set revealed, it is simply the instrumental coda of What You Give Is What You Get.

Another common thread of the album are jazz homages, in form of two collages that combine Billie's Bounce (featuring newly written lyrics) with Sister Sadie and Ornithology, respectively. Geronimo's Cadillac, which eventually gave way to Manfred Mann's Plains Music, also includes a jazz piano solo.

We're Going Wrong is a cover of the Cream song. Telegram to Monica was Denny Newman's third song written for the Earth Band (after Lies (Through the 80s) and Killer on the Loose) but the only one sung by him.

== Track listing ==
=== Original vinyl release ===
The track listing was changed at a late stage. The sleeves as first printed, and the record labels, indicated the following order:

==== Side one ====
1. "Sister Billie's Bounce (including "Sister Sadie" & "Billies Bounce")" (Horace Silver, Charlie Parker, Maggie Ryder, Manfred Mann)
2. "Joybringer (from 'Jupiter')" (Gustav Holst, Mann, Mick Rogers, Chris Slade)
3. "What You Give Is What You Get (Start)" (Paul Weller)
4. "Planets Schmanets" (Mann)
5. "Geronimo's Cadillac" (Michael Murphy)

==== Side two ====
1. "Billies Orno Bounce (including "Billies Bounce")" (Parker, Ryder, Mann)
2. "Telegram To Monica" (Denny Newman)
3. "The Hymn (from 'Jupiter')" (Mann, Rogers, John Lingwood)
4. "A Couple of Mates (from 'Mars' & 'Saturn')" (Mann)
5. "Hymn (Reprise)" (Mann, Rogers, Lingwood)

The actual playing order was shown on a sticker which covered the track list printed on the sleeve; there were no composer credits:

==== Side one ====
1. "Joybringer (from Jupiter)"
2. "Billies Orno Bounce (including "Billies Bounce")"
3. "What You Give Is What You Get (Start)"
4. "Rivers Run Dry"
5. "Planets Schmanets"
6. "Geronimo's Cadillac"

==== Side two ====
1. "Sister Billies Bounce (including "Sister Sadie" & "Billies Bounce")"
2. "Telegram To Monica"
3. "A Couple Of Mates (from Mars & Jupiter)"
4. "Neptune (Icebringer)"
5. "Hymn (from Jupiter)"
6. "We're Going Wrong"

This order of tracks was also used on the cassette version. The CD, instead, differs greatly from both the initial and final LP order:

=== CD release ===
1. "Joybringer (from Jupiter)" (Gustav Holst, Manfred Mann, Mick Rogers, Chris Slade) – 2:28
2. "Sister Billy's Bounce (including "Sister Sadie" & "Billy's Bounce")" (Horace Silver, Charlie Parker, Maggie Ryder, Mann) – 2:16
3. "What You Give Is What You Get (Start)" (Paul Weller) – 2:34
4. "Telegram To Monica" (Denny Newman) – 5:37
5. "Billy's Orno Bounce (including "Billy's Bounce")" (Parker, Ryder, Mann) – 3:13
6. "A Couple of Mates (from Mars & Jupiter)" (Mann) – 3:20
7. "Neptune (Icebringer)" (Mann, Rogers, John Lingwood) – 1:08
8. "Rivers Run Dry" (Rogers) – 3:04
9. "Hymn (from Jupiter)" (Mann, Rogers, Lingwood) – 3:58
10. "We're Going Wrong" (Jack Bruce, Pete Brown) – 4:00
11. "Planets Schmanets" (Mann) – 2:40
12. "Geronimo's Cadillac" (Michael Martin Murphey, Charles John Quarto) – 4:43

==== Bonus Tracks (1999 re-issue) ====
13. "Telegram To Monica" (alternate version) (Newman) – 3:12
14. "Joybringer" (extended version) (Holst, Mann, Rogers, Slade) – 3:20
15. "Geronimo's Cadillac" (7" single version) (Murphy, Quarto) – 2:58
16. "Geronimo's Cadillac" (12" single version) (Murphy, Quarto) – 5:32

The CD uses the spelling "Billy's" on tracks 2 and 5, instead of "Billies" used on the vinyl version. The original Charlie Parker composition uses "Billie's".

== Personnel ==
The Earth Band

- Manfred Mann – keyboards, trumpeton
- Maggie Ryder – vocals
- Mick Rogers – guitar, vocals
- John Lingwood – drums

Additional musicians

- Denny Newman – vocals, bass on "Telegram to Monica"
- Frank Mead – saxophones
- Anthony Moore – programming on "What You Give Is What You Get"
- Byron Bird – trumpet on "Billies Bounce"
- Guy Barker – trumpet on "Billies Bounce"
- Mark Feltham – harmonica
- Durban Betancourt – bass
- Andy Pask – bass
- Linda Taylor – vocals
- Tommy Willis – guitar
- Chris Batchelor – trumpet
- Ian Porter – emulator toggling

Technical

- Manfred Mann – producer
- Steve Forward – engineer, co-producer ("Joybringer (from Jupiter)", "Telegram to Monica", "Hymn (from Jupiter)")
- Stuart Barry, Terry Medhurst – engineers
- Neil Amor – assistant engineer
- Frances Lovell – design
- Hills Archer Studios – artwork
- Re-mastered by: Robert M Corich and Mike Brown

== Charts ==
Chart (1987)	Peak position
German Albums (Offizielle Top 100)	44
