= Lone Arranger =

Studio album by Manfred Mann
- Released: 17 October 2014
- Genres: Rock, jazz, jazz rock, electronic, hip hop, progressive rock
- Length: 46:29
- Label: Creature Music
- Producers: Manfred Mann; James Stewart

Manfred Mann chronology
2006 (2004)	Lone Arranger (2014)

Lone Arranger is the second solo album by South African keyboardist Manfred Mann. Like its predecessor, 2006, it features various guest musicians, including Kris Kristofferson, Till Brönner and Mick Rogers. It also includes three songs by other artists which sampled Manfred Mann recordings, over which Mann then added new keyboards and other contributions: "One Hand in the Air" is a shortened version of Kanye West's "So Appalled" (which sampled "You Are, I Am"), with an added chorus by Caitlyn Scarlett. "I Came for You" is the Disco Boys remix, slightly shortened and with new synth solos added. Likewise, "One Way Stand-Up" is the Prodigy's "Stand Up", which was based on Manfred Mann Chapter Three's "One Way Glass", with added keyboards.

The album was released in Europe on 17 October 2014 and in the UK on 20 October on CD and double vinyl; a deluxe version with a bonus disc of out-takes and extras was also released.

One of the bonus tracks called "Boots" includes elements of an earlier song that was released by Manfred Mann as an mp3 download but was then withdrawn due to the song's original writers withdrawing their consent (the song had used the structure and chorus of the Eels song "To Lick Your Boots"). At the time Mann's "(Lick Your) Boots" was released, the upcoming album was still announced as Rational Anthems before the title was changed to Lone Arranger.

== Track listing ==
1. "One Hand in the Air" (Mann, Kanye West) - 2:54
2. "All Right Now" (Andy Fraser, Paul Rodgers) - 3:57
3. "Rock You" (Brian May) - 2:56
4. "Footprints (En Aranjuez con tu amor)" (based on the second movement of Joaquín Rodrigo's Concierto de Aranjuez) - 3:53
5. "I Came for You" (Bruce Springsteen) - 3:14
6. "Light My Fire" (Jim Morrison, John Densmore, Ray Manzarek, Robby Krieger) - 4:43
7. "I Heard It Through the Grapevine" (Barrett Strong, Norman Whitfield) - 3:48
8. "Nothing Compares to You" (Prince) - 4:25
9. "Insects" (Mann, Felix Tani, lyrics by Hakan Nesser) - 2:09
10. "UKOR" (Mann) - 1:45
11. "Aranjuez First Movement (En Aranjuez con tu amor)" (based on the first movement of Concierto de Aranjuez) - 3:41
12. "Bang a Gong" (Marc Bolan) - 3:34
13. "The Crystal Ship" (Morrison, Densmore, Manzarek, Krieger) - 2:00
14. "One Way Stand-Up" (Liam Howlett, Mann, Peter Thomas) - 3:37

Deluxe Edition Bonus Disc

1. "Footprints (En Aranjuez Con Tu Amor)" (Rodrigo) - 3:50
2. "Rock You" (May) - 3:18
3. "God Save the Queen" (traditional) - 3:39
4. "Slogo" - 4:02
5. "Nothing Compares to You" (Prince) - 4:48
6. "God Save" - 1:48
7. "Boots" - 2:14
8. "Boots" (video) - 2:13

== Personnel ==
- Manfred Mann - keyboards, bass, drum program, production, liner Notes
- Jay-Z, Swizz Beatz, Pusha T, Caitlyn Scarlett, Carleen Anderson, Kjell Torgerson, Molly B, Nubya, Aina, Phoebe Edwards, Viktoria Tolstoy, Chris Thompson, Robert Hart, Ruby Turner, Jessica Darling, Hakan Nesser, Noel McCalla, Uli & Elliot Barry - vocals
- Kris Kristofferson, Lara Norris - spoken vocals
- James Stewart - vocals, bass, additional production, arrangements, engineering, mixing
- Till Brönner - trumpet
- Billy Thompson - violin
- Mick Rogers, Pete Rinaldi - guitars
- Eric Coenen, Phil Mulford, Mark King, Billy Sherwood - bass
- Jimmy Copley, Louisian Boltner, Pelle Hanspers, John Tonks, Scott Connor - drums/drum program
- Felix Tani - piano

Technical

- Ian Caple, Ian Tompson, (Maurizio) Mo Panella - additional engineering/mixing
- Fredrik Lidin - mastering
- Luke Weall - design, art direction
- Claude Piscitelli - cover photo
- Keir Fernie - additional photography
