= 2006 (album) =

2004 studio album by Manfred Mann

Studio album by Manfred Mann '06 with Manfred Mann's Earth Band
- Released: 25 October 2004
- Recorded: 2004
- Genres: Hard rock; progressive rock; jazz rock
- Length: 48:17
- Label: Cohesion
- Producers: Manfred Mann; Dean Hart

Manfred Mann '06 with Manfred Mann's Earth Band chronology
| The Best Of Manfred Mann's Earth Band Re-Mastered Volume II (2001) | 2006 (2004) | Odds & Sods - Mis-takes & Out-takes (2005) |

Manfred Mann chronology
| Plains Music (1991) | 2006 (2004) | Lone Arranger (2014) |

Professional ratings
Review scores
| Source | Rating |
|---|---|
| Allmusic | 4.5/5 stars |

2006 is an album released in 2004 by Manfred Mann with Manfred Mann's Earth Band. Manfred Mann preferred to point out that this is rather his solo album. His explanation for this is given in the sleeve notes, where he says that some of the tracks ('Mars', 'Two Friends', 'Two Brides', ' Slave', 'Frog' and 'Get Me Out of This') were recorded in a more unrehearsed and experimental way than the others. Because of this, Mann preferred to present this outside the normal Earth Band context, as representative only of his personal tastes and not those of his Earth Band colleagues. He also remarks that the album title is not consistent with its release year (2004, or in some places 2005) because the resulting anachronism seems to him artistically interesting.

== Track listing ==
| No. | Title | Writer(s) | Length |
|---|---|---|---|
| 1. | "Demons and Dragons" (With Thomas D) | Mann, McAloon, Super Furry Animals | 3:29 |
| 2. | "Two Brides" (Interlude) | Mann, Guy | 1:22 |
| 3. | "Down in Mexico" | Leiber, Stoller | 3:31 |
| 4. | "Happenstance" (Instrumental) | Mann | 3:02 |
| 5. | "The History of Sexual Jealousy Parts 17 to 24" | Nick Currie | 4:46 |
| 6. | "Black Eyes" | Mann, Pook | 2:10 |
| 7. | "Mars" | Mann, Guy, Holst | 3:56 |
| 8. | "Get Me Out of This" | Mann, Guy, Massenet | 5:35 |
| 9. | "Frog" | Mann | 4:29 |
| 10. | "Two Friends" | Mann, Guy | 5:24 |
| 11. | "Monkmann" | Traditional; arranged by Hart and Mann | 3:10 |
| 12. | "Marche Slave" (Instrumental Interlude) | Mann, Tchaikovsky | 1:42 |
| 13. | "Independent Woman" (With Thomas D) | Tchaikovsky, Hart, Shante, Guy, Mann, Thomas D, Clear, Williams | 3:30 |
| 14. | "Dragons" (reprise) | Mann, McAloon, Super Furry Animals | 2:01 |

== Personnel ==
- Manfred Mann – keyboards, vocals
- Mick Rogers – guitars
- Geoff Dunn – drums
- Steve Kinch – bass
- Noel McCalla – vocals

with

- Chris Thompson – vocals
- Thomas D – vocals
- Matt Loffstadt – guitars
- Don Freeman – poem and talking
- Barbara Thompson – saxophone
- Dean Hart – bass, guitars, vocals
- Hazel Hernandez – vocals
- Melanie Pappenheim – vocals
- Arte Chorale – vocals
- Henry's Eight – vocals
