= Budapest Live =

Live album by Manfred Mann's Earth Band
- Released: 17 February 1984
- Recorded: 6–7 April 1983
- Venue: Budapest Sporthalle, Budapest, Hungary
- Genre: Rock; hard rock; progressive rock
- Length: 40:51
- Label: Bronze (UK original release); Cohesion (UK 1999 reissue)
- Producer: Chris Thompson; John Lingwood

Manfred Mann's Earth Band chronology
Somewhere in Afrika (1982)	Budapest Live (1984)	Criminal Tango (1986)

Singles from Budapest Live
- 1. "Davy's on the Road Again" Released: February 1984

Professional ratings
Review scores
Source	Rating
AllMusic	3.5/5 stars
Encyclopedia of Popular Music	3/5 stars
Only Solitaire	3.5/5 stars

Budapest Live is an album released in 1984 by Manfred Mann's Earth Band. The album was recorded on the "Somewhere in Europe" tour in 1983 in support of the "Somewhere in Afrika" album, and despite its title, also featured recordings from the Dominion Theatre in London. It was the final Earth Band album to appear on the Bronze label and also the last album recorded with Steve Waller and Matt Irving.

The album has long since been criticized by fans for being radically edited down from the actual gig length, thereby losing a lot of live staples ("Martha's Madman", "You Angel You") and many songs now having instrumental passages shortened or completely removed ("Davy's on the Road Again", "Mighty Quinn" and "Demolition Man", the latter being around ten minutes in concert). The cassette release added two more recordings from the concert - parts 1 and 2 of the "Africa Suite" and "Don't Kill It Carol".

The album was not released in the United States, but broadcast on the King Biscuit Flower Hour program. Since the band had changed line-ups in the meantime and scored a hit with the single "Runner", a "live" version (recorded in the studio, with fake crowd noise) was added to this version of the concert. The b-side of the "Runner" single had contained the track "No Transkei", which was yet another re-titled version of "To Bantustan?" (the second part of the "Africa Suite", called "Where Do They Send Them" on the Budapest Live cassette), again taken from the Budapest concerts.

These three tracks were all included on the 1999 CD release as bonus tracks. The 1999 CD also altered the running order, making "Lies" (introduced by Chris Thompson saying "Hello Budapest!") the opener (although this is not reflected on the packaging) and crossfading most of the audience noise. The remaster from the 40th Anniversary Box Set reverted to the original LP order and omitted the bonus tracks.

In 2007, a DVD was released of the TV broadcast, which includes all originally played tracks in original length except "Eyes of Nostradamus" and "Davy's on the Road Again".

== Track listing (original LP) ==
=== Side one ===
1. "Spirits in the Night" (Bruce Springsteen) – 5:54
2. "Demolition Man" (Gordon Sumner) – 4:14
3. "For You" (Springsteen) – 6:36
4. "Davy's on the Road Again" (John Simon, Robbie Robertson) – 4:37

=== Side two ===
5. "Lies (Through The 80's)" (Denny Newman) – 4:30
6. "Blinded by the Light" (Springsteen) – 7:38
7. "Redemption Song (No Kwazulu)" (Bob Marley) – 3:22
8. "Mighty Quinn" (Bob Dylan) – 4:00

=== Cassette bonus tracks ===
9. "Brothers and Sisters of Africa/Where Do They Send Them" (Manfred Mann) – 5:24
10. "Don't Kill It Carol" (Mike Heron) – 4:55

== Track listing (1999 CD re-issue) ==
1. "Lies (Through The 80's)" (Denny Newman) – 4:30
2. "Spirits in the Night" (Bruce Springsteen) – 5:54
3. "Demolition Man" (Gordon Sumner) – 4:14
4. "For You" (Springsteen) – 6:36
5. "Davy's on the Road Again" (John Simon, Robbie Robertson) – 4:37
6. "Blinded by the Light" (Springsteen) – 7:38
7. "Redemption Song (No Kwazulu)" (Bob Marley) – 3:22
8. "Mighty Quinn" (Bob Dylan) – 4:00

=== Bonus tracks ===
9. "Runner" (Ian Thomas) – 5:02
10. "No Transkei" (Manfred Mann) – 5:11 [the title for part 2 from the "Runner" single now used for both parts 1 and 2]
11. "Don't Kill It Carol" (Mike Heron) – 5:21

== Track listing (2007 DVD) ==
1. "Angels at My Gate" (Mann, Jimme O'Neill, Hirth Martinez)
2. "Lies (Through The 80's)" (Denny Newman)
3. "Africa Suite" (Mann)
4. "Tribal Statistics" (Andy Qunta)
5. "Martha's Madman" (Lane Tietgen)
6. "You Angel You" (Dylan)
7. "For You" (Springsteen)
8. "Demolition Man" (Gordon Sumner)
9. "Mighty Quinn" (Bob Dylan)
10. "Don't Kill It Carol" (Mike Heron)
11. "Blinded by the Light" (Springsteen)
12. "Redemption Song (No Kwazulu)" (Bob Marley)

== Personnel ==
=== The Earth Band ===
- Manfred Mann – keyboards, synthesisers, vocals
- John Lingwood – drums
- Steve Waller – guitar, vocals (except "Runner")
- Chris Thompson – vocals, guitar
- Matt Irving – bass, vocals
- Mick Rogers − guitar, vocals on "Runner"

=== Technical ===
- John Lingwood, Chris Thompson – producers
- Pete 'Manuel' Carlson – engineer
- Alan Bradshaw – engineer
- Terry "Luigi" Medhurst – mixing engineer
- Simon Porter – photography
- Re-mastered by: Robert M Corich and Mike Brown

== Charts ==
Chart (1984)	Peak position
Australian Albums (Kent Music Report)	70
German Albums (Offizielle Top 100)	34
Swedish Albums (Sverigetopplistan)	25
Swiss Albums (Schweizer Hitparade)	23
