= Chance (Manfred Mann's Earth Band album) =

Studio album by Manfred Mann's Earth Band
- Released: 10 October 1980
- Recorded: 1979–1980
- Studios: Workhouse, London; Casa das Flores, Albufeira, Portugal
- Genres: Rock; hard rock; progressive rock
- Length: 39:39
- Labels: Bronze (UK original release); Cohesion (UK 1999 reissue); Warner Bros. (U.S.)
- Producers: Manfred Mann, Trevor Rabin

Manfred Mann's Earth Band chronology
Angel Station (1979)	Chance (1980)	Somewhere in Afrika (1982)

Singles from Chance
- 1. "Lies (Through the 80s)" Released: 29 August 1980; 2. "For You" Released: 9 January 1981

Professional ratings
Review scores
Source	Rating
AllMusic	3.5/5 stars
The Encyclopedia of Popular Music	3/5 stars
Melody Maker	mixed
Musikexpress	4/5 stars
Record Mirror	3.5/5 stars
The Rolling Stone Album Guide	2/5 stars
Sounds	favourable

Chance is Manfred Mann's Earth Band's tenth album, released in 1980. The album cover art was an adaptation of Danish artist Ole Kortzau's poster "Strandstole" (deck chairs). The album marked the temporary return of guitarist and founding member Mick Rogers to the band. John Lingwood replaced drummer Geoff Britton, who left due to illness. It is also the last album that bassist Pat King appeared on. Although Chris Thompson only appeared as a guest vocalist (having officially left the band after Angel Station), he was onboard again for the accompanying tour.

== Track listing ==
Side one

1. "Lies (Through the 80s)" (Denny Newman) – 4:37
2. "On the Run" (Manfred Mann, Tony Ashton, Florrie Palmer) – 3:53
3. "For You" (Bruce Springsteen) – 5:41
4. "Adolescent Dream" (Mann) – 2:42
5. "Fritz the Blank" (Mann) – 2:52

Side two

1. "Stranded" (Mike Heron, Mann) – 5:49
2. "Hello, I Am Your Heart" (Dennis Linde) – 5:19
3. "No Guarantee" (Mann) – 3:50
4. "Heart on the Street" (Tom Gray) – 4:56

Bonus tracks (1999 CD re-issue)

10. "A Fool I Am" (single B side) (Mann, Pat King, John Lingwood, Steve Waller) – 4:16
11. "Adolescent Dream" (single version) (Mann) – 2:24
12. "Lies (Through the 80s)" (single version) (Newman) – 4:15
13. "For You" (single version) (Springsteen) – 3:53

== Personnel ==
The Earth Band

- Manfred Mann – keyboards, vocals ("Adolescent Dream")
- John Lingwood – drums
- Pat King – bass, bass pedals, backing vocals
- Mick Rogers – guitars, backing vocals
- Steve Waller – guitars, vocals ("Hello, I Am Your Heart")
- Chris Thompson – vocals ("Lies Through the 80s", "On the Run", "For You"; co-lead vocals on "Stranded")

Additional musicians

- Trevor Rabin – guitars, backing vocals
- Robbie McIntosh – guitars, backing vocals
- Geoff Whitehorn – guitars, backing vocals
- Barbara Thompson – saxophone ("On the Run")
- Dyan Birch – vocals ("No Guarantee" and others)
- Willy Finlayson – vocals ("Heart on the Street")
- Peter Marsh – vocals ("Stranded")
- Carol Stocker – backing vocals

Technical

- Manfred Mann – producer
- Trevor Rabin – producer
- Bernie Clarke – co-producer (Portugal)
- Rik Walton – engineer
- David Barratt, Edwin Cross, Laurie Latham, Robert Stewart – assistant engineers
- Peter Schwier, Tim Summerhayes – assistant engineers (Portugal)
- Martin Poole – design
- Ole Kortzau – cover art
- Remaster by: Robert M Corich and Mike Brown

== Charts ==
=== Weekly charts ===
Chart (1980–1981)	Peak position
Australian Albums (Kent Music Report)	42
Austrian Albums (Ö3 Austria)	12
German Albums (Offizielle Top 100)	11
Norwegian Albums (VG-lista)	16
Swedish Albums (Sverigetopplistan)	13
US Billboard 200	87

=== Year-end charts ===
Chart (1981)	Position
German Albums (Offizielle Top 100)	48
