= Manfred Mann's Earth Band (album) =

Studio album by Manfred Mann's Earth Band
- Released: 24 January 1972
- Recorded: 1971
- Studio: Maximum Sound and IBC, London
- Genre: Rock
- Length: 41:35
- Label: Polydor
- Producer: Manfred Mann, Dave Hadfield, David MacKay

Manfred Mann chronology
Manfred Mann Chapter Three Volume Two (1970)	Manfred Mann's Earth Band (1972)	Glorified Magnified (1972)

Singles from Manfred Mann's Earth Band
- 1. "Living Without You" Released: 25 June 1971; 2. "Please Mrs Henry" Released: 10 September 1971; 3. "I'm Up and I'm Leaving" Released: March 1972 (US)

Manfred Mann's Earth Band is the debut studio album by English rock band Manfred Mann's Earth Band, released on 24 January 1972 by Polydor Records.

== Marketing and sales ==
Manfred Mann's Earth Band was first released in January 1972 by Polydor Records in the United States, where it sold modestly and charted for six weeks on the Billboard 200, peaking at number 138 on 18 March. The single "Living Without You" spent seven weeks on the Billboard Hot 100, reaching number 69 on 8 April. In the United Kingdom, the album was released on 18 February by Philips Records to lesser sales.

== Critical reception ==
Professional ratings
Review scores
Source	Rating
AllMusic	4.5/5 stars
Christgau's Record Guide	A+
Creem	favourable
Disc	3/4 stars
The Encyclopedia of Popular Music	2/5 stars
Rolling Stone	unfavourable
The Rolling Stone Album Guide	4/5 stars
Sounds	2/5 stars

The album was met with positive reviews from American critics. Henry Edwards of High Fidelity said the Earth Band had proved themselves greatly superior to other acts in the "British Blues Invasion of the Seventies" by displaying a dedication to the music rather than flaunting their individual abilities. He also applauded bandleader Manfred Mann's performances of "Part Time Man" and "I'm Up and I'm Leaving", writing that they possessed "that haunting, urgent quality that has always marked Mann not only as a quality rocker but also as a musician with serious intentions and the ability to realize them". Ramparts called the album a respite from the "excessively abstracted psychedelic/hard rock" of the time, as well as an exceptional-sounding record that would prove to be "a landmark in the assimilation of new technology into rock without yielding to any impulse to make it a gimmick". At the end of 1972, Manfred Mann's Earth Band was named the third best album of the year in Robert Christgau's column for Newsday. The music critic applauded Mann's innovative synthesizer parts and both the "original and borrowed" lyrics, while calling the album "one of those future-rock records that will probably spawn no heirs, even by the group that made it". Reviewers in the UK were less receptive to the album, according to Robert Corich in his notes for its reissue.

Christgau later ranked the album number 17 on a decade-end list for The Village Voice, and described it as "an extraordinary cult record" that achieved rock's dichotomous "art-commerce" synthesis, something he said Mann had espoused since the early years of his music career. AllMusic critic J.P. Ollio called it "a completely satisfying album and one of the most underrated of the '70s", in which the Earth Band explored "arty and progressive directions" without succumbing to the weight of their own pretensions. Ollio highlighted the record's "hypnotic instrumentals", Mann's "exhilarating original songs", and the "three definitive covers" of Randy Newman's "Living Without You", Dr. John's "Jump Sturdy", and Bob Dylan's "Please, Mrs. Henry".

== Track listing ==
Side one

1. "California Coastline" (Walt Meskell, Tim Martin) – 2:48
2. "Captain Bobby Stout" (Lane Tietgen) – 6:54
3. "Sloth" (Manfred Mann, Mick Rogers) – 1:27
4. "Living Without You" (Randy Newman) – 3:36
5. "Tribute" (Mann) – 5:32

Side two

1. "Please Mrs Henry" (Bob Dylan) – 4:32
2. "Jump Sturdy" (Dr. John Creaux) – 4:49
3. "Prayer" (Mann) – 5:41
4. "Part Time Man" (David Sadler, Mann) – 3:05
5. "I'm Up and I'm Leaving" (Mann, Sadler) – 3:11
- Sides one and two were combined as tracks 1–10 on CD reissues.

1999 CD bonus tracks

11. "Living Without You" (Single version mono) (Newman) – 3:36
12. "California Coastline" (Single version mono) (Meskell, Martin) – 2:47
13. "Mrs Henry" (Single version mono) (Dylan) – 2:39

== Personnel ==
Credits are adapted from the album's 1999 reissue booklet.

Manfred Mann's Earth Band

- Manfred Mann – Hammond organ, Minimoog synthesizer, backing vocals, lead vocals on “Part Time Man” and “I’m Up and Leaving”, production
- Mick Rogers – electric guitar, lead vocals
- Colin Pattenden – bass guitar
- Chris Slade – drums

Additional personnel

- Liza Strike, Judith Powell, Linda Lewis, Terry Britten, Trevor Spencer, Barry Guard and Kevin Peake - backing vocals
- David Mackay – producer
- Dave Hadfield – engineer, producer
- John Pantry – engineer
- Bloomsbury Group – design
- Bob Foster – photography
- Re-mastered by: Robert M. Corich and Mike Brown

== Charts ==
Chart (1972)	Peak position
US Billboard 200	138

== Certifications ==
Region	Certification	Certified units/sales
Norway (IFPI Norway)	Platinum	50,000^{*}
^{*} Sales figures based on certification alone.
