= Angel Station =

Studio album by Manfred Mann's Earth Band
- Released: 9 March 1979
- Recorded: August 1978 – January 1979
- Studios: Workhouse, Old Kent Road, London; Noel Redding's House, Clonakilty, County Cork
- Genres: Progressive rock; art rock
- Length: 38:47
- Labels: Bronze (UK); Warner Bros. (US)
- Producers: Anthony Moore; Manfred Mann

Manfred Mann's Earth Band chronology
Watch (1978)	Angel Station (1979)	Chance (1980)

Singles from Angel Station
- 1. "You Angel You" Released: 2 February 1979; 2. "Don't Kill It Carol" Released: 8 June 1979

Angel Station is the ninth album released by Manfred Mann's Earth Band, released in 1979. Several line-up changes were made for this album. Ex-Wings drummer Geoff Britton replaced founding drummer Chris Slade and Steve Waller replaced guitarist Dave Flett. Britton left the band soon after due to illness, and was replaced by John Lingwood. Also in the line-up were Pat King on bass guitar from the then current line-up and Chris Thompson.

== Background ==
Angel Station features a six-note descending theme in most of the songs on the album, woven into the context of each song in a different way, an idea hatched by Pat King after having watched Close Encounters of the Third Kind. "Hollywood Town" and "You Are, I Am" share a common chord progression and basic arrangement. They occupied almost identical positions on either side of the LP.

Of interest is the involvement of Fingerprintz's Jimme O'Neill whose influence can be heard in the edgy, angular instrumental "Platform End" (a song whose title was probably influenced by the fact that it originally closed the 1979 vinyl's A side, while it was also a play on the back cover of the previous album Watch), and ex-Slapp Happy/Henry Cow member Anthony Moore who produced the album and influenced its modern, sparse sound.

This is Chris Thompson's last album with the Earth Band as he is forming his own band in the near future. I wish to thank him for a valuable creative and personal relationship, and wish him every success in the future. – Manfred Mann, 1979

In spite of this announcement, Thompson's own outfit Night turned out as unsuccessful, releasing two mostly overlooked albums in 1979 and 1980 respectively, so the singer stayed with the Earth Band instead, returning on the group's next album Chance (1980) already.

The album was on the US Billboard 200 charts for thirteen weeks, peaking at No. 144 on 9 June 1979. The single "You Angel You" spent seven weeks on the US Billboard Hot 100 chart peaking at No. 58 on 14 July 1979. The album spent eight weeks and reached No. 4 on the German Media Control Albums Chart.

Kanye West sampled the bridge from "You Are, I Am" for the track "So Appalled" from West's 2010 album, My Beautiful Dark Twisted Fantasy. Manfred Mann adapted this recording into his own track "One Hand in the Air" on his 2014 album Lone Arranger.

Platform End also became the title of the official MMEB fanclub's magazine, nowadays it is the fanclub website's name.

== Critical reception ==
Professional ratings
Review scores
Source	Rating
AllMusic	3/5 stars
The Encyclopedia of Popular Music	3/5 stars
Melody Maker	favourable
Music Week	4/4 stars
Musikexpress	5/5 stars
NME	favourable
The Rolling Stone Album Guide	3/5 stars

The Globe and Mail noted that "there are no songs with the hit potential of 'Blinded By the Light', only a safe copy called 'Don't Kill It Carol', by former Incredible String Bander Mike Heron."

== Track listing ==
Side one

1. "Don't Kill It Carol" (Mike Heron) – 6:18
2. "You Angel You" (Bob Dylan) – 4:02
3. "Hollywood Town" (Harriet Schock) – 5:09
4. "'Belle' of the Earth" (Manfred Mann) – 2:46
5. "Platform End" (Mann, Geoff Britton, Pat King, Steve Waller, Chris Thompson, Jimme O'Neill) – 1:32

Side two

1. "Angels at My Gate" (Mann, Hirth Martinez, O'Neill) – 4:50
2. "You Are – I Am" (Mann) – 5:11
3. "Waiting for the Rain" (Billy Falcon) – 6:17
4. "Resurrection" (Mann) – 2:42

1999 CD re-issue bonus tracks

10. "Don't Kill It Carol" (single version) (Heron) – 3:58
11. "You Angel You" (single version) (Dylan) – 3:46

== Personnel ==
The Earth Band

- Chris Thompson – vocals (chorus of "Don't Kill It Carol", "You Angel You", "Hollywood Town", ""Belle" of the Earth", "You Are - I Am", "Waiting for the Rain")
- Steve Waller – guitar, vocals (verse of "Don't Kill it Carol", "You Angel You", ""Belle" of the Earth", "Angels at My Gate", "You Are - I Am")
- Manfred Mann – keyboards, vocals ("Resurrection", bridge of "Don't Kill It Carol")
- Pat King – bass guitar, vocals (Co-lead vocals and backing vocals on verse of "Don't kill it Carol" and "Angel's at my gate")
- Geoff Britton – drums, alto saxophone

Additional musicians

- Anthony Moore – guitar, sequencer, synthesizer
- Jimme O'Neill – rhythm guitar, arrangements
- Graham Preskett – violin ("Waiting for the Rain")
- Dyan Birch – backing vocals

Technical

- Anthony Moore – producer
- Rik Walton – engineer
- Davie Phee, Edwin Cross – assistant engineers
- Martin Poole – art direction
- John Shaw – photography (front cover)
- Pat King – photography (back cover)
- Re-mastered by: Robert M Corich and Mike Brown

== Charts ==
=== Weekly charts ===
Chart (1979)	Peak position
Australian Albums (Kent Music Report)	22
Austrian Albums (Ö3 Austria)	6
Dutch Albums (Album Top 100)	19
Finnish Albums (The Official Finnish Charts)	10
German Albums (Offizielle Top 100)	4
Norwegian Albums (VG-lista)	3
Swedish Albums (Sverigetopplistan)	6
UK Albums (Official Charts)	30
US Billboard 200	144

=== Year-end charts ===
Chart (1979)	Position
German Albums (Offizielle Top 100)	8

== Certifications ==
Region	Certification	Certified units/sales
Australia (ARIA)	Gold	20,000^{^}
Germany (BVMI)	Gold	250,000^{^}
^{^} Shipments figures based on certification alone.
