= Mann Alive =

Live album by Manfred Mann's Earth Band
- Released: May 1998
- Recorded: Soft Vengeance European Tour 1996–1997
- Genres: Rock; Hard rock Progressive rock
- Length: 106:33
- Label: Cohesion
- Producer: Manfred Mann

Manfred Mann's Earth Band chronology
Soft Vengeance (1996)	Mann Alive (1998)	The Best Of Manfred Mann's Earth Band Re-Mastered (1999)

Professional ratings
Review scores
Source	Rating
Allmusic	(not rated)

Mann Alive is a live double album released in 1998 by Manfred Mann's Earth Band.

== Track listing ==
CD1 The Gig

1. "Martha's Madman" (Lane Tietgen) – 10:07
2. "The Times They Are a-Changin' " (Bob Dylan) – 6:35
3. "You Angel You" (Dylan) – 4:11
4. "Father of Day, Father of Night" (Dylan) – 10:25
5. "For You" (Bruce Springsteen) – 3:44
6. "It's A Fine Line" (Manfred Mann, Steve Kinch, John Trotter, Mick Rogers) – 1:32
7. "Demolition Man" (Gordon Sumner) – 7:17
8. "Nothing Ever Happens" (Justin Currie) – 4:45
9. "She Was" (Mann, Kinch, Trotter, Rogers) – 3:40
10. "Blinded by the Light" (Springsteen) – 9:00
11. "Davy's On The Road Again" (John Simon, Robbie Robertson) – 6:24

CD2 Encore & More

1. "I'll Give You" (Mann, Kinch, Trotter, Rogers) – 2:15
2. "Shelter from the Storm" (Dylan) – 6:26
3. "Redemption Song" (Bob Marley) – 3:36
4. "The Mighty Quinn" (Dylan) – 6:59
5. "Demolition Man" (Short version) (Sumner) – 3:02
6. "Blinded by the Light" (Short version) (Springsteen) – 4:55
7. "Redemption Song (Alternate Version)" (Marley) – 3:52
8. "Instrumedicine Song" (Mann, Mike Heron) – 4:06
9. "Sikelele I" (Traditional; arranged by Mann) – 3:40

Last two tracks taken from the album Plains Music

== Personnel ==
- Manfred Mann - keyboards, vocals
- Mick Rogers - guitars, vocals
- John Trotter - drums
- Steve Kinch - bass, backing vocals
- Noel McCalla - vocals
- Chris Thompson - guitar, vocals
- Mastered by: Robert M Corich and Mike Brown
