= Messin' =

Studio album by Manfred Mann's Earth Band
- Released: 15 June 1973
- Recorded: 1973
- Studio: Maximum Sound Studios, London
- Genre: Hard rock; progressive rock; jazz rock
- Length: 41:16
- Label: Vertigo (UK original release); Bronze (UK 1977 reissue); Polydor (U.S.)
- Producer: Manfred Mann

Manfred Mann's Earth Band chronology
Glorified Magnified (1972)	Messin' (1973)	Solar Fire (1973)

Singles from Messin
- 1. "Get Your Rocks Off" Released: 20 April 1973 (UK); 2. "Mardi Gras Day" Released: June 1973 (US)

Professional ratings
Review scores
Source	Rating
AllMusic	4/5 stars
Christgau's Record Guide	A−
Creem	unrated
The Encyclopedia of Popular Music	4/5 stars
Melody Maker	favourable
Rolling Stone	favourable
The Rolling Stone Album Guide	3/5 stars
Sounds	3/5 stars

Messin' is a rock album released in 1973 by Manfred Mann's Earth Band.

"Buddah" also appeared on the Vertigo budget sampler double album Suck It and See, along with tracks by then-labelmates Kraftwerk, Jade Warrior and the Sensational Alex Harvey Band, amongst others.

The album was produced by Manfred Mann and engineered by John Edwards at Maximum Sound Studios, London in 1973.

For the United States release, the album was re-titled Get Your Rocks Off and the track "Pretty Good" was included in place of "Black and Blue", seemingly because the latter was about slavery and deemed unsuitable for the US market. Both tracks were included on the 1998 re-mastered re-issue. Under this title, the album just barely made the US Billboard 200, spending only two weeks on the charts and peaking at number 196 on June 30, 1973.

== UK track listing ==
=== Messin' ===
Side one

1. "Messin'" (Mike Hugg) – 9:54
2. "Buddah" (Manfred Mann, Mick Rogers) – 7:01
3. "Cloudy Eyes" (Mann) – 5:32

Side two

4. "Get Your Rocks Off" (Bob Dylan) – 2:51
5. "Sadjoy" (Mann) – 5:20
6. "Black and Blue" (Chain: Barry Sullivan, Matt Taylor, Phil Manning, Barry Harvey) – 7:21 (6:44 on the 1998 re-issue)
7. "Mardi Gras Day" (Dr John Creaux) – 3:02

Bonus Tracks (1998 re-issue)

8. "Pretty Good" (John Prine) – 4:11
9. "Cloudy Eyes" (single edit) (Mann) – 3:31

== US track listing ==
=== Get Your Rocks Off ===
Side one

1. "Messin'" (Mike Hugg) – 10:00
2. "Pretty Good" (John Prine) – 4:00
3. "Sadjoy" (Manfred Mann) – 4:30

Side two

4. "Get Your Rocks Off" (Bob Dylan) – 3:00
5. "Buddah" (Mann, Mick Rogers) – 7:00
6. "Cloudy Eyes" (Mann) – 5:30
7. "Mardi Gras Day" (Dr John Creaux) – 3:00

== Personnel ==
The Earth Band

- Manfred Mann – organ, Minimoog synthesiser
- Mick Rogers – electric guitar, lead vocals
- Colin Pattenden – bass guitar
- Chris Slade – drums

Additional musicians

- Laurie Baker – Machines and Zoo on "Messin' "
- Liza Strike – backing vocals
- Vicki Brown – backing vocals
- Judith Powell – backing vocals
- Ruby James – backing vocals

Technical

- Manfred Mann – producer
- John Edwards – engineer
- Laurence Latham – engineer ("Sadjoy")
- Peter Hignett – sleeve concept
- Peter Goodfellow – illustration
- Re-mastered by: Robert M Corich and Mike Brown

== Charts ==
Chart (1973)	Peak position
US Billboard 200	196
