= Noel McCalla =

British singer (born 1956)

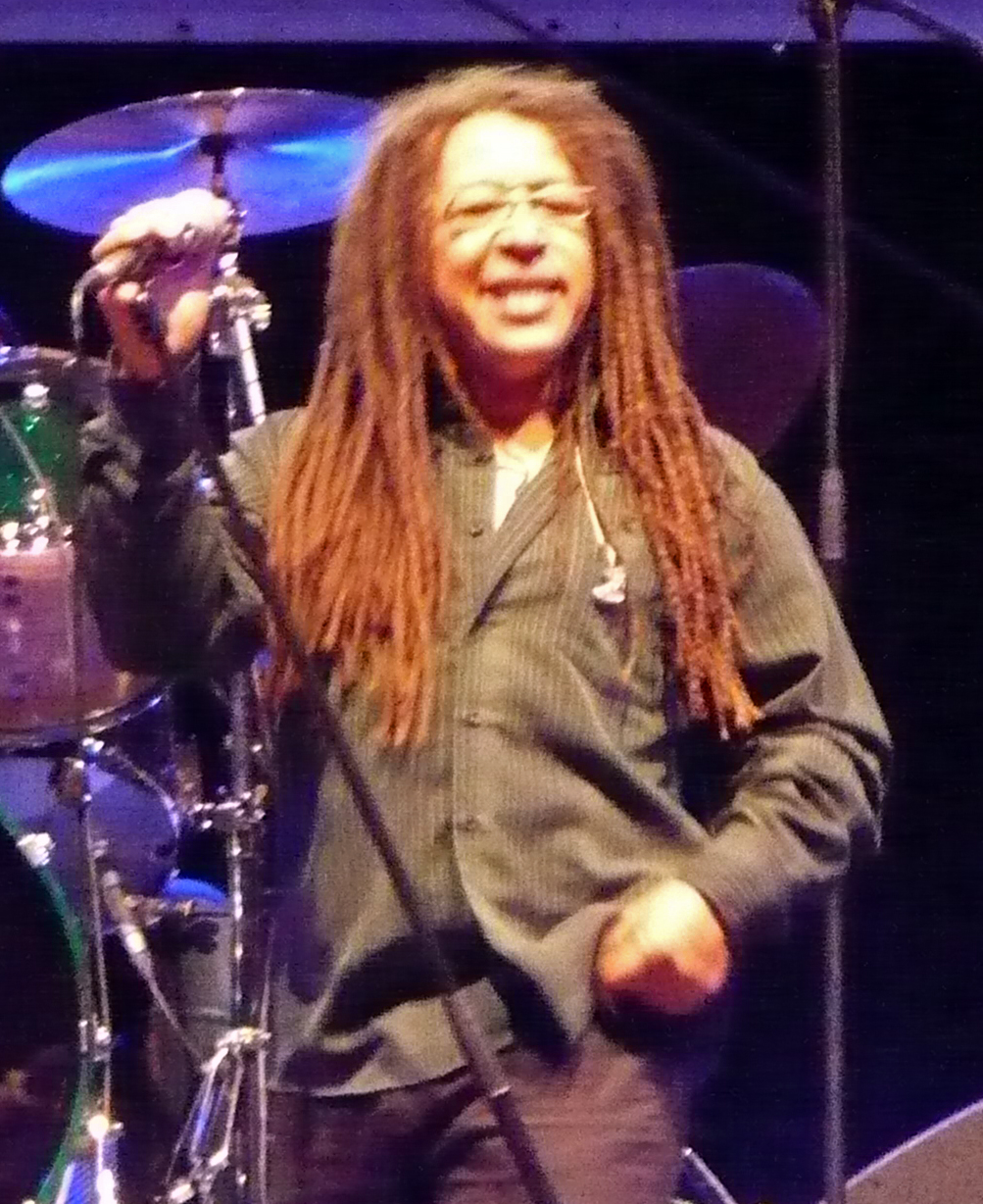
- Noel McCalla in concert with Manfred Mann's Earth Band at the Ermstal Open Air Festival in Bad Urach, Germany on May 30, 2009

Background information
- Born: Noel McCalla; 5 November 1956 (age 69); London, England
- Genres: Progressive rock; hard rock; jazz rock; blues; gospel music
- Occupation: Singer
- Years active: 1972–present

Noel McCalla (born 5 November 1956, in London, England) is a British rock singer. He was the lead vocalist for the rock group Manfred Mann's Earth Band from 1991 until 2009.

== Early life ==
McCalla was born to Hubert Sylvester McCalla, a minister in a gospel church, and Elizabeth Victoria McCalla, in North London, England. There were eight children in the family. He attended Alexandra Park infant school in London, but was withdrawn at the age of nine, as the family moved to Coventry, where he attended Hillfarm Junior School and began studies at Barkers Butts Secondary School.

== Musical career ==
In 1972, McCalla dropped out of school to work with a band called Black and White Notes. They gigged and eventually supported The Shadows.

In 1972, McCalla left his family in Coventry to move to London.

In 1976, he joined Moon, who were signed to Epic Records, releasing two albums, Too Close for Comfort and Turning the Tides, and made 4 appearances on the John Peel Show. After splitting from the band, he stayed with Epic Records, releasing a solo album. In July 1979 Epic released a single from this album, "Ain't Nothing But a House Party", which is a disco-era reworking of The Showstoppers hit dating from 1967. The flipside of that single was "Midnight Girl", another track from the album.

From 1977, he worked as a backing vocalist for Sniff 'n' the Tears. During this time, he worked as a freelance musician and made a solo album Night Time Emotion in 1979 produced by Trevor Rabin. He sang on Mike Rutherford's first solo album Smallcreep's Day in 1979, and on Morrissey–Mullen's 1985 This Must Be the Place. In 1985 he joined Partners In Crime with former Status Quo drummer John Coghlan, releasing one album, Organised Crime.

By 1981, he had decided to form his own band, which he had named Contact. They played a series of gigs, producing a cassette. In 1993, the band's name changed to McCalla, and they released “Push and Pull”, followed by “Hot from the Smoke" in 1995. In 1986 he worked as a vocalist for the jazz-rock band Mezzoforte from Iceland, and sang several tracks on the album No Limits.

== Manfred Mann ==
McCalla, having done numerous studio sessions with them from 1980 became steadily involved with Manfred Mann's Earth Band in 1990, featuring on the Plains Music album, and thereafter toured extensively with them, also featuring on the studio albums Soft Vengeance and 2006, and the live album Mann Alive. He was replaced as the band's vocalist by Peter Cox, best known for his work as lead singer of Go West.

From mid-2006, he collaborated with jazz band Dave Lewis 1Up.

== Some Kinda Wonderful ==
McCalla is the featured vocalist alongside saxophonist Derek Nash in this band dedicated to performing the music of Stevie Wonder. Touring extensively in the UK the band is hugely popular and after a few years of clubs and pubs are now playing large theatres. An album, The Music of Stevie Wonder, was released in 2021 on Jazzizit records.

== X-Factor ==
His fifteen-year-old son Mali Michael-McCalla competed for a place in the fifth series of the UK talent competition X-Factor in 2008, but did not progress to the Live Final stages.
