= Irene Chanter =

British singer

Irene Chanter is a British singer best known for her career as a member of the Chanter Sisters and for her work as a session singer, working with a number of musicians in the 1970s and 1980s.

Chanter has worked with Elton John, Long John Baldry, Phil Manzanera, Roxy Music, John Miles, Chris Farlowe, John Cale, Junior Campbell, Ronnie Wood, Manfred Mann's Earth Band, Baker Gurvitz Army, Caravan, Pink Floyd, The Undertones, Rod Stewart, David Coverdale, James Last, Robert Wyatt and Whitesnake. Chanter has two children and five grandchildren.
