= Matt Irving =

Scottish musician (1950–2015)

- Born: 16 March 1950; Glasgow, Scotland
- Died: 3 April 2015 (aged 65)
- Occupations: Singer; songwriter
- Instruments: Keyboards; accordion; bass guitar; vocals

Matt Irving (16 March 1950 – 3 April 2015) was a Scottish singer and musician who played keyboards, accordion, and bass guitar.

Irving was the bass guitar player for Manfred Mann's Earth Band between 1981 and 1986. He featured on the albums Somewhere in Afrika (1982) and Budapest Live (1984). Since leaving the band he has guested (on keyboards) with the Lords of the New Church, Squeeze, Chris Rea, Paul Young, and former Pink Floyd musician Roger Waters. He also wrote the song "Some Conversation"' on the Wishbone Ash album Strange Affair (1991).

Irving was also an integral part of the Tex-Mex band Los Pacaminos on vocals, keyboards and accordion.

Irving died in 2015 due to prostate cancer.
