= Soft Vengeance =

Studio album by Manfred Mann's Earth Band
- Released: 3 June 1996
- Recorded: Workhouse Studios, Old Kent Road, London, 1992–1996
- Genre: Rock; Hard rock Progressive rock
- Length: 54:05
- Label: Grapevine
- Producer: Manfred Mann; Richard James Burgess

Manfred Mann's Earth Band chronology
Plains Music (1991)	Soft Vengeance (1996)	Mann Alive (1998)

Professional ratings
Review scores
Source	Rating
Allmusic	(not rated)

Soft Vengeance is an album released in 1996 by Manfred Mann's Earth Band.

== Track listing ==
1. "Pleasure and Pain" (Mike Chapman, Holly Knight) – 5:39
2. "Play with Fire" (Mick Jagger, Keith Richards) – 3:58
3. "Nothing Ever Happens" (Justin Currie) – 4:10
4. "Shelter from the Storm" (Bob Dylan) – 6:06
5. "Tumbling Ball" (Mark Spiro) – 5:35
6. "The Price I Pay" (Robert Cray, Dennis Walker) – 4:06
7. "Lose the Touch" (Cyril Schumann) – 3:31
8. "Adults Only" (Manfred Mann) – 3:36
9. "Wherever Love Drops (Part One)" (Mann, Russell Hoban) – 1:05
10. "The Complete History of Sexual Jealousy" (Nick Currie) – 3:30
11. "99 lbs" (Dannie Bryant) – 2:38
12. "Miss You" (Cyril Schumann) – 3:33
13. "Nature of the Beast" (Doc Neeson, Geoffrey Leib) – 4:35
14. "Wherever Love Drops (Part Two)" (Mann, Hoban, Anthony Moore) – 2:00

== Singles ==
- 1996 - Nothing Ever Happens
1. "Nothing Ever Happens (Radio Mix)" (Currie) – 3:39
2. "Nothing Ever Happens (TV Mix)" (Currie) – 4:52
3. "Shelter from The Storm" (Bob Dylan) – 6:06
4. "Adults Only" (Instrumental) (Manfred Mann) – 3:36
- 1996 - Pleasure and Pain

== Personnel ==
- Manfred Mann - keyboards, programming
- Mick Rogers - guitars
- Dave Farmer - drums
- Clive Bunker - drums
- Steve Kinch - bass
- Chris Thompson - vocals
- Noel McCalla - vocals

with

- Russell Hoban - speech on "Wherever Love Drops"
- Richard Marcangelo - drums
- Richard James Burgess - drums
- Gavin Harrison - drums
- Andy Pask - bass
- Tony Patler - bass
- Gary Farmer - guitar
- Clem Clempson - guitar
- Mitch Dalton - guitar
- Tony Patler - guitar
- Gary Sanctuary - Wurlitzer electric piano on "99lbs"
- Linda Taylor - backing vocals
- Maggie Ryder - backing vocals
- Carol Kenyon - backing vocals
- Janice Hoyte - backing vocals
- Diane Byrch - backing vocals
- Stevie Lange - backing vocals

== Charts ==
Chart (1996)	Peak position
German Albums (Offizielle Top 100)	65
Norwegian Albums (VG-lista)	22
