= Criminal Tango =

Studio album by Manfred Mann's Earth Band with Chris Thompson
- Released: 13 June 1986
- Recorded: 1984–1986
- Studio: Workhouse Studios, Old Kent Road, London
- Genre: Pop rock; new wave; synth-pop
- Length: 37:34
- Label: 10/Virgin (Canada, Germany original release); Cohesion (Canada, Germany 1999 reissue)
- Producer: Manfred Mann, Steve Forward

Manfred Mann's Earth Band chronology
Budapest Live (1984)	Criminal Tango (1986)	Masque (1987)

Singles from Criminal Tango
- 1. "Do Anything You Wanna Do" Released: March 1986; 2. "Going Underground" Released: June 1986

Professional ratings
Review scores
Source	Rating
AllMusic	(not rated)
The Encyclopedia of Popular Music	3/5 stars

Criminal Tango is the twelfth studio album released in 1986 by Manfred Mann's Earth Band with Chris Thompson. Founding guitarist/vocalist Mick Rogers returned to the band for this album and is still an active member. The new bassist Steve Kinch joined the band only when parts of the album were already recorded. Kinch therefore shared the bass parts on this album with bassists Durban Betancourt-Laverde and John Giblin. This is their first album for the Virgin Records label after eleven years with Bronze Records.

== Track listing ==
=== Side one ===
1. "Going Underground" (Paul Weller) – 5:18
2. "Who Are The Mystery Kids?" (Manfred Mann, Garland Jeffreys) – 3:44
3. "Banquet" (Joni Mitchell) – 5:17
4. "Killer On The Loose" (Denny Newman) – 3:59

=== Side two ===
5. "Do Anything You Wanna Do" (Graham Douglas, Edwin Hollis) – 4:14
6. "Rescue" (Mann, Mick Rogers) – 2:59
7. "You Got Me Right Through The Heart" (Robert Byrne) – 3:53
8. "Bulldog" (John Lennon, Paul McCartney) – 4:23
9. "Crossfire" (Mann, Rogers, John Lingwood) – 3:47

=== Bonus Tracks (1999 CD re-issue) ===
10. "Runner" (12" version) (Ian Thomas) – 4:39
11. "Rebel" (U.S. single version) (Reg Laws) – 4:08
12. "Do Anything You Wanna Do" (12" version) (Douglas, Hollis) – 6:28
13. "Going Underground" (alternate single version) (Weller) – 3:01

== Personnel ==
The Earth Band

- Manfred Mann – keyboards
- John Lingwood – drums, percussion
- Mick Rogers – guitar, vocals
- Chris Thompson – lead vocals
- Steve Kinch – bass
- Durban Betancourt-Laverde – bass

Additional musicians

- John Giblin – bass

Technical

- Manfred Mann, Steve Forward – producers
- Terry Medhurst – engineer
- Pete Hammond – engineer
- Nigel Gilroy, Stuart Barry – assistant engineers
- Roddy Matthews – mixing engineer (track 4)
- The Leisure Process – cover design
- Re-mastered by: Robert M. Corich and Mike Brown

== Charts ==
Chart (1986)	Peak position
Austrian Albums (Ö3 Austria)	26
German Albums (Offizielle Top 100)	17
Norwegian Albums (VG-lista)	7
Swedish Albums (Sverigetopplistan)	18
Swiss Albums (Schweizer Hitparade)	5
