= Odds & Sods – Mis-takes & Out-takes =

Box set by Manfred Mann's Earth Band
- Released: September 2005
- Recorded: 1972–2005
- Genre: Rock; Hard rock Progressive rock
- Label: Cohesion
- Producer: Manfred Mann; Various

Manfred Mann's Earth Band chronology
| 2006 (2004) | Odds & Sods – Mis-takes & Out-takes (2005) |

Professional ratings
Review scores
| Source | Rating |
|---|---|
| AllMusic | 4/5 stars |

Odds & Sods – Mis-takes & Out-takes is a four-CD box set compilation album released in 2005 by Manfred Mann's Earth Band. It features alternate takes, outtakes and other assorted rarities, recorded over the 35-year career of the band.

== Track listing ==
CD1 In The Beginning

1. "Happy Being Me" (1970)
2. "Travelling Lady" (1969)
3. "Messin' Up The Land" (previously unreleased version) (1970)
4. "Fish" (previously unreleased) (1970)
5. "Turn You Away From My Door" (previously unreleased) (1970)
6. "Ashes To The Wind" (previously unreleased version) (1971)
7. "Ned Kelly" (previously unreleased) (1971)
8. "Please Mrs Henry" (previously unreleased version) (1971)
9. "Jump Sturdy" (previously unreleased version) (1971)
10. "Holly Holy" (previously unreleased) (1971)
11. "Tribute" (1971)
12. "Ain't No Crime" (previously unreleased) (1971)
13. "In The Beginning" (1973)
14. "Joybringer" (1973)
15. "Be Not Too Hard" (1974)

CD2 Hollywood Town

1. "Blinded By The Light" (Single Edit) (1976)
2. "Spirits In The Night" (Chris Thompson Vocals Version) (1976)
3. "Living Without You" (1971)
4. "Pretty Good" (American only release) (1975)
5. "California Coastline" (1972)
6. "Hollywood Town" (1979)
7. "Chicago Institute" (1977)
8. "Quit Your Low Down Ways" (American only release) (1975)
9. "California" (Single Edit) (1977)
10. "Runner" (1984)
11. "Summer In The City" (previously unreleased) (1987)
12. "Rebel" (American only release) (1984)
13. "Salmon Fishing" (First released in States) (1992)

CD3 Brothers and Sisters

1. "Redemption Song" (live) (1984)
2. "Singing The Dolphin Through" (1976)
3. "For You" (Single Edit) (1981)
4. "I (Who Have Nothing)" (featuring Shona Laing) (Single release only) (1982)
5. "Redemption Song" (Single Version) (1982)
6. "Africa Suite (1982) a) Brothers and Sisters of Africa b) To Bantustan c) Koze Kobenini (How Long Must We Wait?) d) Lalela [uncredited]"
7. "War Dream" (B-side of single only) (1982)
8. "Heart On The Street" (1981)
9. "Telegram To Monica" (1987)
10. "All Through The Night" (previously unreleased) (1988)
11. "Better Place" (previously unreleased) (1996)
12. "Demolition Man" (live) (in memory of Steve Waller) (1984)
13. "Martha's Madman" (live) (1998)

CD4 To The Limit

1. "Instrumedicine Song" (1990)
2. "Geronimo's Cadillac" (previously unreleased version) (1993)
3. "Tumbling Ball" (previously unreleased version) (1996)
4. "Lead Me To Water" (previously unreleased) (1993)
5. "To The Limit" (previously unreleased) (1993)
6. "Don't Let Me Down" (previously unreleased) (1993)
7. "Nature Of The Beast" (previously unreleased version) (1993)
8. "Pleasure and Pain" (previously unreleased version – live) (1993)
9. "Dirty City" (previously unreleased – live) (1993)
10. "Don't Let It Bring You Down (Castles Burning)" (listed as Don't Bring Me Down on CD cover and booklet) (previously unreleased – live) (2001)
11. "SOS" (previously unreleased – live) (2001)
12. "Davy's On The Road Again" (previously unreleased live version) (2001)
13. "Hillbrow" (previously unreleased – from 2006 recordings) (2002)

== Personnel ==
- Manfred Mann – keyboards and vocals

with various Manfred Mann's Earth Band members 1972–2005
