= Manfred Mann Chapter Three =

British experimental jazz rock band (1969–1971)

- Manfred Mann Chapter Three in 1970

Background information
- Genre: Jazz rock
- Years active: 1969–1971
- Label: Vertigo
- Past members: Manfred Mann; Mike Hugg; Bernie Living; Steve York; Craig Collinge

Manfred Mann Chapter Three were a British experimental jazz rock band founded by two former members of the band Manfred Mann, their namesake South African keyboardist Manfred Mann and drummer Mike Hugg, though Hugg would be a singer and keyboardist with Chapter Three. The band's name was a reference to the earlier band, who had existed in two incarnations, the first with Paul Jones as singer, the second with Mike d'Abo as singer.

The line-up for its debut at Newcastle's Mayfair Ballroom on 24 October 1969 was Hugg (vocals/electric piano), Mann (organ), Bernie Living (alto sax), Steve York (bass) and Craig Collinge (drums), augmented by a five-piece brass section of Clive Stevens (tenor sax), Carl Griffiths (tenor sax), Dave Coxhill (baritone sax), Gerald Drewett (trombone) and Sonny Corbett (trumpet).

The band released two studio albums but shelved a third. A tour of Australia and New Zealand in April and May 1971 with Deep Purple and Free was cut short after an altercation with the promoter. The band flew back to England two weeks early and broke up. Mann went on to form Manfred Mann's Earth Band later that year.

== Albums ==
Year	Album	UK albums	US albums	Additional information
1969	Manfred Mann Chapter Three	-	-	Catalogue No. Vertigo VO 3
1970	Manfred Mann Chapter Three Volume Two	-	-	Catalogue No. Vertigo 6360 012
