= Colin Pattenden =

English bass guitarist (born 1947)

- Born: Colin Roy Pattenden; November 1947 (age 78); Farnborough, Kent, England, U.K.
- Genres: Rock
- Occupation: Bass guitarist
- Instruments: Bass, vocals
- Member of: The Nashville Teens
- Formerly of: Mungo Jerry, Manfred Mann's Earth Band

Colin Roy Pattenden (born November 1947, Farnborough, Kent, England) is an English bass guitarist, chiefly known for his membership of Manfred Mann's Earth Band.

== Career ==
Pattenden was taught guitar but learned to play bass from tuition books, chiefly those of Carol Kaye, the American bassist guru. Pattenden worked as a session guitarist for Engelbert Humperdinck and Leapy Lee in the 1960s.

He played in Manfred Mann's Earth Bandfrom its formation in 1971. Pattenden featured on seven Earth Band albums from their debut in 1972 to The Roaring Silence in 1976. Pattenden quit MMEB in 1977. In 1978, he teamed up with former Manfred Mann's Earth Band drummer Chris Slade and vocalist Peter Cox, in the short lived Terra Nova.

He has also played with Mungo Jerry, The King Earl Boogie Band, The Jackie Lynton Band, and The Nashville Teens.

In 2013 he was reportedly working as a PR consultant and manages CP Sound Limited an audio system and lighting design and installation company.
