= Aeroman =

Aeroman may refer to:

- An airline maintenance company, the El Salvadoran subsidiary of Aveos
- A nickname for Mike Segura
- A character found in the novel The Fortress of Solitude (novel)
- Spanish airline Aeródromo De La Mancha (callsign AEROMAN)
- AER Oman; see List of energy regulatory bodies

== See also ==
- Airman (disambiguation)
- Aviator (disambiguation)
