= Aviator (disambiguation) =

An aviator is a person who flies aircraft.

Aviator may also refer to:

== Films ==
- The Aviator (1929 film), a comedy film considered lost
- The Aviator (1985 film), an adventure film starring Christopher Reeve
- The Aviator (2004 film), a biopic based on the life of entrepreneur Howard Hughes

== Music ==
- Aviator (British band), a late 1970s progressive rock band
  - Aviator (Aviator album), Aviator's first album
- Aviator (Ukrainian band), pop band formed in 2005
- Aviator (Funker Vogt album), a 2007 album by Funker Vogt
- "The Aviator", a song by Deep Purple from their 1996 album Purpendicular
- The Aviator (soundtrack), the original soundtrack album of the 2004 film The Aviator

== Other uses ==
- Aviator, a 1983 computer game by Geoff Crammond
- Aviator, a brand of playing cards made by the United States Playing Card Company
- Aviator (rank), a rank within the Royal Canadian Air Force
- Aviators, former Frequent Flyer Program of Trans World Airlines
- Honda Aviator, a motor scooter made by Honda Motorcycle and Scooter India Pvt. Ltd.
- Lincoln Aviator, an SUV
- Ray-Ban Aviator, a style of sunglasses
- Shenzhen Aviators, a Chinese basketball team
- The Aviator (short story), a 1926 short story by Antoine de Saint-Exupéry
- The Aviator (Charlottesville, Virginia), a sculpture by Gutzon Borglum
- Las Vegas Aviators, a minor league baseball team
