= Turbulence (Aviator album) =

Studio album by Aviator
- Released: 1980
- Studios: Morgan Studios, London; Startling Studios, Ascot, Berkshire; Roundhouse Studios, London
- Genre: Rock / prog
- Label: Harvest
- Producer: Will Malone

Aviator chronology
Aviator (1979)	Turbulence (1980)

Turbulence is the second and last album by the rock band Aviator.

== Track listing ==
All tracks composed by Aviator; except where indicated

1. "Way of the World" (4:53)
2. "The American" (4:40)
3. "Turbulence" (6:44)
4. "Ovation" (4:54)
5. "Fallen Star" (7:22)
6. "Track Eleven" (1:33)
7. "Get Your Rocks Off" (Bob Dylan) (5:01)
8. "Strange Worlds" (7:01)

== Personnel ==
Aviator

- Mick Rogers - guitar, lead vocals
- John G. Perry - bass guitar, vocals, pedal keyboard
- Clive Bunker - drums, percussion, vocals

with:

- Betsy Cook, Vivienne McAuliffe, Carol Stocker - backing vocals

Technical

- Mike Hedges - engineer
- Martyn Webster - engineer
- David Kemp - engineer
- Mark Lawrence - photography
- Wil Malone - producer
