= Ford CD6 platform =

American car platform

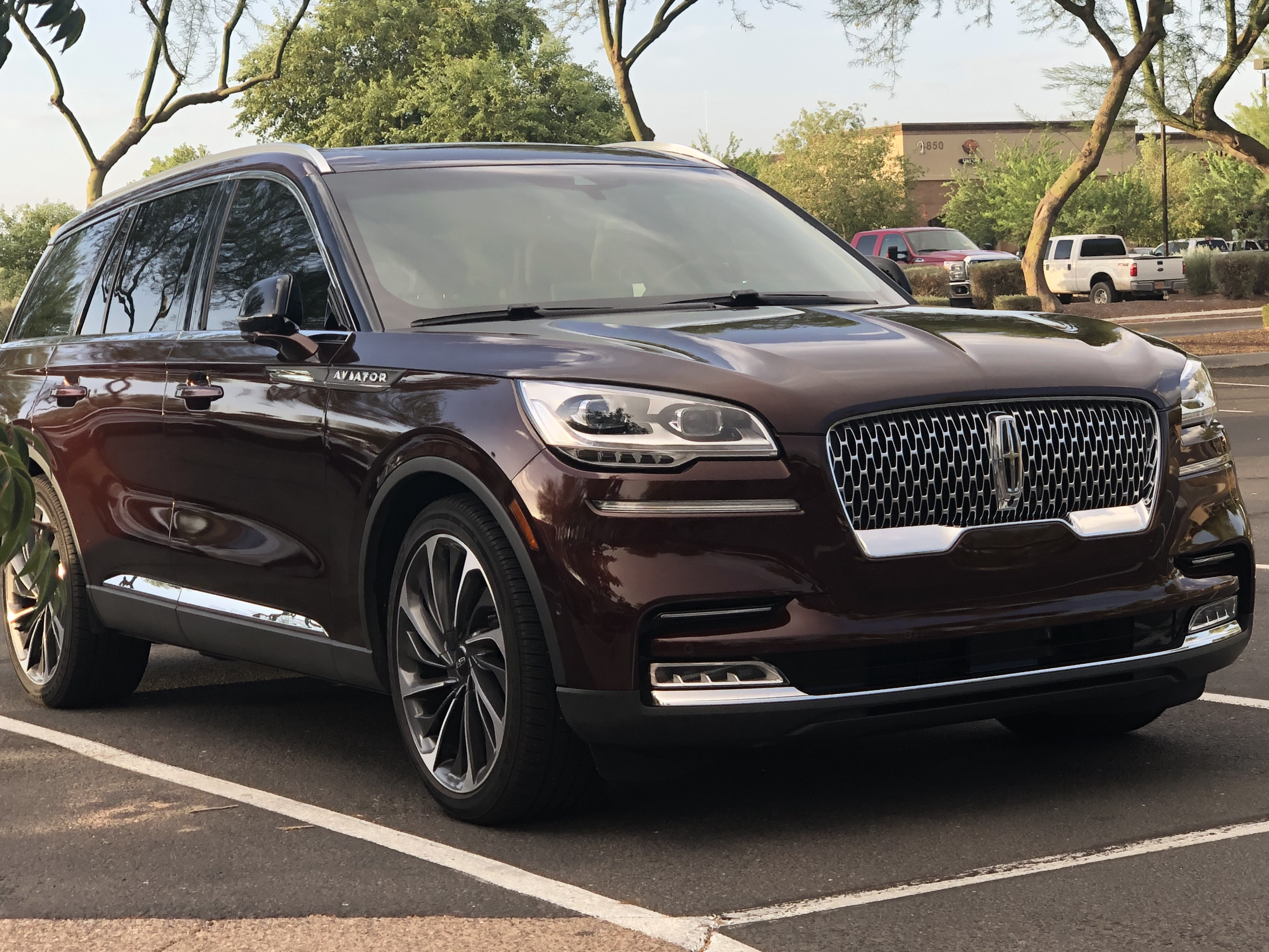
- 2020 Lincoln Aviator, a vehicle on the Ford CD6 platform

Overview
- Production: May 6, 2019 – present
- Assembly: Chicago, Illinois, United States (Chicago Assembly)

Body and chassis
- Class: Mid-size CUV
- Layout: Longitudinal Front engine, rear-wheel drive / all-wheel drive
- Body style(s): 5-door SUV

Powertrain
- Engine(s): 2.3-liter EcoBoost turbocharged I4; 3.0-liter EcoBoost twin turbocharged V6; 3.3-liter Cyclone V6 Hybrid; 3.0-liter EcoBoost twin-turbo V6 Plug-In Hybrid
- Transmission(s): Ford 10R80 10-speed automatic

Dimensions
- Wheelbase: 119.1 in (3,025 mm)
- Length: 198.8 in (5,050 mm) (Explorer); 199.3 in (5,062 mm) (Aviator)
- Width: 78.9 in (2,004 mm)(Explorer); 79.6 in (2,022 mm) (Aviator)
- Height: 69.9 in (1,775 mm) (Explorer); 69.6 in (1,768 mm) (Aviator)
- Curb weight: 4,345–4,727 lb (1,971–2,144 kg)

Chronology
- Predecessor: Ford D3 platform

The Ford CD6 platform is an automobile platform made by Ford Motor Company since 2019.

== Vehicles ==
- Ford Explorer (sixth generation) (2020–present)
- Lincoln Aviator (second generation) (2020–present)
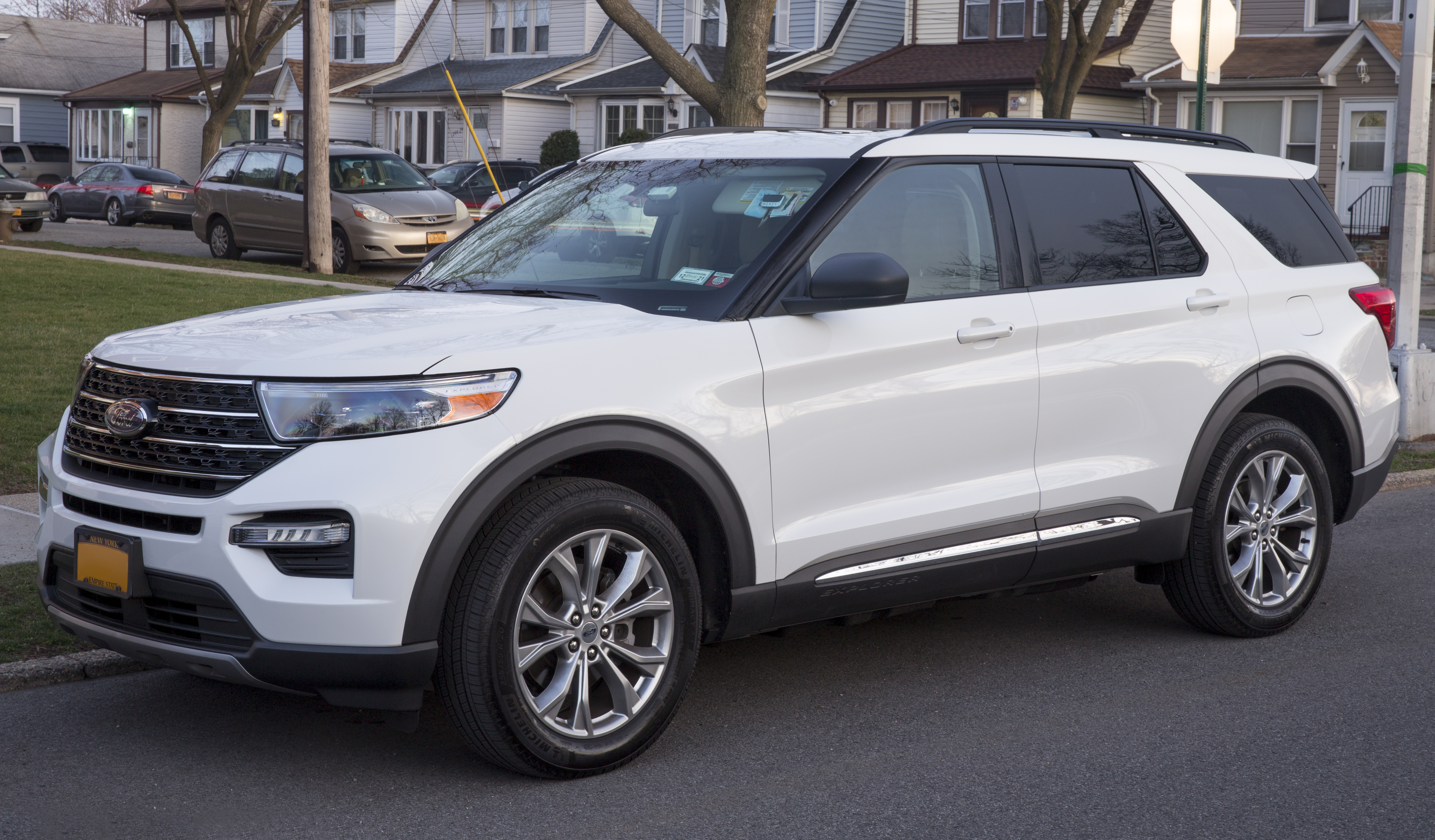
Ford Explorer

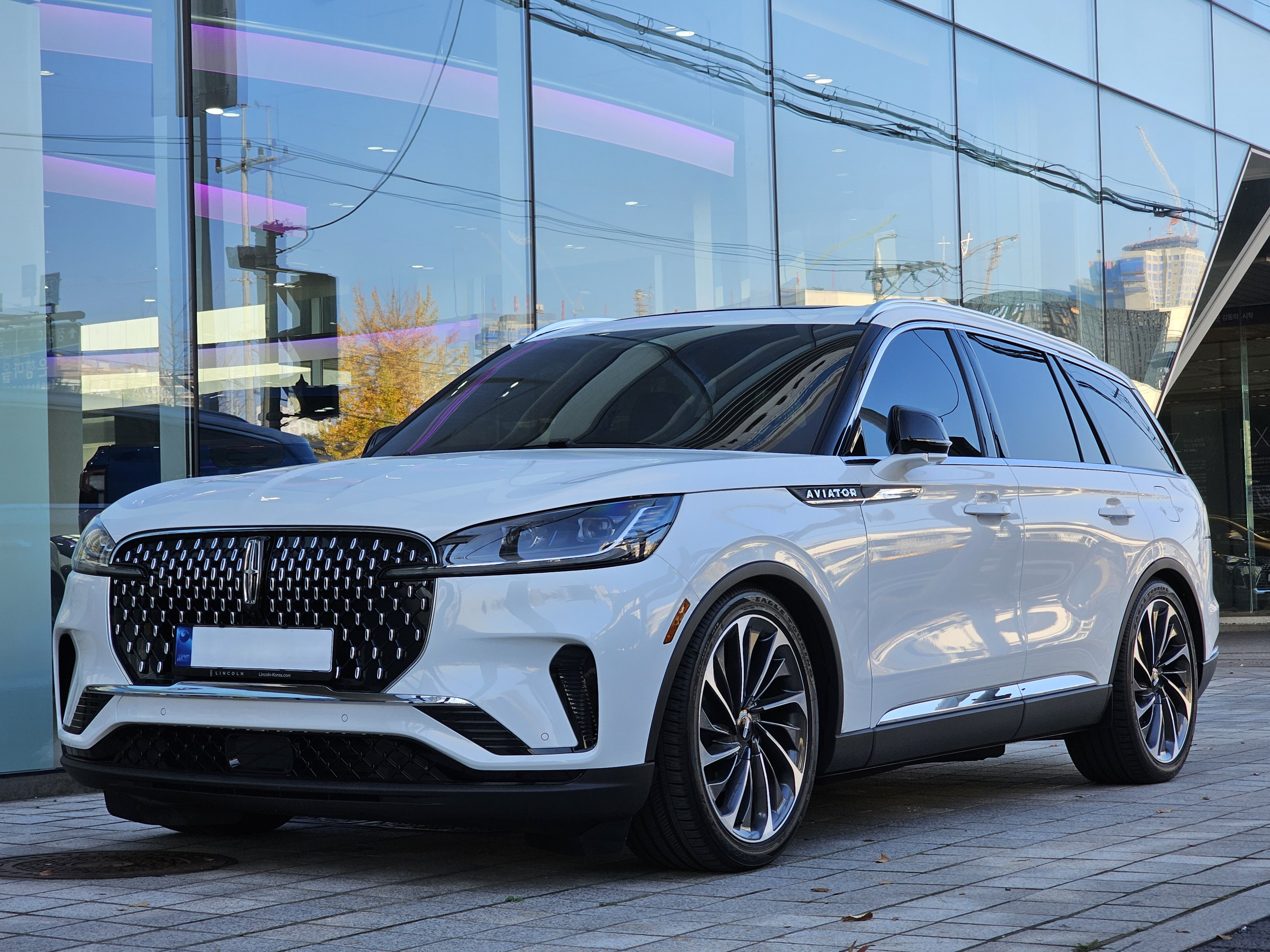
Lincoln Aviator
