= Aviator (Aviator album) =

Studio album by Aviator
- Released: 1979
- Studios: Redon Recorders; Startling Studios, Ascot, Berkshire
- Genre: Rock / Prog
- Length: 43:32
- Labels: Harvest (UK); EMI America (USA)
- Producers: Robin Lumley, Aviator

Aviator chronology
Aviator (1979)	Turbulence (1980)

Aviator is the debut album by rock band Aviator. Released in early 1979, Aviator was co-produced by the band and Robin Lumley from the British jazz-fusion band, Brand X.

== Track listing ==
All tracks composed by Aviator

1. "Your Loving is My Home" (3:30)
2. "Keep Your Heart Right" (6:21)
3. "Evil Eye" (3:20)
4. "Time Traveller" (2:59)
5. "Silver Needles" (6:07)
6. "Cleveland Ohio" (5:01)
7. "Country Morning" (6:14)
8. "Greed" (3:02)
9. "Morning Journey" (6:58)

== Personnel ==
Aviator

- Jack Lancaster - lyricon, soprano, alto and tenor saxophones, computone, synthesizer
- Mick Rogers - guitar, vocals
- John G. Perry - bass, bass pedals, vocals
- Clive Bunker - drums, percussion

Technical

- David Tickle, Roger T. Wake, Stephen W. Tayler - engineer
