= Clive Bunker =

English rock drummer

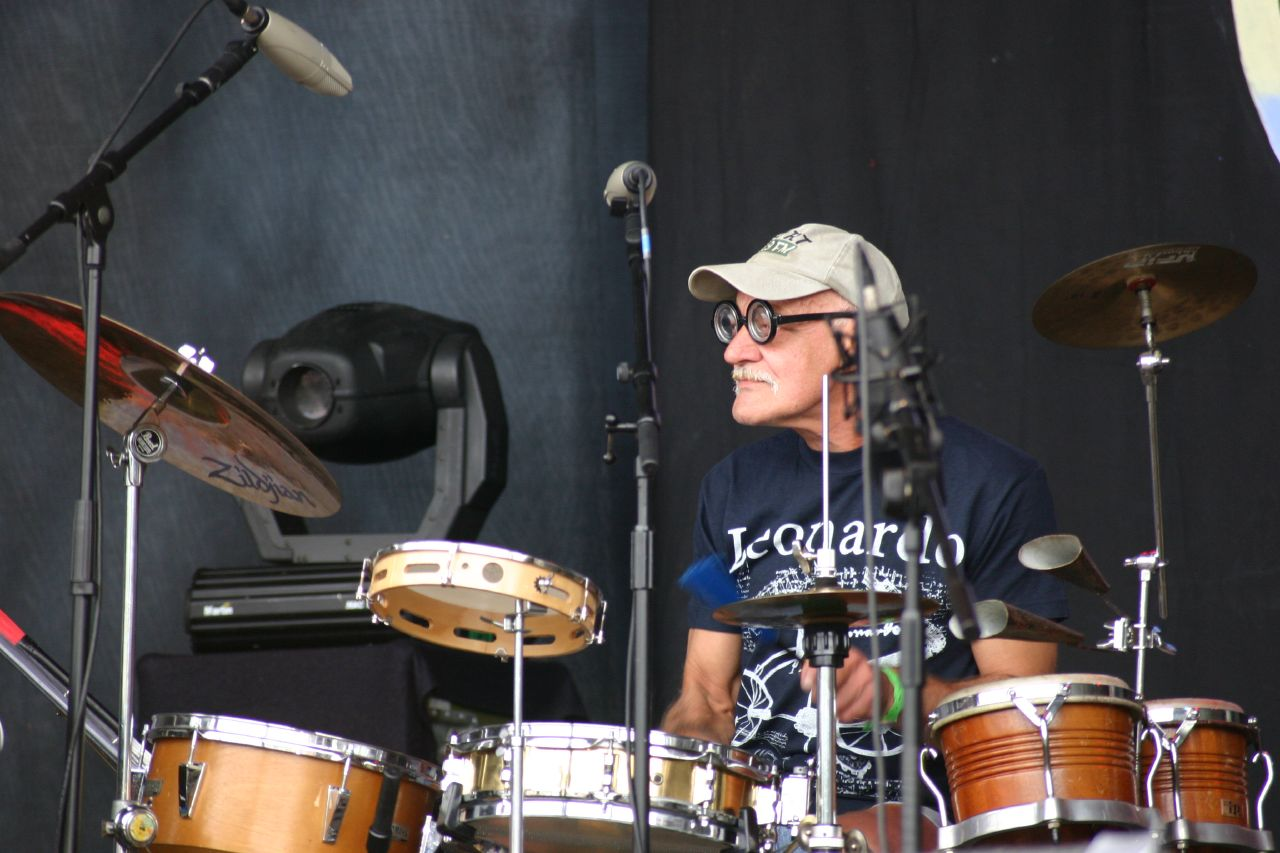
- Bunker performing at Cropredy Festival 2004

Background information
- Born: Clive William Bunker; 12 December 1946 (age 79); Luton, Bedfordshire, England
- Genres: Progressive rock; folk rock; hard rock
- Occupation: Musician
- Instrument: Drums
- Years active: 1968–present
- Formerly of: Jethro Tull; Blodwyn Pig; Camel; Manfred Mann's Earth Band; Aviator; Foskett

Clive William Bunker (born 12 December 1946) is an English rock drummer. He is best known as the original drummer of Jethro Tull, playing in the band from 1967 until 1971. Never a self-professed technical drummer, Bunker engaged with the essence of blues and rock 'n' roll, influenced by Ginger Baker and Mitch Mitchell. He was also inspired by Buddy Rich and The Hollies' Bobby Elliott.

== Career ==
=== Early career ===
Bunker was born in Luton, Bedfordshire, and played in his first band The Warriors in the 1960s. With Mick Abrahams he later formed the band known as McGregor's Engine. In this early career, playing in small venues, Bunker had an extraordinary non-matching drum kit, composed of bits and pieces of various manufacturers’ equipment. Bunker briefly played in freakbeat group The Toggery Five.

=== Jethro Tull ===
Between 1967 and 1971, he drummed for Jethro Tull. He left after the band released its most popular album to that date, Aqualung, to get married and spend more time with his new wife. He was replaced by Barriemore Barlow, a school friend of the group's singer/songwriter Ian Anderson. Bunker said about his decision to leave Jethro Tull while its success was growing:

"I had always told Ian, 'If I find the right lady, I'll be gone,' and I did just that. That was just at the start of their world touring in '72, and I wouldn't have been back in England for ages at a time. So I thought that I might as well end it then. Besides, Barrie was always in the background anyway, so I knew I wasn't going to put them in a difficult situation. You must understand that back then, we didn't have any time off; it was non-stop work, and I wanted to spend time with my wife."

=== Later career ===
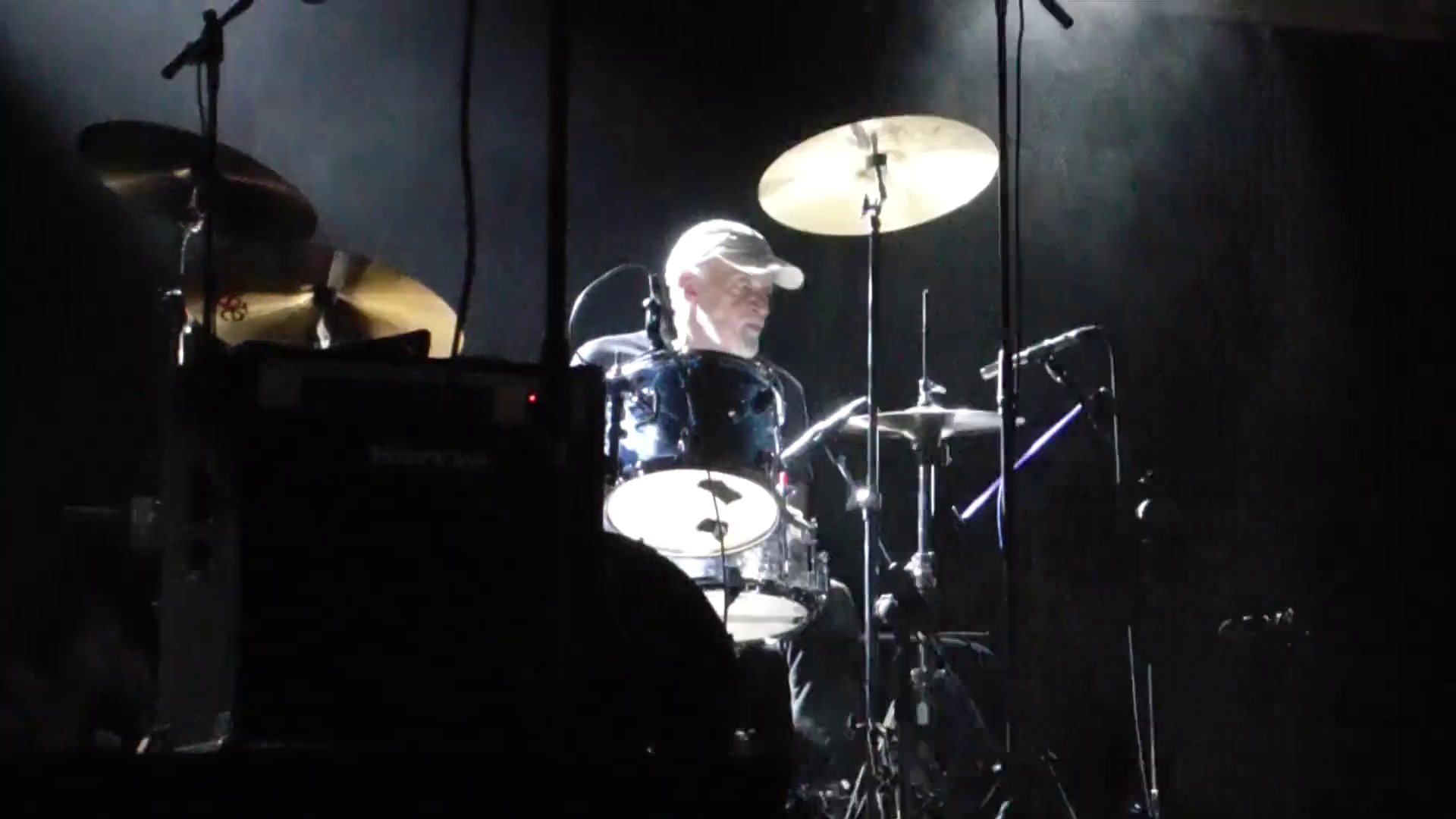
Bunker performing in 2016

After Jethro Tull, Bunker recorded and performed as a session musician with a variety of acts, including Blodwyn Pig, Robin Trower, Steve Howe, Manfred Mann's Earth Band, Jack Bruce, Gordon Giltrap, Uli Jon Roth, Electric Sun, Steve Hillage, Solstice, Glenn Hughes and Jerry Donahue. He was a session musician on punk rock band Generation X's second LP Valley of the Dolls (1979).

In 1978, Bunker founded the band Aviator with Jack Lancaster, a former Blodwyn Pig bandmate. They later released two LPs: Aviator (1979), and Turbulence (1980).

Bunker's released a solo album, Awakening, in 1998.

== Discography ==
=== Solo ===
- Awakening (1998) – With Ian Anderson and Martin Barre

=== With Jethro Tull ===
- This Was (1968)
- Stand Up (1969)
- Benefit (1970)
- Aqualung (1971)
- Living in the Past (1972)

=== With Steve Howe ===
- The Steve Howe Album – Plays percussions on Cactus Boogie

=== With Generation X ===
- Valley of the dolls – Guest musician

=== With Aviator ===
- Aviator (1979)
- Turbulence (1980)

=== Steve Hillage ===
- 1976: BBC Old Grey Whistle Test 2/11/76 "Hurdy Gurdy Glissando".
- 1979: Live Herald: He played drums on the tracks "Salmon Song", "The Dervish Riff", "Castles In The Clouds" and "Hurdy Gurdy Man" These tracks were recorded on the gig which was played on 26 March 1977 in the Rainbow Theatre London.
- 2007: Green: On the 2007 reedited version, Clive plays drums on one song recorded live at The Rainbow in 1977 : "Not Fade Away (Glid Forever).

=== With Electric Sun Uli Jon Roth ===
- Beyond the Astral Skies (1985)

=== With Blodwyn Pig ===
- Lies (1994)
- Pig in the Middle (1996)
- Live At The Lafayette (1997)
- The Basement Tapes (2000)
- Live At The Marquee Club London 1974 (2002)
- All Said And Done (2011)
- Pigthology (2013)

=== With Manfred Mann's Earth Band ===
- Soft Vengeance (1996)

=== With Solstice ===
- Circles (1997)
- The Cropredy Set (2002)

=== With Beggar's Farm ===
- Diving in the Past (2005) – With ex-PFM and Acqua Fragile Italian singer Bernardo Lanzetti on vocals.
- Itullians (2007) – With ex-Jethro Tull members Mick Abrahams on guitar, Jonathan Noyce on bass and Bernardo Lanzetti on vocals.

=== With Gordon Giltrap ===
- Airwaves (1981) PVK Records – GIL 2
- Soundwaves (1982)
