= Airman (disambiguation) =

Airman is a person serving in an air force or other military aviation service.

Airman may also refer to:

- For general civilian and generic usage, see Aviator
- Airmen, a broad category of civilian aviation job titles in U.S. Federal Aviation Regulations
- Airman Magazine, the official magazine of the U.S. Air Force
- Airman (character), a superhero from Centaur Publications
- Airman (novel), a 2008 novel by Eoin Colfer
- Airman, alternate name of Irman, a village in Iran
- ST Airman, a tugboat
