= Foskett =

Foskett is a surname. Notable people with the surname include:

- Daphne Foskett (1911–1998), English art connoisseur and art writer
- Douglas John Foskett, British library and information scientist
- Jeff Foskett, guitarist and singer, worked with Brian Wilson and The Beach Boys
- Nick Foskett, Vice-Chancellor at Keele University in Staffordshire, England
- Reginald Foskett, the fourth Anglican Bishop of Penrith, England in the modern era
- Russell Foskett OBE, DFC (1917–1944), Australian flying ace of the Second World War

== See also ==
- Fosset (disambiguation)
- Fossett
