= Mercury Mountaineer =

American car model

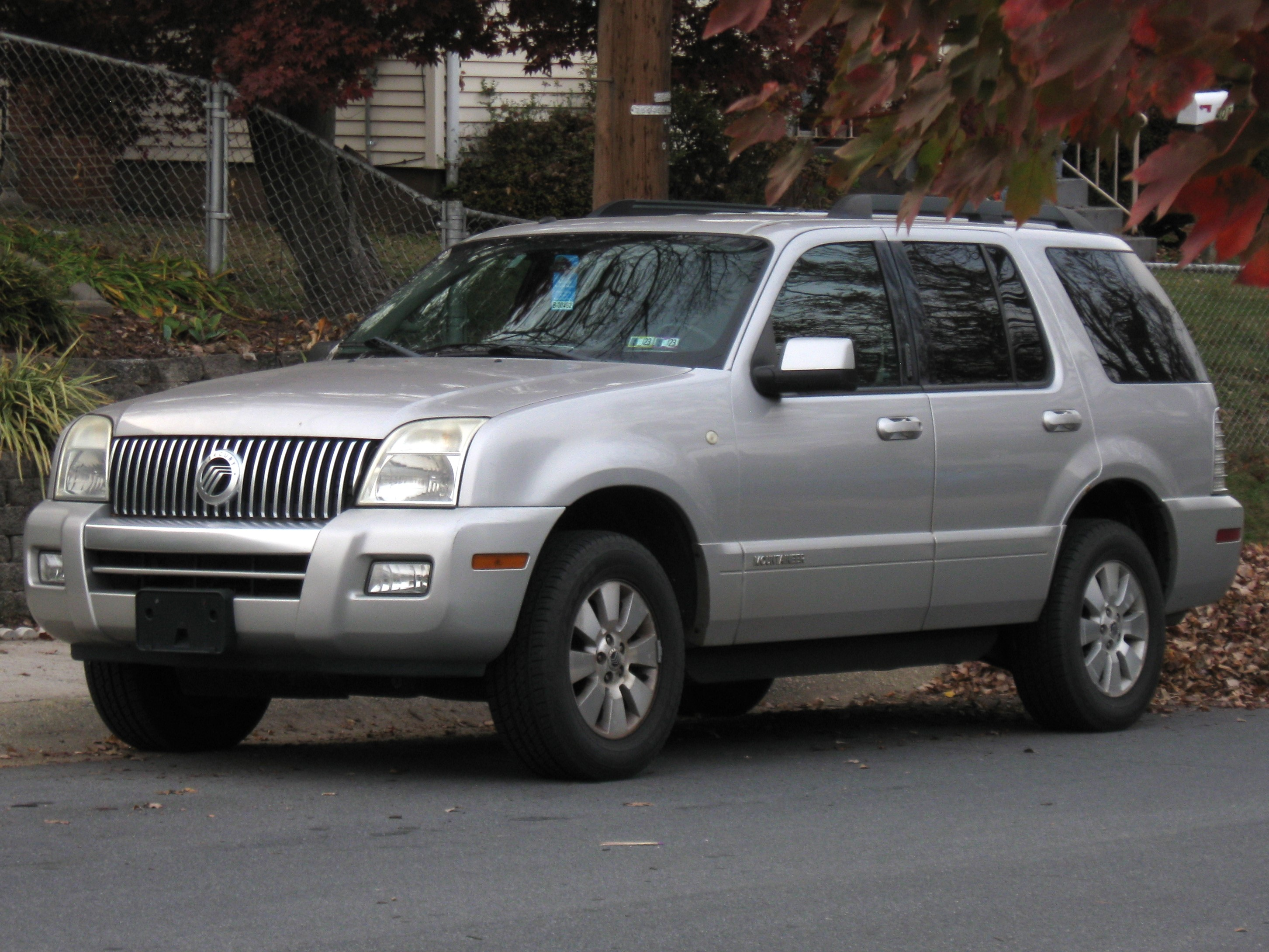

Overview
- Manufacturer: Mercury (Ford)
- Production: 1996–2010
- Model years: 1997–2010
- Assembly: Louisville, Kentucky; St. Louis, Missouri

Body and chassis
- Class: Mid-size SUV
- Body style: 5-door SUV
- Layout: Front engine, rear-wheel drive / Four-wheel drive

The Mercury Mountaineer is a mid-size luxury sport utility vehicle (SUV) that was sold by Mercury from the 1997 to 2010 model years. The first Mercury SUV, the Mountaineer was a divisional counterpart of the Ford Explorer, marketed between it and the later Lincoln Aviator.

For its three generations, the Mountaineer was produced exclusively as a 5-door wagon, with no counterpart of the 3-door Explorer Sport or the Explorer Sport Trac pickup truck.

For its entire production, the Mountaineer was assembled by Ford at its Louisville Assembly facility (Louisville, Kentucky); prior to 2007, additional production was sourced from St. Louis Assembly (Hazelwood, Missouri). After the 2010 model year, the Mountaineer was discontinued a year after the Sable was discontinued, with the Grand Marquis, Mariner, and Marquis remaining for a shortened 2011.

== Background ==
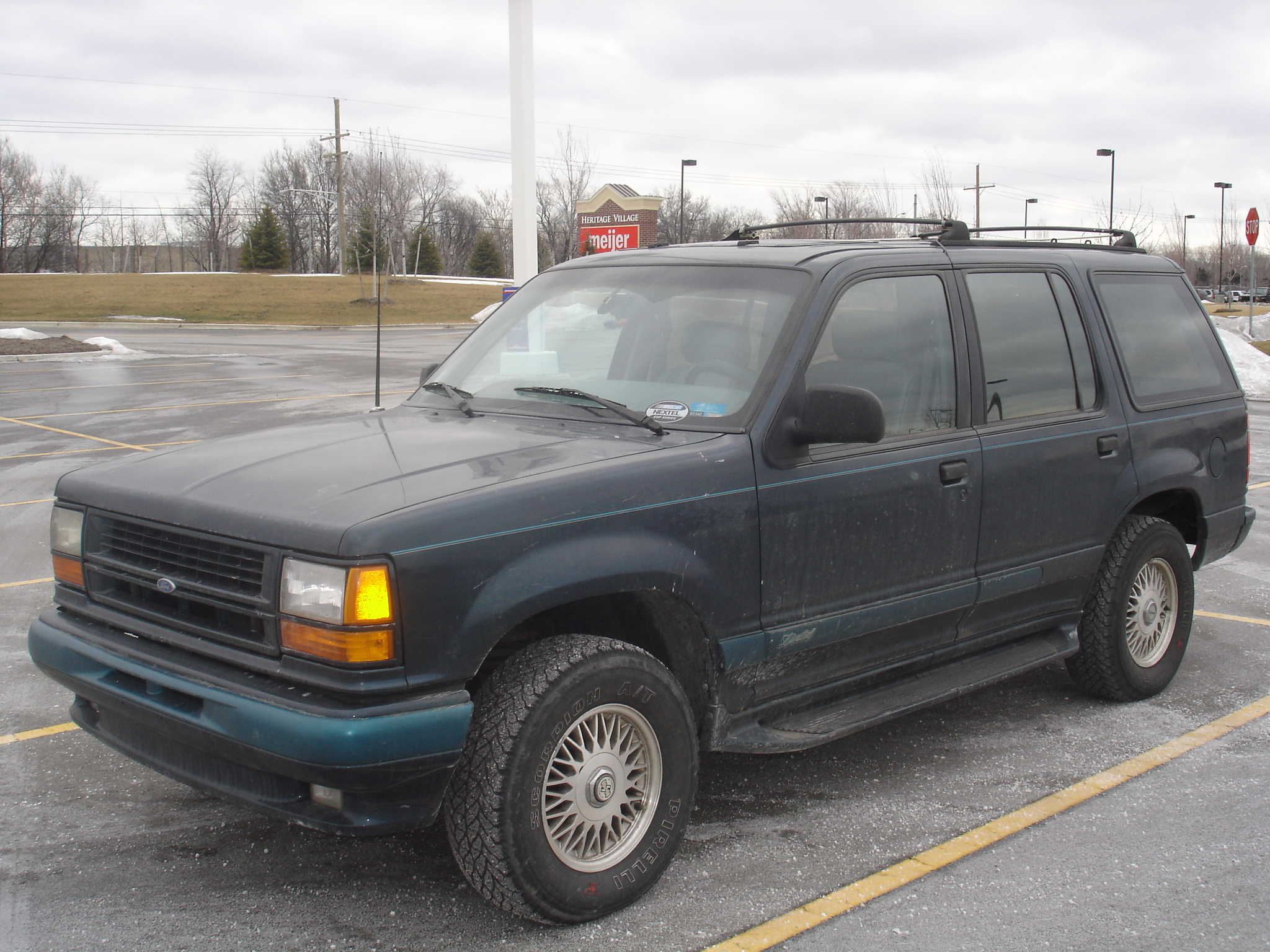
Ford Explorer Limited (1993), indirect Ford predecessor of the Mercury Mountaineer

Prior to 1991, the sole American-produced mid-size luxury SUV was the Jeep Grand Wagoneer, competing against the Range Rover and Toyota Land Cruiser. After 28 years of production, the SJ-generation Grand Wagoneer was retired (outlived in length only by the B-series Dodge Ram Van in longevity within Chrysler); the nameplate was used for 1993 to market a wood-paneled variant of the Jeep Grand Cherokee.

For 1991, General Motors released the Oldsmobile Bravada mid-size SUV, introduced a year after the creation of the five-door variant of the Chevrolet S-10 Blazer. The first premium brand to release an SUV, Oldsmobile marketed the Bravada as a competitor to the Range Rover and Toyota Land Cruiser (though far lower in price). In contrast to the S-10 Blazer/GMC Jimmy, the Bravada was fitted with the permanent all-wheel drive system of the GMC Typhoon/GMC Syclone (trading a low-range drive system for full-time drive). In extensive contrast to the traditional wood-paneled exterior of the Grand Wagoneer, Oldsmobile adopted a monochrome exterior similar to the Typhoon/Syclone.

As a response to the Bravada, both Chrysler and Ford introduced luxury mid-size SUVs for 1993. As part of the newly introduced Grand Cherokee line, Jeep reintroduced the Grand Wagoneer as an intended flagship, maintaining its leather interior and wood-paneled exterior trim, though limited sales led to its retirement after a single model year. Ford introduced the Explorer Limited as its flagship model trim, developed closer in line with the Bravada. In line with the latter, the Explorer Limited was designed with a monochromatic exterior, body-color bumpers, and exclusive aluminum wheels; for its second generation introduced for 1995, the Limited adopted an all-wheel drive system and a V8 engine.

As the 1990s progressed, the segment gained further competitors (also developed through rebranding) including the release of the Acura SLX (Isuzu Trooper), Infiniti QX4 (Nissan Pathfinder) and the larger Lexus LX450 (Toyota Land Cruiser). As these brands (along with Oldsmobile) competed more directly with luxury brands than the Ford model line, Ford Motor Company sought to develop SUVs for its Lincoln-Mercury division. To minimize model overlap between the two brands, Mercury was to sell the counterpart of the mid-size Ford Explorer (approximately the size of the Isuzu Trooper and Toyota Land Cruiser), with Lincoln marketing a version of the Ford Expedition full size SUV.

== First generation (1997–2001) ==
First generation
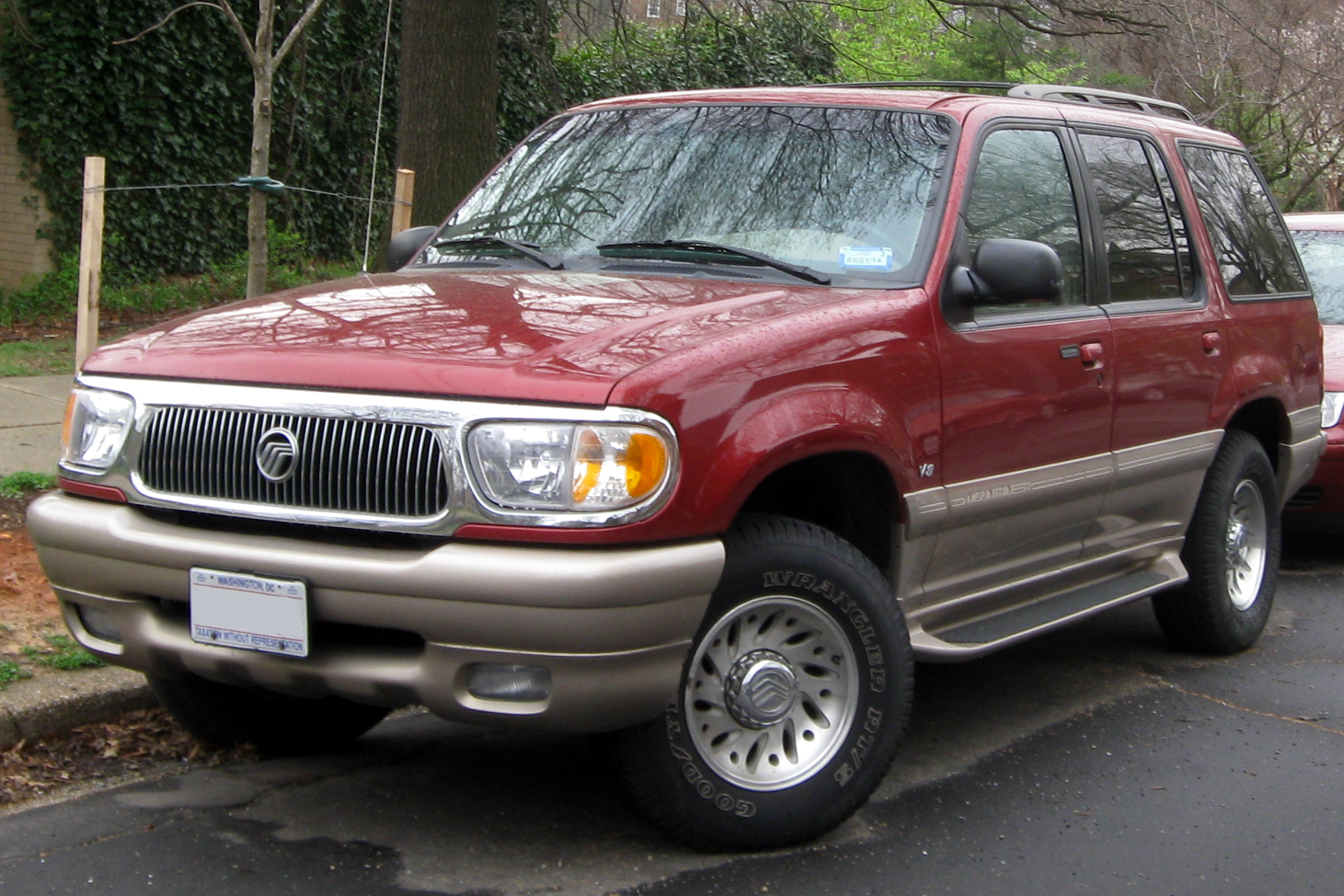
- 1998–2001 Mercury Mountaineer

Overview
- Production: April 1996–2001
- Model years: 1997–2001

Body and chassis
- Related: Ford Explorer; Ford Ranger; Mazda B-Series; Ford Explorer Sport Trac

Powertrain
- Engine: 4.0 L Cologne V6; 5.0 L Windsor V8
- Transmission: 4-speed automatic (V8 models); 5-speed automatic (V6 models)

Dimensions
- Wheelbase: 1997: 111.5 in (2,832 mm); 1998–2001: 111.6 in (2,835 mm)
- Length: 1997: 188.5 in (4,788 mm); 1998–1999: 190.1 in (4,829 mm); 2000–2001: 190.7 in (4,844 mm)
- Width: 70.2 in (1,783 mm)
- Height: 1997 2WD: 66.8 in (1,697 mm); 1997 4WD: 66.7 in (1,694 mm); 1998–2001 2WD: 70.5 in (1,791 mm); 1998–2001 4WD: 70.3 in (1,786 mm)

1997 Mercury Mountaineer (front and rear view)
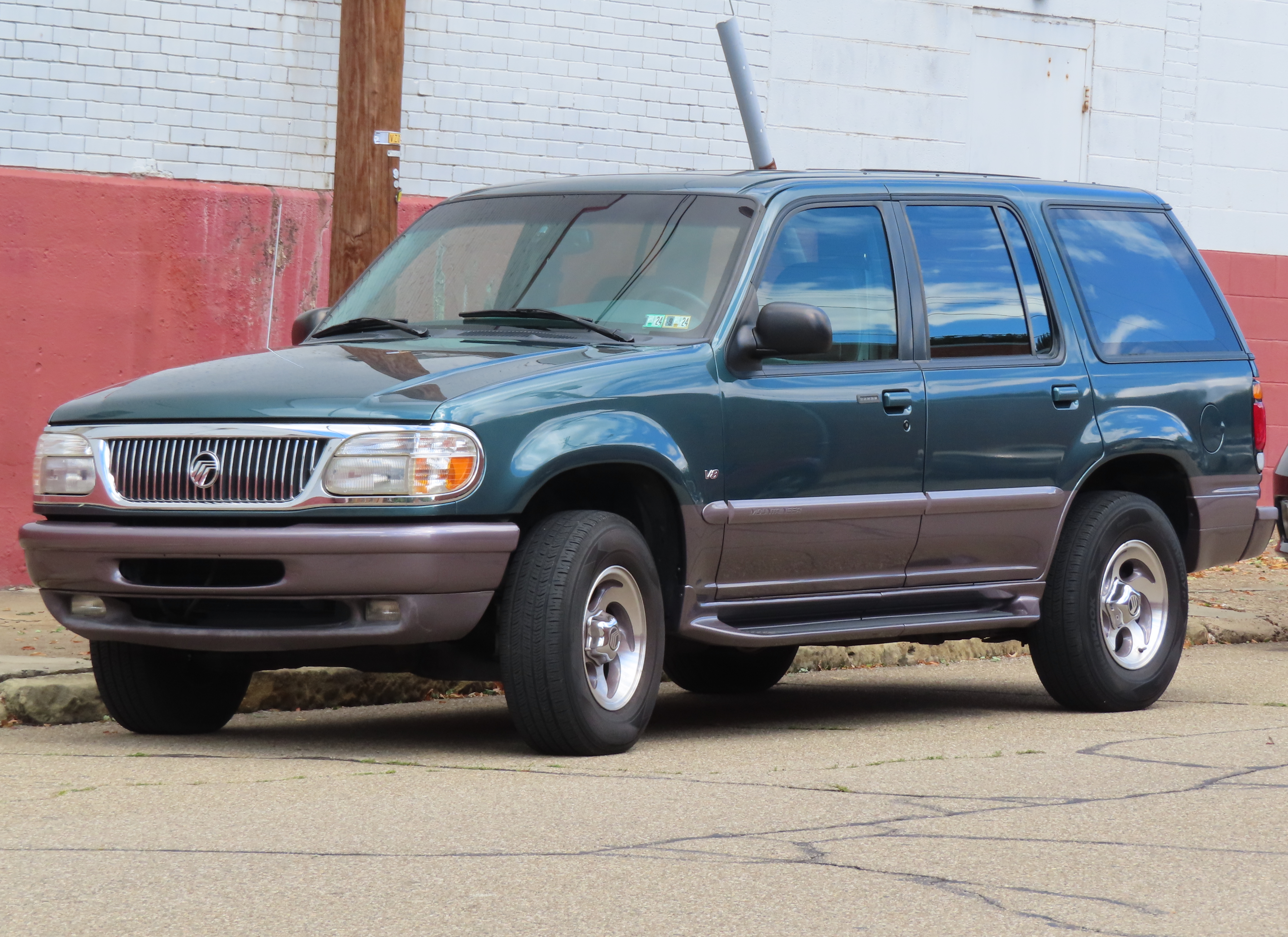
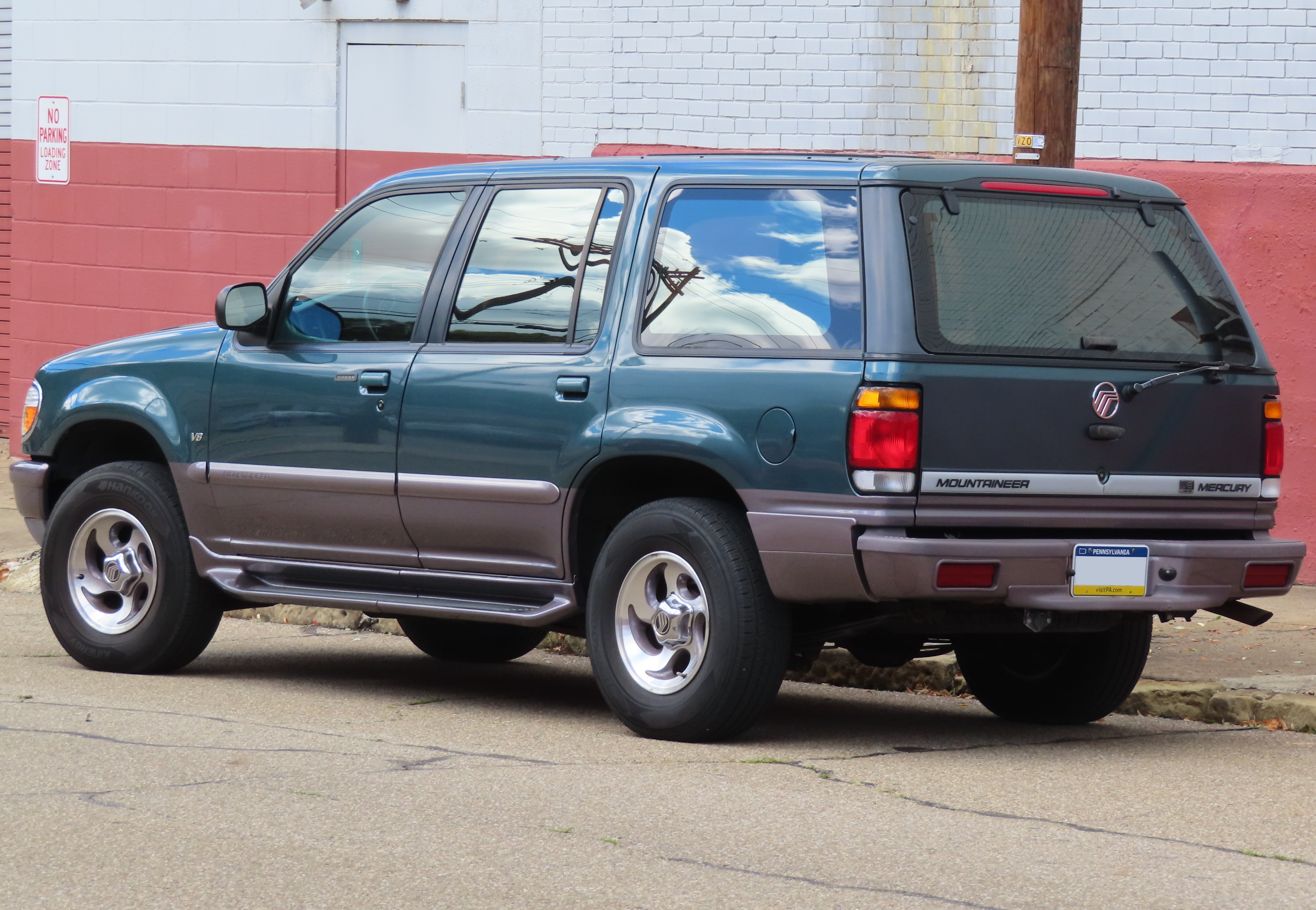

The first-generation Mercury Mountaineer entering production in April 1996 as an early 1997 model line. Slotted between the Ford Explorer Eddie Bauer and the Explorer Limited, the Mountaineer was offered solely as a five-door wagon.

While falling short of Lincoln-Mercury sales projections, the Mountaineer would outsell its Oldsmobile Bravada competitor by a wide margin. The model line became the third-best selling Mercury vehicle, trailing only the Sable and the Grand Marquis.

=== Body ===
At its launch, the Mercury Mountaineer differed from the Explorer Limited in its two-tone body design, adopting an appearance closer to the Explorer XLT than the Explorer Eddie Bauer. The Mountaineer was styled with a distinct dark-gray lower body color scheme (with painted bumpers). The model line was styled with a waterfall-style grille (not recessed, in contrast with the Explorer). The rear liftgate and bumper (with rear foglamps) were sourced from the European-export version of the Explorer.

For 1998, the Mountaineer adopted the same mid-cycle revisions as the Explorer, including body-color D-pillars and the relocation of the license plate to the liftgate (the Mountaineer dropped the export rear bumper and its foglamps). Along with the addition of a new front bumper, the grille opening was inverted with new headlamps (a change not shared with the Explorer).

=== Chassis ===
The 1997–2001 Mercury Mountaineer shares the chassis of the second-generation Ford Explorer, sharing a 111-inch wheelbase. Though heavily based upon the first-generation Ford Ranger, the five-door sport-utility vehicles are wider and have a distinct wheelbase. As with the Ford Explorer, the Mountaineer is fitted with fully independent wishbone front suspension and a leaf-sprung live rear axle.

For 1997, the Mercury Mountaineer was fitted with a 215 hp (160 kW) 5.0-liter V8 with a 4-speed automatic transmission. For 1998, the 205 hp (153 kW) 4.0-liter SOHC V6 was offered as an option. Like the Ford Explorer, the V8 engine was mated to either rear-wheel drive or full time all-wheel drive (viscous coupling center differential); part-time four-wheel drive was unavailable with the V8 engine. The V6 Mountaineer was offered either as rear-wheel drive or ControlTrac four-wheel drive with "Auto", "High" and "Low" modes.

=== Trim ===
The first-generation Mercury Mountaineer was introduced in a single trim level, combining many available features of the Ford Explorer Eddie Bauer and Limited. With the exception of a sunroof, CD changer, and the selection of front seat design, there were few freestanding options.

For 1998, the addition of the V6 version differed primarily in its powertrain configuration, with Mercury choosing to continue to offer the Mountaineer as a single comprehensive trim level.

== Second generation (2002–2005) ==
Second generation
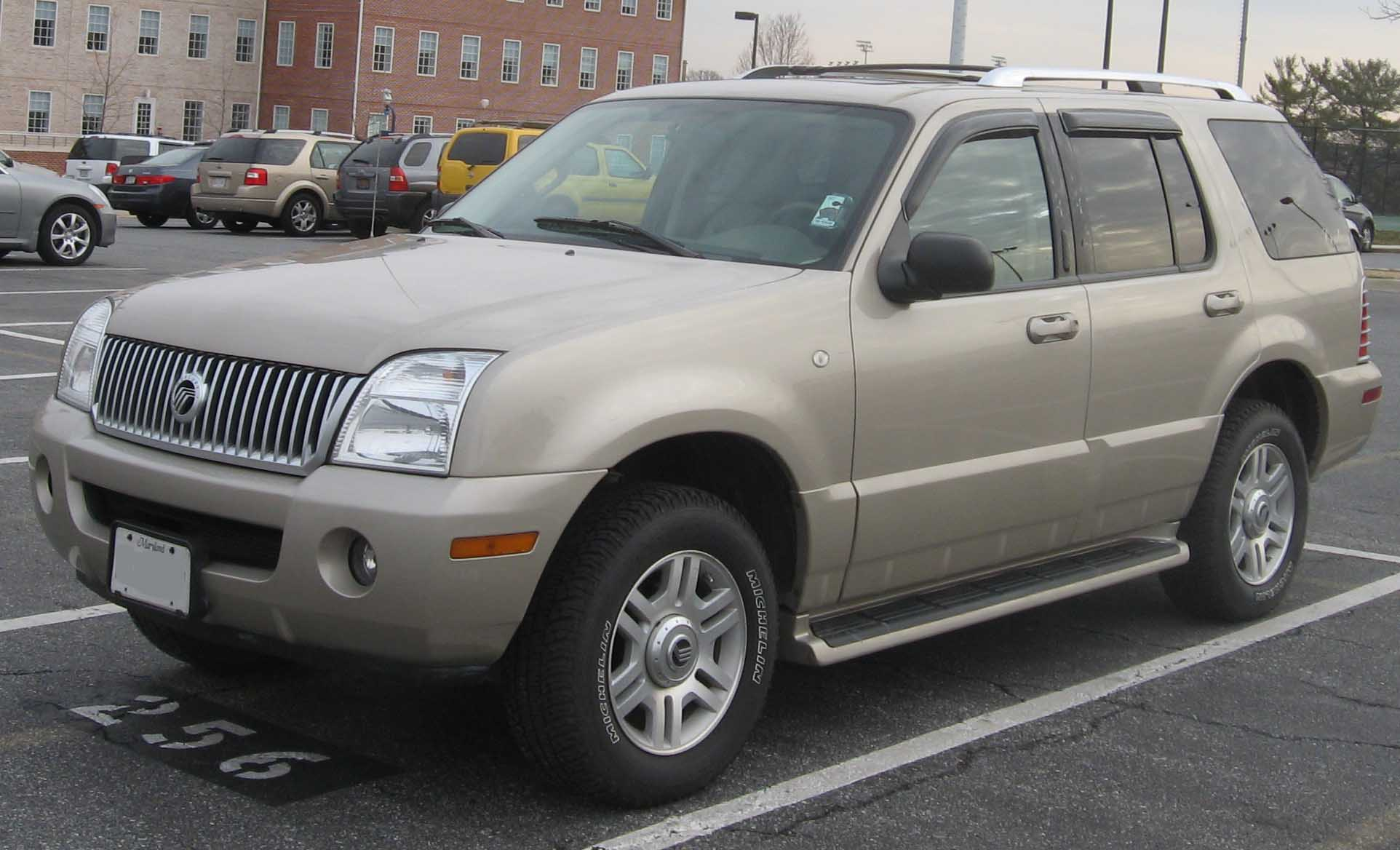

Overview
- Production: November 2000–2005
- Model years: 2002–2005

Body and chassis
- Related: Ford Explorer; Lincoln Aviator

Powertrain
- Engine: 4.0 L Cologne V6; 4.6 L Modular V8
- Transmission: 5-speed automatic

Dimensions
- Wheelbase: 2002–2003: 113.7 in (2,888 mm); 2004–2005: 113.8 in (2,891 mm)
- Length: 2002–2003: 190.7 in (4,844 mm); 2004–2005: 190.9 in (4,849 mm)
- Width: 2002–2003: 72.1 in (1,831 mm); 2004–2005: 72.3 in (1,836 mm)
- Height: 2002–2003 2WD: 69.6 in (1,768 mm); 2002–2003 AWD: 71.5 in (1,816 mm); 2004–2005: 72.5 in (1,842 mm)

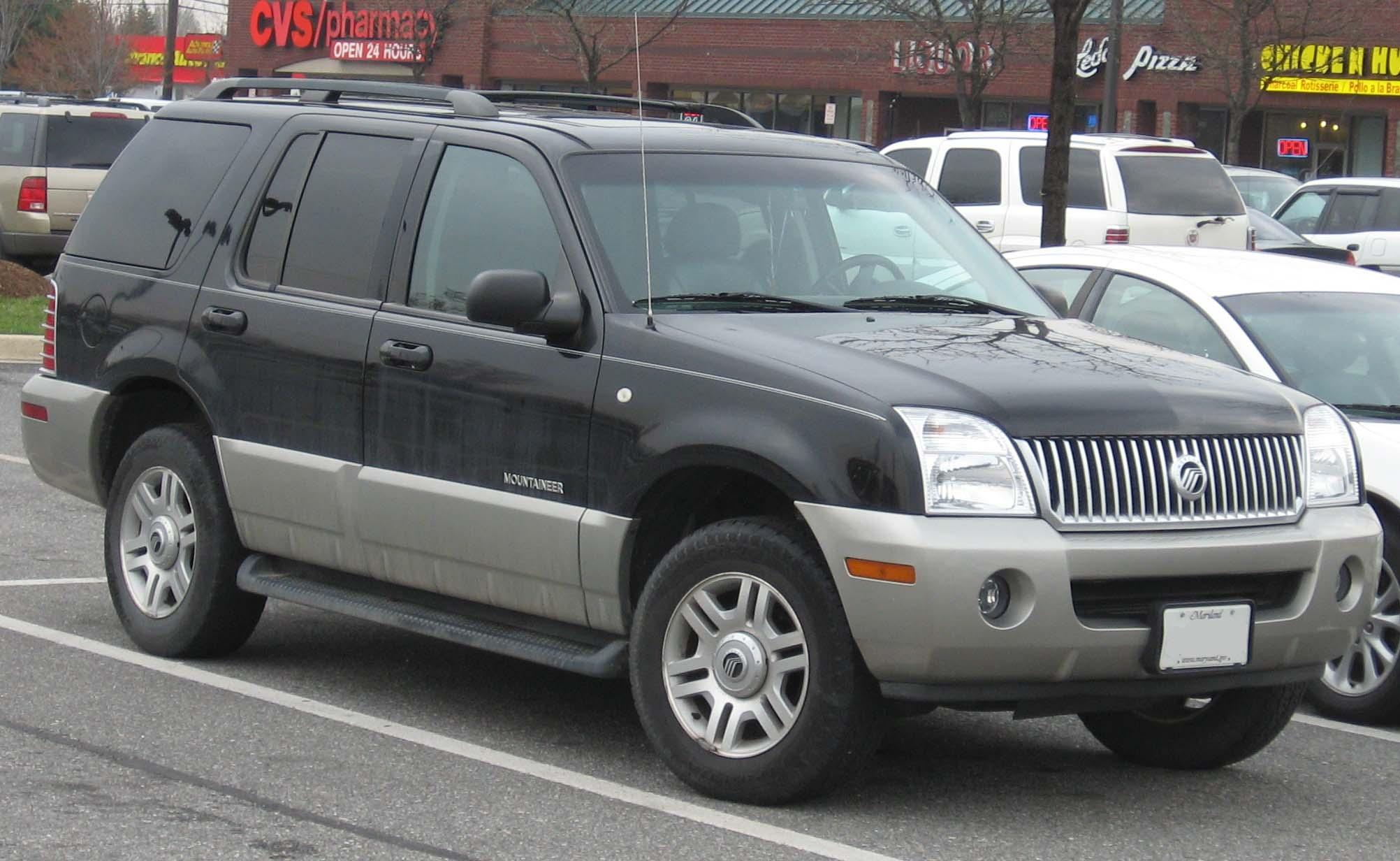
2002–2003 Mercury Mountaineer

The second-generation Mercury Mountaineer was introduced for the 2002 model year, redesigned alongside the five-door Ford Explorer. Ending its chassis commonality with the Ford Ranger pickup truck, the Explorer/Mountaineer adopted a dedicated platform, introducing four-wheel independent suspension to the model lines. Though sharing much of the same body (from the firewall rearward), designers began to give the model line an identity distinct from the Explorer. While sharing the same roofline and doors, the Mountaineer received different front fenders, hood, front and rear bumpers, liftgate, headlamps and taillamps.

Previewed by a concept vehicle at the 2000 Los Angeles Auto Show, the 2002 Mercury Mountaineer marked the introduction of a new design language for the Mercury line. The traditional Mercury silver waterfall grille was made rectangular (along with headlamps wrapping into the hood), introducing silver-trimmed taillamps and satin-silver wheels and badging. In various forms, style elements of the 2002 Mountaineer would appear across the Mercury line during the 2000s, including the Grand Marquis, Montego, Milan, Monterey, and Mariner.

The second-generation Mountaineer carried over the 210 hp (157 kW) 4.0 L SOHC V6 as standard fitment; a 239 hp (178 kW) 4.6 L V8 (shared with the Grand Marquis) replaced the previous 5.0 L V8. A 5-speed automatic transmission was paired with both engines, with either part-time four-wheel drive or full-time all-wheel drive offered.

In contrast to the single trim level of the first generation, the second generation was expanded to a base Convenience trim (slotted between the Explorer XLT/Eddie Bauer) and a deluxe Premier trim (slotted above the Explorer Limited) to align with trims offered on other Mercury models. The Mountaineer Premier offered features including a rear TV/DVD player, rear ceiling air vents, chrome exhaust tip and roof rack, and body-color bumpers.

== Third generation (2006–2010) ==
Third generation (U251)
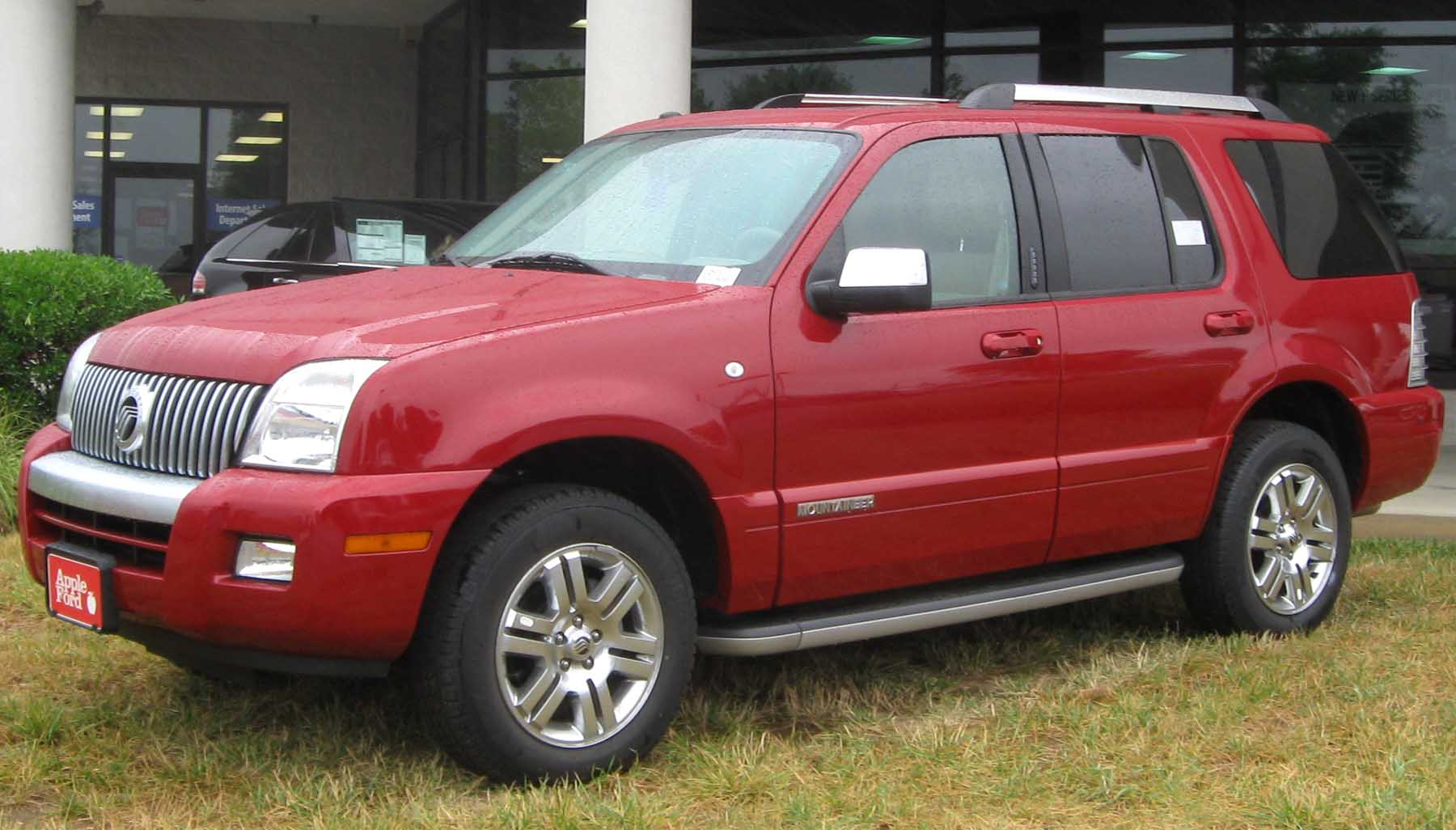

Overview
- Production: July 2005–October 1, 2010
- Model years: 2006–2010

Body and chassis
- Platform: Ford U2 platform
- Related: Ford Explorer; Ford Explorer Sport Trac; Lincoln Aviator

Powertrain
- Engine: 4.0 L Cologne V6; 4.6 L Modular V-8
- Transmission: 5-speed 5R55S automatic 6-speed 6R automatic

Dimensions
- Wheelbase: 113.7 in (2,888 mm)
- Length: 2006–2007: 193.4 in (4,912 mm); 2008–2010: 193.5 in (4,915 mm)
- Width: 2006–2007: 73.5 in (1,867 mm); 2008–2010: 73.7 in (1,872 mm)
- Height: 72.8 in (1,849 mm)

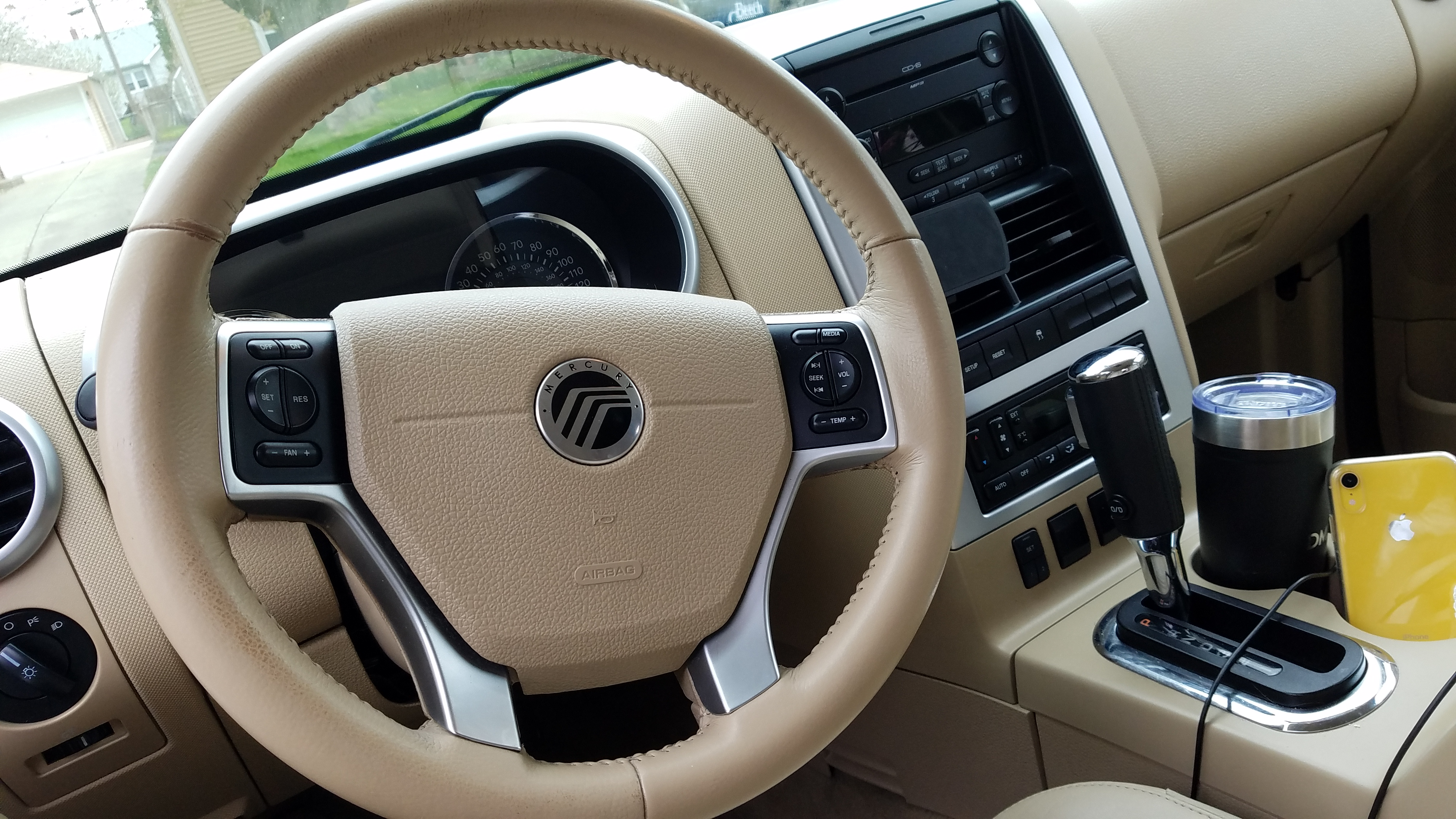
2006–2010 Mercury Mountaineer dashboard

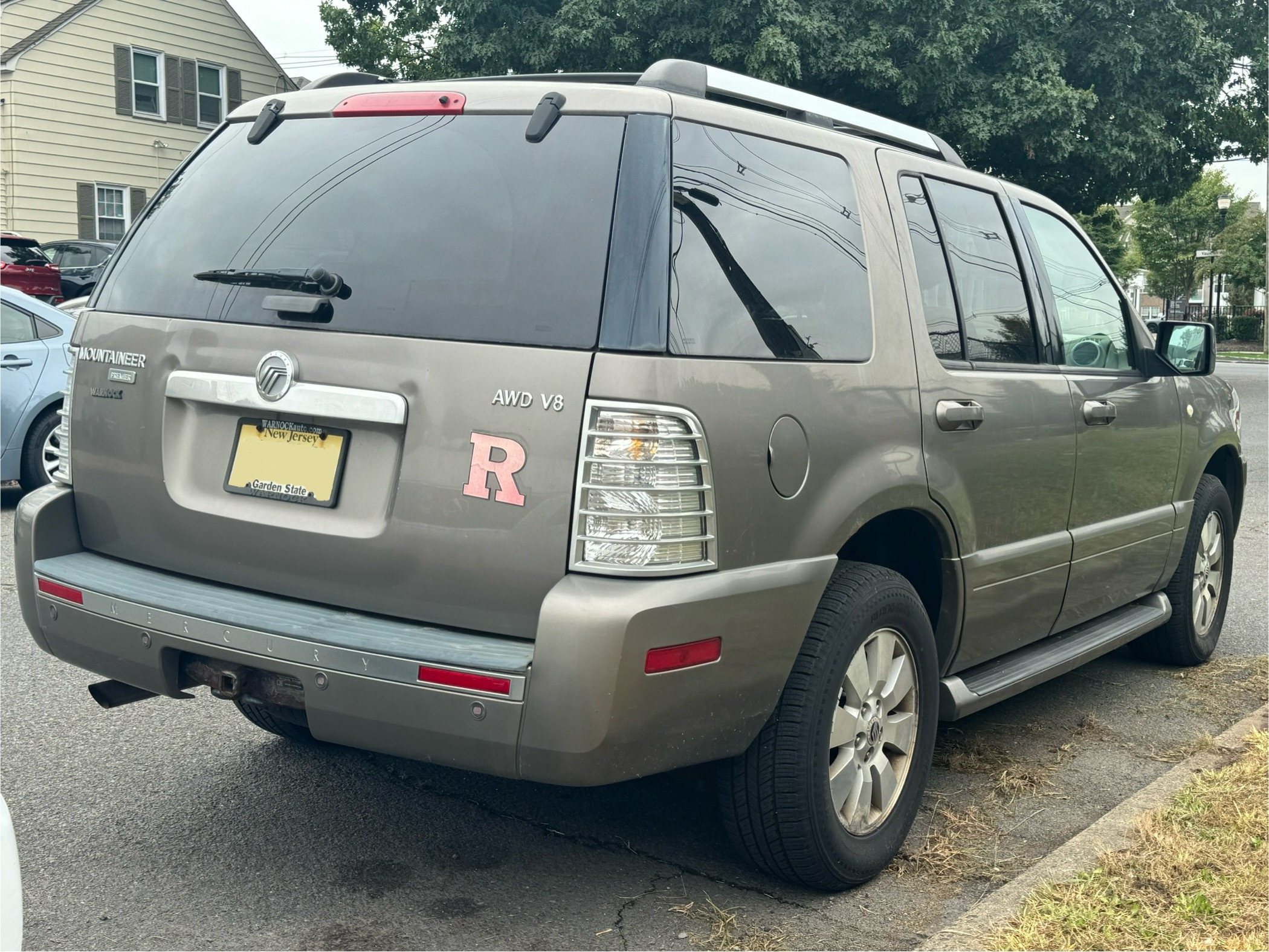
'06 Mountaineer Premier V8 AWD rear

The third-generation Mercury Mountaineer was introduced for the 2006 model year, again serving as a counterpart of the Ford Explorer. Though unchanged in wheelbase, the model line rode on an all-new chassis, gaining nearly three inches in length. In contrast to the Explorer, the third-generation Mountaineer retained many styling elements from the previous generation, introducing clear-lens LED taillamps, fender-mounted turn signal repeaters, larger standard wheels, optional satin-silver trim for the sideview mirrors and bumpers, and the grille and tailgate received larger Mercury emblems.

Following the discontinuation of the Lincoln Aviator, the Mountaineer again served as the premium mid-size SUV offering of the Lincoln-Mercury division. To better differentiate the model line from the Explorer Eddie Bauer and Limited, Lincoln-Mercury upgraded the interior trim of the Mountaineer and carried over various features from the discontinued Aviator, including the option of a DVD-based navigation system with voice control (not offered on any Explorer until 2008). As an option, the Mountaineer Premier offered power-retracting running boards (a feature adopted from the larger Lincoln Navigator, not introduced on the Explorer until 2007).

The Mountaineer carried over the 210 hp (157 kW) 4.0 L SOHC V6 as the standard engine, introducing a 292 hp (218 kW) 4.6-liter Modular 24-valve V8 as an option (replacing the previous 16-valve version). V6 engines were paired with a 5-speed 5R55W automatic transmission; V8 engines received an all-new 6R 6-speed automatic.

During its production, the third-generation Mountaineer saw relatively few functional changes. For 2007, "MOUNTAINEER" badging was returned to the doors (after a four-year absence). For 2008, side-curtain airbags were made standard. For 2009, trailer-sway control was made standard on examples equipped for towing. The navigation system was upgraded, including traffic flow monitoring and live updates on fuel prices from nearby service stations. For 2010, all trim levels received the Ford MyKey system as a standard feature; the system is a programmable security system designed for vehicles owned by multiple drivers.

== Discontinuation ==
For 2000, the Mountaineer was the third-best-selling Mercury (behind the Sable and Grand Marquis); ten years later, the model line had become the slowest-selling vehicle of the brand. Following the June 2010 announcement by Ford Motor Company to shelve the Mercury brand, the final Mountaineer was produced on October 1, 2010 at the Louisville, KY assembly plant.

Unlike the Milan, Mariner, and Grand Marquis, the Mountaineer was not produced for a short 2011 model year. While the Ford Fusion and Ford Escape has seen only detail changes for 2011 (the Ford Crown Victoria had already ended retail sales in North America), the Ford Explorer underwent a major redesign for 2011; along with several major changes to the model line, the Explorer no longer shared a body with any divisional counterparts.

== Firestone tire controversy ==
In May 2000, the National Highway Traffic Safety Administration (NHTSA) contacted Ford and Firestone about the high incidence of tire failure on first generation Mountaineers, first and second generation Ford Explorers, and Mazda Navajo 3-doors fitted with Firestone tires. Ford investigated and found that several models of 15-inch (381 mm) Firestone tires (ATX, ATX II, and Wilderness AT) had very high failure rates, especially those made at Firestone's Decatur, Illinois plant.

== Awards ==
- Class Exclusive Roll Stability Control (RSC) System.
- Consumers Digest Best Buy for 2006 and 2007.

== Sales ==
| Calendar Year | American sales |
|---|---|
| 1996 | 26,700 |
| 1997 | 45,363 |
| 1998 | 47,595 |
| 1999 | 49,281 |
| 2000 | 46,547 |
| 2001 | 45,574 |
| 2002 | 48,144 |
| 2003 | 49,692 |
| 2004 | 43,916 |
| 2005 | 32,491 |
| 2006 | 29,567 |
| 2007 | 23,850 |
| 2008 | 10,596 |
| 2009 | 5,169 |
| 2010 | 5,791 |
