= Airman Magazine =

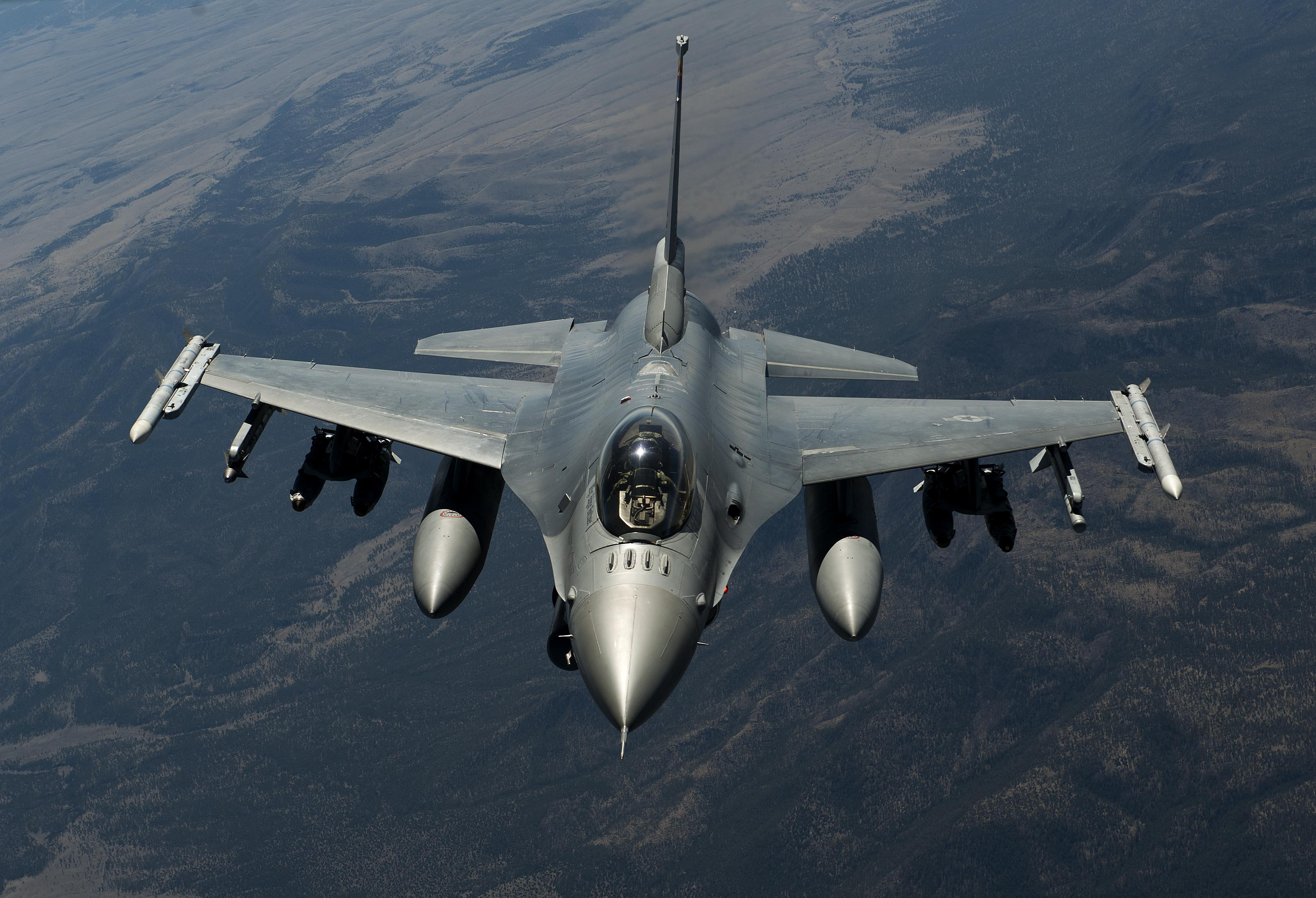
- Photograph of a General Dynamics F-16 Fighting Falcon from a 2015 issue of Airman Magazine online
- Categories: Aircraft
- Frequency: Bi-monthly
- Founded: 1957
- Country: USA
- Based in: Fort Meade, Maryland
- Language: English
- Website: airman.dodlive.mil

Airman Magazine is the official magazine of the United States Air Force and reports on information and news about and of interest to Air Force members and their families. It is published bi-monthly online by the Defense Media Activity group. Airman also used to publish The Book annually—a summary of basic Air Force facts, weapons and aircraft—but discontinued its publication after 2011.

== History and profile ==
Airman was first published in August 1957 as The Airman. The final printed edition was released on September 1, 2011, with its new digital format for September/October 2011 being simultaneously published. The direct predecessor to Airman was called the Air Service Weekly Newsletter, first published on September 21, 1918. Before its cancellation in 1946, its name was changed to Air Corps Weekly Newsletter, Air Force Weekly Newsletter, and finally Air Forces Weekly Newsletter.
