= Fossett =

Fossett is a surname. Notable people with the surname include:

- Edith Hern Fossett (1787–1854), enslaved chef to Thomas Jefferson
- Robert George John Francis Fossett (1922–2004), English clown
- Steve Fossett (1944–2007), American businessman, aviator, sailor, and adventurer

== See also ==
- 24654 Fossett, Mars-crossing asteroid
