= Mick Rogers (musician) =

English rock guitarist, singer and songwriter (born 1946)

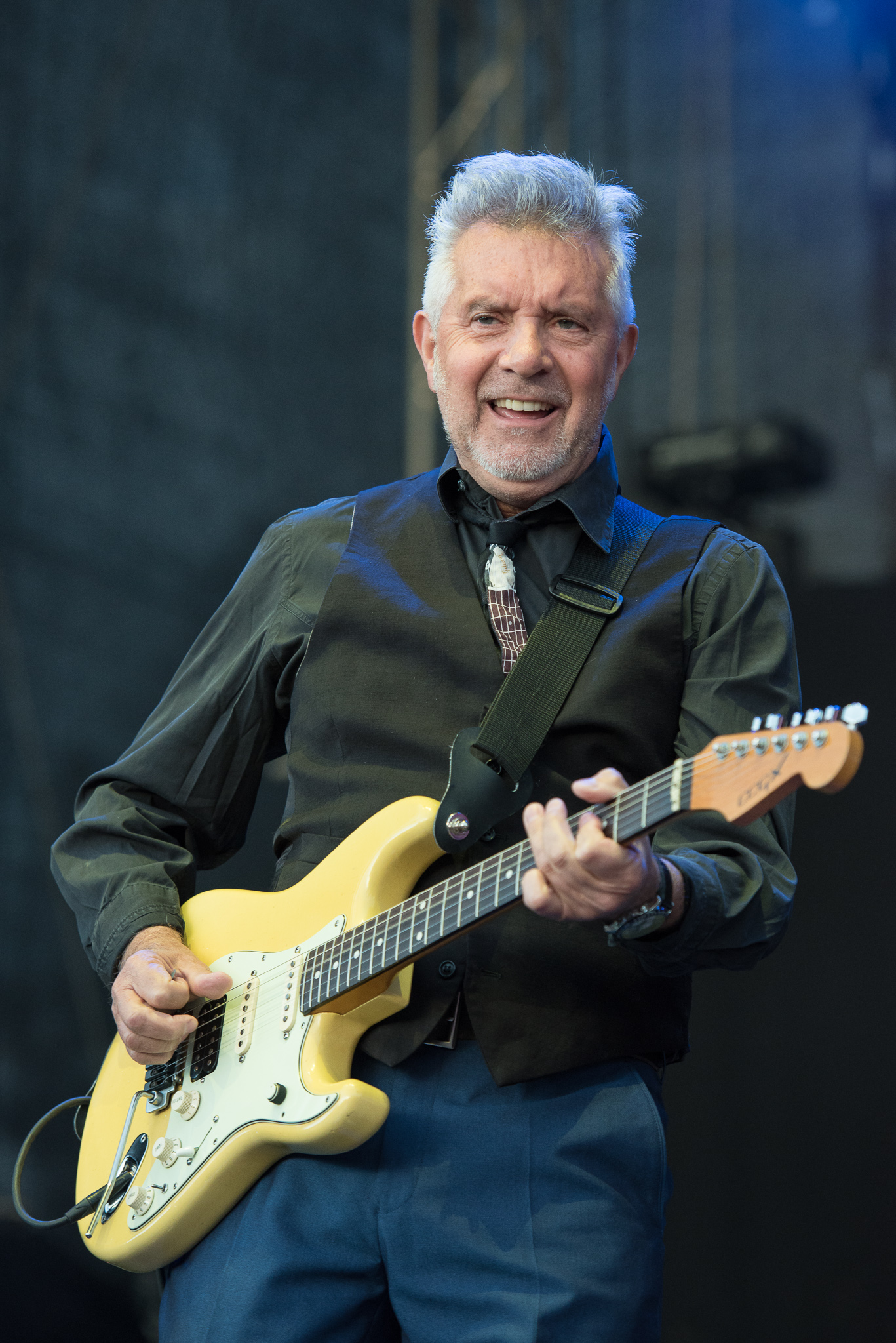
- Rogers performing with Manfred Mann's Earth Band in 2016.

Background information
- Born: Michael Oldroyd; 20 September 1946 (age 80); Dovercourt, Essex, England
- Occupation: Musician
- Instruments: Guitar; vocals
- Website: https://mickrogersmusic.com/

Mick Rogers (born Michael Oldroyd; 20 September 1946) is an English rock guitarist, singer and songwriter, chiefly known for his time with Manfred Mann's Earth Band from 1971 to 1975 and again since 1984. Rogers was the original lead vocalist of the band until his departure; after his return, he became a backing and occasional lead vocalist.

Along with the group's titular leader, Rogers is the longest serving member of Manfred Mann's Earth Band, though Mann has been the only constant member.

== Early life and career ==
His father was a drummer and his uncle a string bass player. The young Rogers was weaned on his uncle's jazz collection and 1950s rock and roll. Before MMEB he was a member of The Vision, which backed Adam Faith, and the Australian bands The Playboys, Bulldog, and Procession.

== Manfred Mann's Earth Band ==
In 1971, Rogers co-formed Manfred Mann's Earth Band, along with keyboardist Manfred Mann, who had been a member of the 1960s band named after him.

He left the Earth Band because he wanted to steer the band more in the direction of Frank Zappa, which created friction with Mann.

I had an offer to [play with] Zappa and got to know him fairly well and played with him. I became too much for the band and, I think, I had to go. It was like I was being destructive in as much that I wanted to play other things, you know? It was probably a midlife muso crisis. I worked through that. Earlier in my career I had lived in Australia and I went back through there, hooked up with some friends of mine, who are fusion players. We used to do some crazy stuff, like Ornette Coleman stuff. One moment we would be playing Ornette Coleman and the next I would be doing something from the 1950s. I'd be doing a couple of Elvis things. Even with the Earth Band, now, I do 'Shake, Rattle and Roll' on my own. I went to Los Angeles for a while, too, and got the muso stuff out of my system and rejoined the Earth Band in 1986 and I've been there since.

— Mick Rogers, Prog Rock FAQ: All That's Left to Know About Rock's Most Progressive Music

A year after Rogers left the Earth Band, in 1976, the Earth Band had a worldwide hit song with a cover of the 1973 Bruce Springsteen song, "Blinded by the Light". The song went to number one in the Americas. After his initial departure from MMEB in 1975, he returned to Australia to work and then returned to the UK, where he formed the band Aviator with drummer Clive Bunker. They released two albums.

During the initial years with Manfred Mann's Earth Band, Rogers was the only guitarist and chief lead vocalist in the group. When he returned in 1984, he shared vocal and guitar duties with Chris Thompson until Thompson's exit. The band effectively stopped existing after the release of Masque (1987), but a new formation was made in the early 1990s. Chris Thompson's parts and several new songs were now sung by Noel McCalla, whereas Rogers mostly only sang lead on "Father of Day, Father of Night", "Joybringer" and some verses on "Spirits in the Night" and "Mighty Quinn". This pattern did not change through further line-ups; Rogers is once again the band's main guitarist (current vocalist Robert Hart intermittently plays guitar) but never sings more than a handful of vocal parts, which in recent times have typically included a stripped-down version of "Do Wah Diddy Diddy".

In 2020, Rogers planned to play material of the early Earth Band with original member Colin Pattenden and keyboardist Mike Keneally at the Burg Herzberg Festival under the moniker Solar Fire, however this did not happen due to the COVID-19 pandemic. The appearance was rescheduled twice and planned for 2022. With the exception of Manfred Mann himself, Rogers is the only original member that is still active in the band.

== Later projects ==
During his second tenure with the Earth Band, Rogers released a handful of solo albums. His solo debut Back to Earth got a mixed review on the German Babyblaue Prog-Reviews, which praised Rogers' vocal and guitar work but criticized the fact that he was not accompanied by other musicians and instead relied on programmed drums. Father of Day was described on the same site as a maxi single, which shared its parent album's qualities and shortcomings.

Sharabang, recorded in the Austrian Alps, featured Matt and Gregg Bissonette and was mixed by Chuck Ainlay. The album got a positive review from RockTimes, praising authentic and solid work and giving a lot of attention to Rogers' own compositions such as "Cutting Me to Pieces". A similarly positive review was published by Musik an sich, giving the album 15 out of 20 stars. Reviewer Jürgen Weber lauded Rogers' rendition of "I Heard It Through the Grapevine" and also pointed out "Cutting Me to Pieces" as a highlight, but noted that the album could have done with more original songs and more uptempo material. Musicreviews.de was more reserved in its review, again praising the Rammstein-esque "Cutting Me to Pieces" as well as Rogers's vocals, but criticizing some soft songs in the second half and the too obvious choice of covers. According to Rogers himself, he would have preferred to cover obscure songs from the 1950s and tracks by Ornette Coleman, but his label preferred more accessible song choices such as "The Joker". He also later denounced his non-album Christmas release from 2012, a cover of the John Lennon / Yoko Ono song, "Happy Xmas (War Is Over)", saying he was sponsored to do it, but would not do it again because it was not his style.

In 2026, Rogers released the album The Guitarist, which is largely a solo project like Back to Earth and includes two three-song suites, one of which ("The Gasoline Suite" comprising "Start Your Engines", "Changing Gears" and "Pump It Up") was written for the 2026 Fox Sports IndyCar racing production. One notable contribution includes his son George Sherrard, who wrote the track "The Privateers" and plays keyboards on it. The rest of the record contains self-penned material as well as covers of "Sitting On Top of the World", "The Boys" by The Shadows, "Big Legs, Tight Skirt" by John Lee Hooker, "House of the Rising Sun" and "I Am A Man Of Constant Sorrow". Get Ready To Rock! called the album "diverse and unexpected, by turns satisfying and sometimes rewardingly challenging", but also lacking coherence and criticized its length, giving the album three and a half stars.

== Personal life ==
Mick Rogers lives in Surrey and has four children. In a 2019 interview, he explained his opposition to Brexit ("Make that a headline: Mick Rogers does not want out of the EU").

== Discography ==
- Back to Earth (2002)
- Father of Day (2003)
- Sharabang (2013)
- The Guitarist (2026)
