= Aviator (British band) =

British progressive rock band

- Members of the English band Aviator

Background information
- Origin: United Kingdom (1978)
- Genres: Progressive rock, pop
- Years active: 1979-1980
- Members: Jack Lancaster; Mick Rogers; Clive Bunker; John G. Perry

Aviator is an English rock band formed in 1978.

Aviator was founded in 1978 by Jack Lancaster (saxophone, flute, synthesizer), Mick Rogers (guitar & lead vocals), Clive Bunker (drums) and John G. Perry (bass & vocals). The brand released their debut album Aviator (1979) which contained nine tracks. They went on tour in Europe as a supporting act for Steve Hillage before performing on various festivals and venues throughout Germany. Jack Lancaster left the band after the tour of 1979.

The three members that remained recorded the band's second and final album - Turbulence (1980).

The band reunited with all four members present for Lancaster's solo album Skinningrove Bay in 1980.

== Discography ==
- Aviator (1979)
- Turbulence (1980)

== Line-up ==
- Jack Lancaster - saxophones, flute, lyricon, synthesizer, computone
- Mick Rogers - lead vocals, guitar
- Clive Bunker - drums, percussion
- John G. Perry - bass, Taurus pedals, vocals
