= Lincoln Aviator =

Mid-size luxury SUV

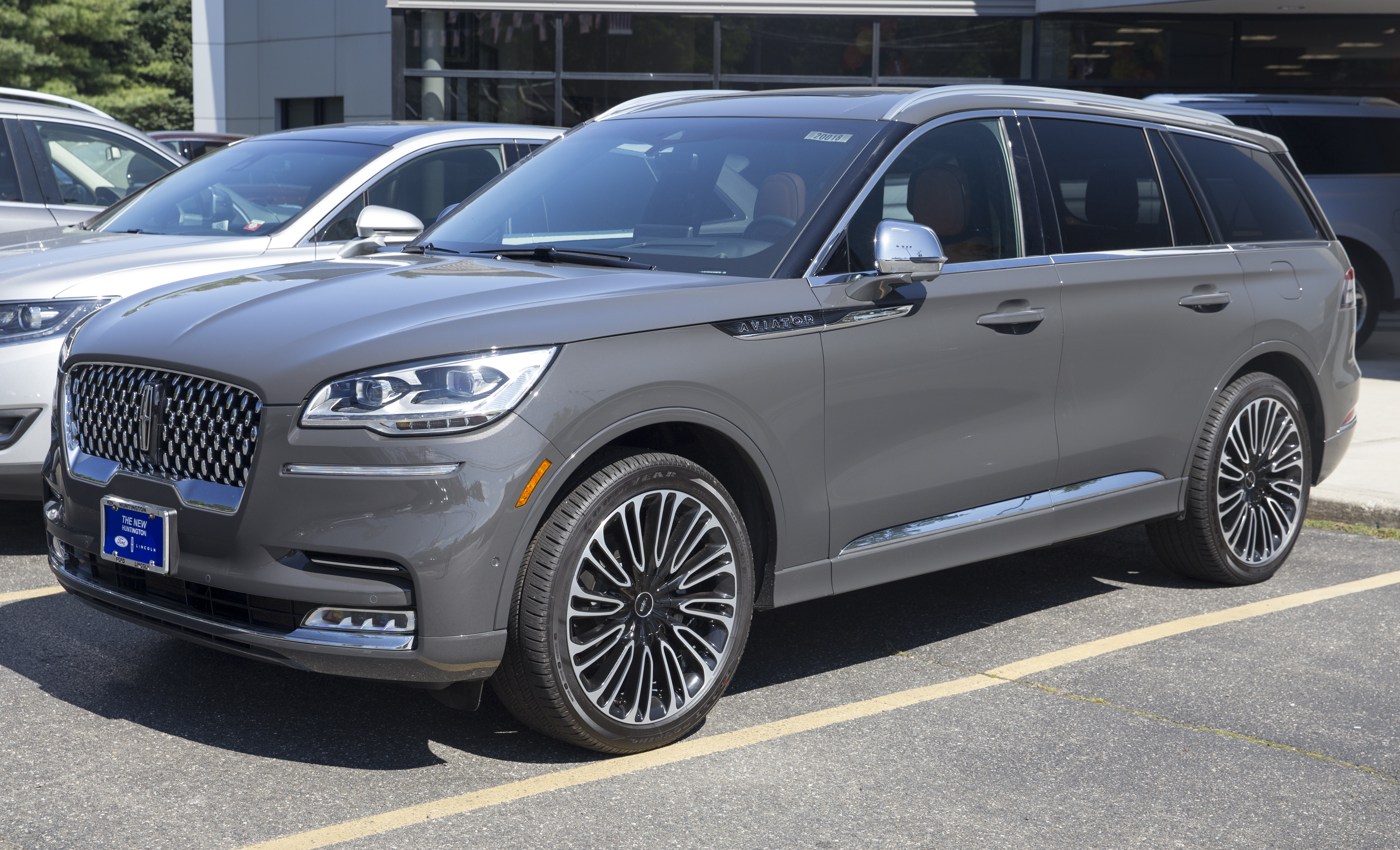
- 2020 Lincoln Aviator

Overview
- Manufacturer: Lincoln (Ford)
- Production: 2002–2005; 2019–present
- Model years: 2003–2005; 2020–present

Body and chassis
- Class: Mid-size luxury SUV (2002–2005); Mid-size luxury crossover SUV (2019–present)
- Body style: 5-door SUV
- Layout: Front-engine, rear-wheel-drive; Front-engine, four-wheel-drive

The Lincoln Aviator is a mid-size, three-row luxury SUV manufactured and marketed under the Lincoln brand of Ford Motor Company — and now in its second generation, with a hiatus from 2006 to 2020.

The first generation Aviator was manufactured for 2003–2005 model years as a rebadged variant of the third generation Ford Explorer — and assembled at the now-closed St. Louis Assembly in Hazelwood, Missouri, alongside the Explorer and Mountaineer.

For the 2020 model year, Lincoln reintroduced the Aviator as a badge engineered variant of the sixth generation Ford Explorer manufactured at Chicago Assembly and offered with a plug-in hybrid variant.

== First generation (UN152; 2003) ==
First generation
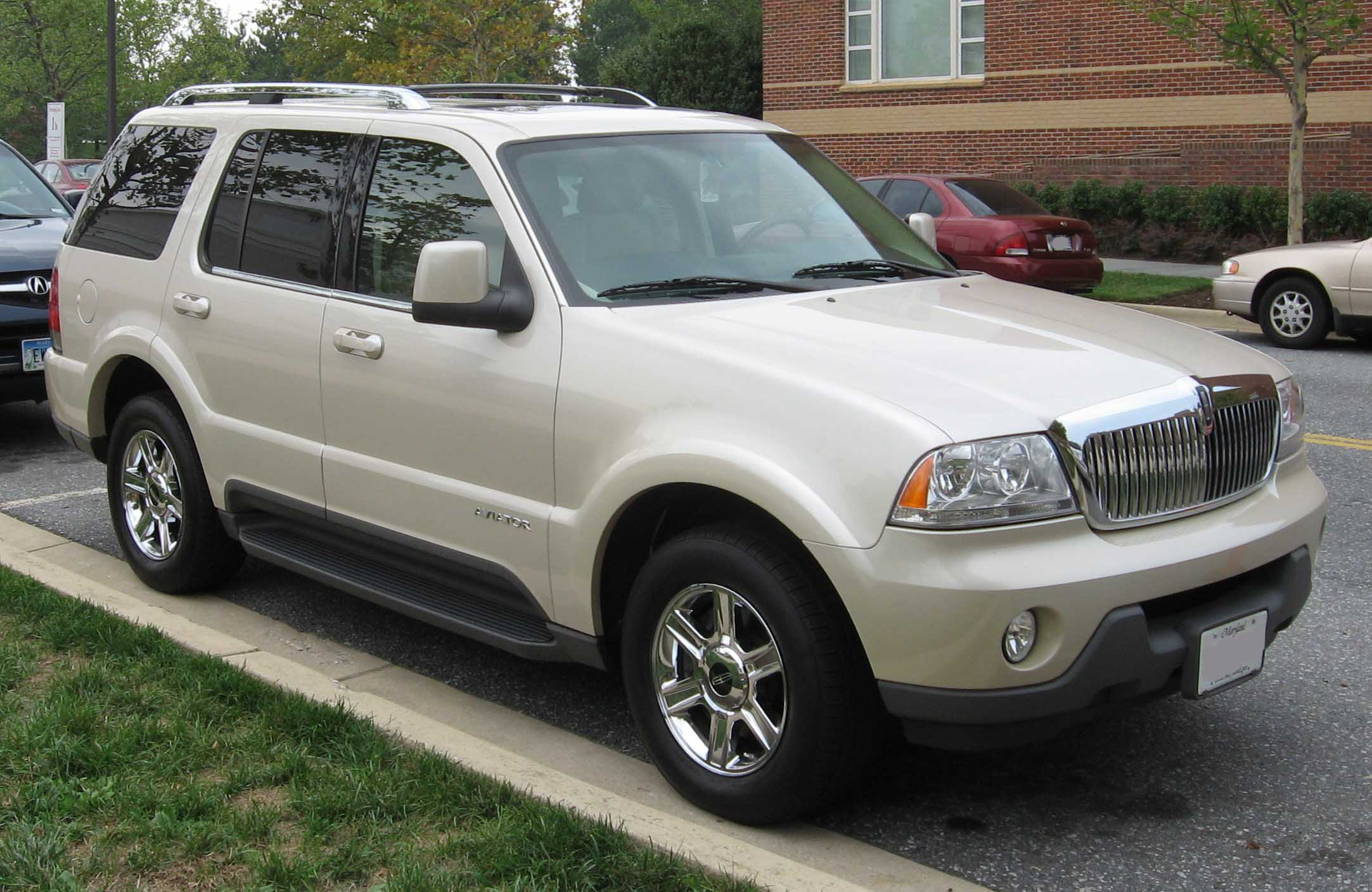

Overview
- Model code: UN152
- Production: 2002–2005
- Model years: 2003–2005
- Assembly: United States: Hazelwood, Missouri (St. Louis Assembly)

Body and chassis
- Chassis: Body-on-frame
- Related: Ford Explorer; Ford Explorer Sport Trac; Mercury Mountaineer

Powertrain
- Engine: 4.6 L Modular V8 (gasoline)
- Power output: 225 kW (302 hp; 306 PS)
- Transmission: 5-speed 5R55S overdrive automatic

Dimensions
- Wheelbase: 2,888 mm (113.7 in)
- Length: 4,910 mm (193.3 in)
- Width: 1,877 mm (73.9 in)
- Height: 1,826 mm (71.9 in)

Chronology
- Successor: Lincoln MKX (2006–2018); Lincoln MKT (2010–2019); Mercury Mountaineer

The Aviator was launched for the 2003 model year with three-row six-passenger seating configuration and optional second row bucket seats with center console or second-row bench seating (at no cost).

Along with the choice of four-wheel drive (4WD) configuration and towing packages, the Aviator was offered with optional heated/cooled front bucket seats, xenon (HID) headlights, 17-inch chrome wheels, and a DVD-based navigation system. These options were late availability in 2003 on the premium model and 2004 (Ultimate), 2005 (Elite). The Aviator was equipped with dual front/side airbags, side-curtain airbags, stability and traction control.

=== Chassis ===
Sharing its chassis with the third-generation Explorer, the Aviator is derived from the body-on-frame Ford U1 platform. Sharing its 2,888 mm (113.7 in) wheelbase with the Explorer/Mountaineer, the Aviator is fitted with four-wheel independent suspension.

A standard towing package was fitted to all 4WD Aviators with a heavy-duty towing package optional on either rear-wheel drive (RWD) or 4WD models.

=== Powertrain ===
In place of the SOHC two-valve version of the 4.6 L Modular V8 shared with the Explorer/Mountaineer and other Ford trucks, the Aviator was fitted with the DOHC four-valve version of the engine, shared with the Mustang Mach 1 and Marauder.

Producing 225 kW (302 hp; 306 PS) and 407 N⋅m (300 lbf⋅ft) of torque, the DOHC V8 engine in the Aviator came with two more horsepower than the 5.4-L V8 in the Navigator (though with 75 N⋅m (55 lbf⋅ft) less of torque). As with the Explorer/Mountaineer, rear-wheel drive was standard, with Lincoln offering all-wheel drive as an option; all versions were equipped with a five-speed 5R55S overdrive automatic transmission.

=== Body ===
The Aviator derived its body construction from the third-generation Explorer, sharing its body structure, doors, and roofline with both model lines. The Aviator adopts a number of styling cues from the second-generation Navigator, with visually similar front and rear stayling, lower door panels/running boards, grilles, and headlamps, and license-plate surrounds. Styled similar to later-1960s Lincolns, the rectangular-designed instrument panel featured an instrument cluster with electroluminescent gauges and needles. The Aviator received model-specific seats and leather, with American walnut wood trim on the doors and steering wheel.

=== Trim ===
At its 2002 launch, the Aviator was offered in Luxury base trim and Premium trim level. For 2004, the Premium trim was renamed Ultimate. For 2005, the Luxury trim became the sole offering, with previous content remaining available as stand-alone options, including a rear-seat DVD player. An Elite option package was offered, which bundled all features of the Premium/Ultimate trims; the package offered a DVD-based navigation system.

==== Kitty Hawk Special Edition ====
To commemorate the 100th anniversary of the Wright Brothers' 1903 flight at Kitty Hawk, North Carolina, and the 100th anniversary of Ford Motor Company, Lincoln offered a "Kitty Hawk" limited edition of the Aviator; it was the official vehicle of the 2003 EAA Countdown to Kitty Hawk. Along with special Kitty Hawk badging and trim, the limited-edition featured mink zebrano wood trim, argent painted and chrome grille, and a rear spoiler, chrome exhaust tip, chrome wheels, xenon (HID) headlamps, black premium leather heated/cooled seats with Kitty Hawk logo embossed on front seatbacks, black carpet floor mats with stitched Kitty Hawk logo, available only in black exterior color.

=== Marketing and reception ===
Lincoln played up the similarity to the Navigator full-size SUV with magazine ads that read, "Imitation is the sincerest form of flattery. Especially when it's yourself you're imitating." The Aviator was met with relatively positive press coverage.

While the Aviator's styling borrowed cues from its big brother, the Navigator, it also looked similar to the very widespread Explorer with which it shared the platform. Also working against the Aviator was that it was priced similar to the larger and relatively popular Expedition. Car and Driver said in a comparison test, in which the Aviator tied for fifth place, that only the car's high price and lack of certain features and no low range with the 4WD model held it out of contention for the top spots.

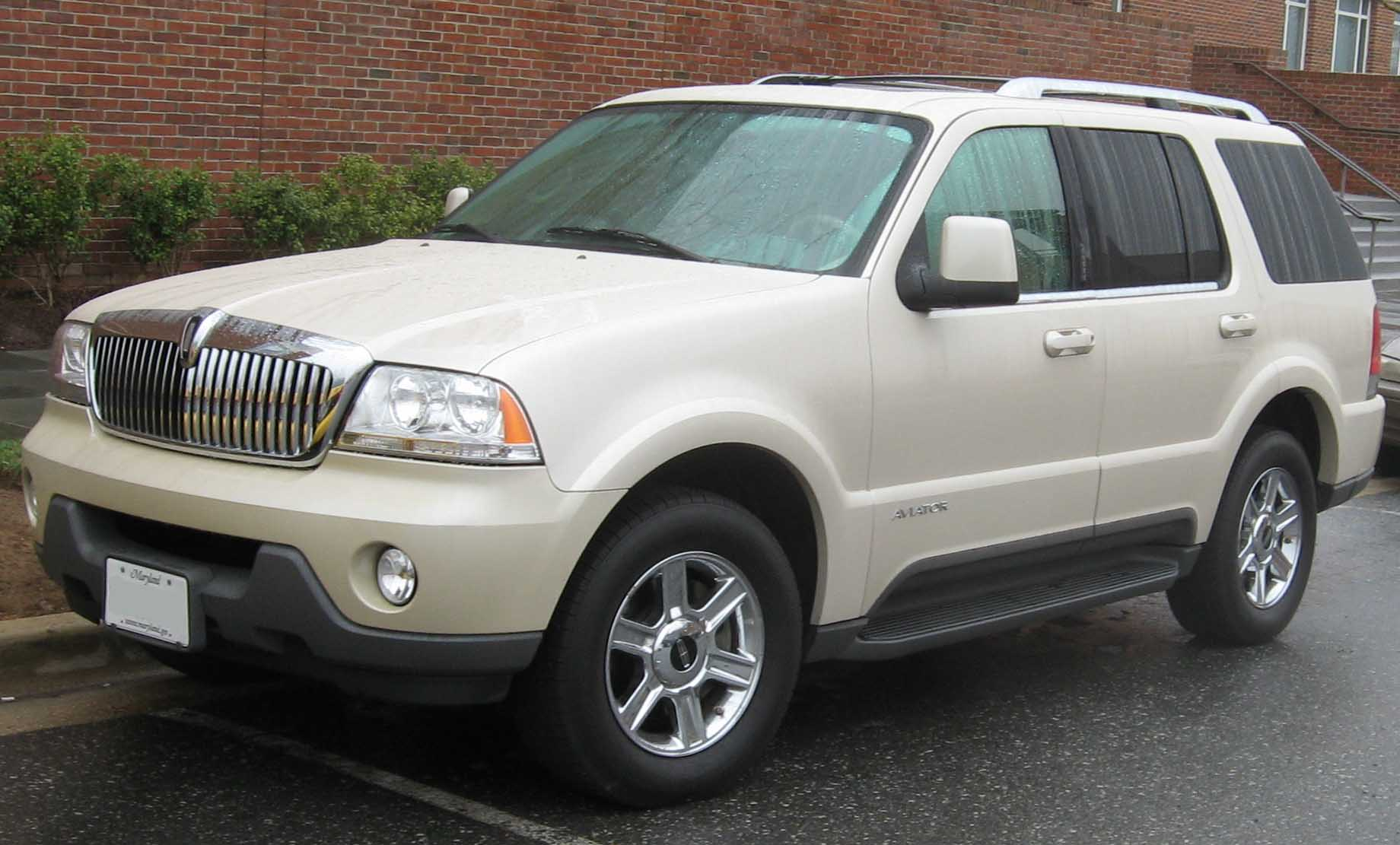
2005 Lincoln Aviator

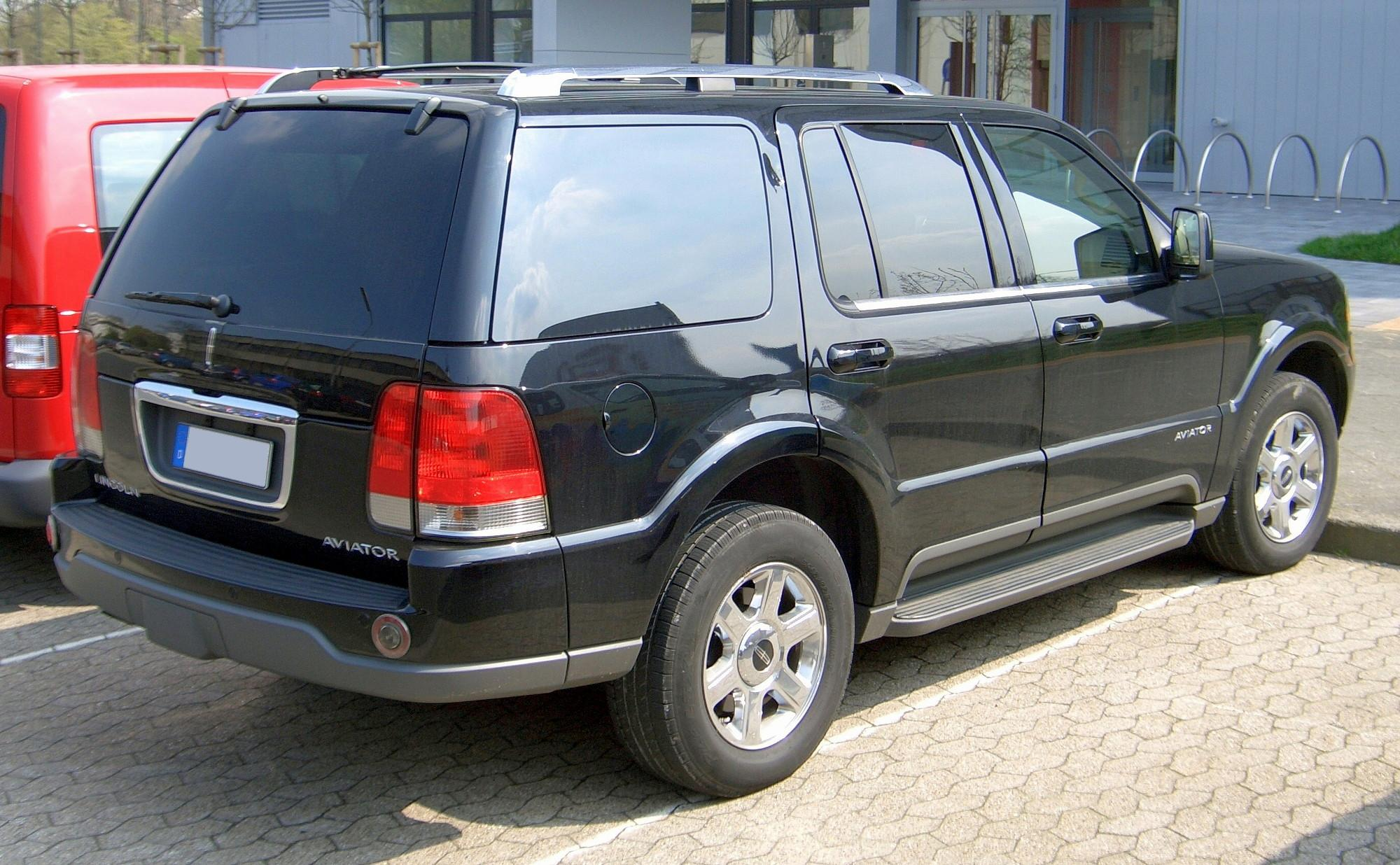
2004–2005 Lincoln Aviator, rear ¾

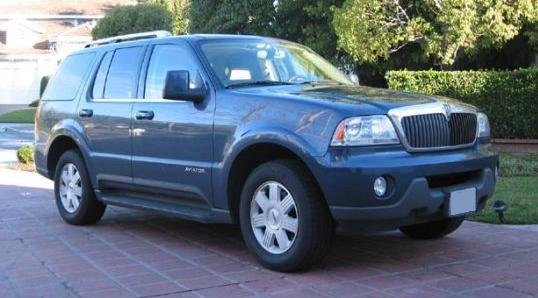
2003 Lincoln Aviator (US)

=== Replacement ===
The first-generation Lincoln Aviator was discontinued after the 2005 model year, with the final vehicle produced by St. Louis Assembly on August 19, 2005. At the 2004 Detroit Auto Show, Lincoln previewed an intended second generation. In a break from the Explorer/Mountaineer, the model line was shifting its design from a three-row SUV to a two-row crossover SUV, becoming a Lincoln counterpart of the Ford Edge CUV. The second-generation Aviator was planned to be released as an early 2007 vehicle.

In 2006, Lincoln rebranded its model line, adopting an "MK" model across its lineup, with the exception of the Navigator and the Town Car. The Aviator nameplate was dropped, becoming the Lincoln MKX (X= crossover); based on the Ford CD3 platform, the production MKX served as a counterpart of the Ford Edge.

== Second generation (U611; 2020) ==
Second generation
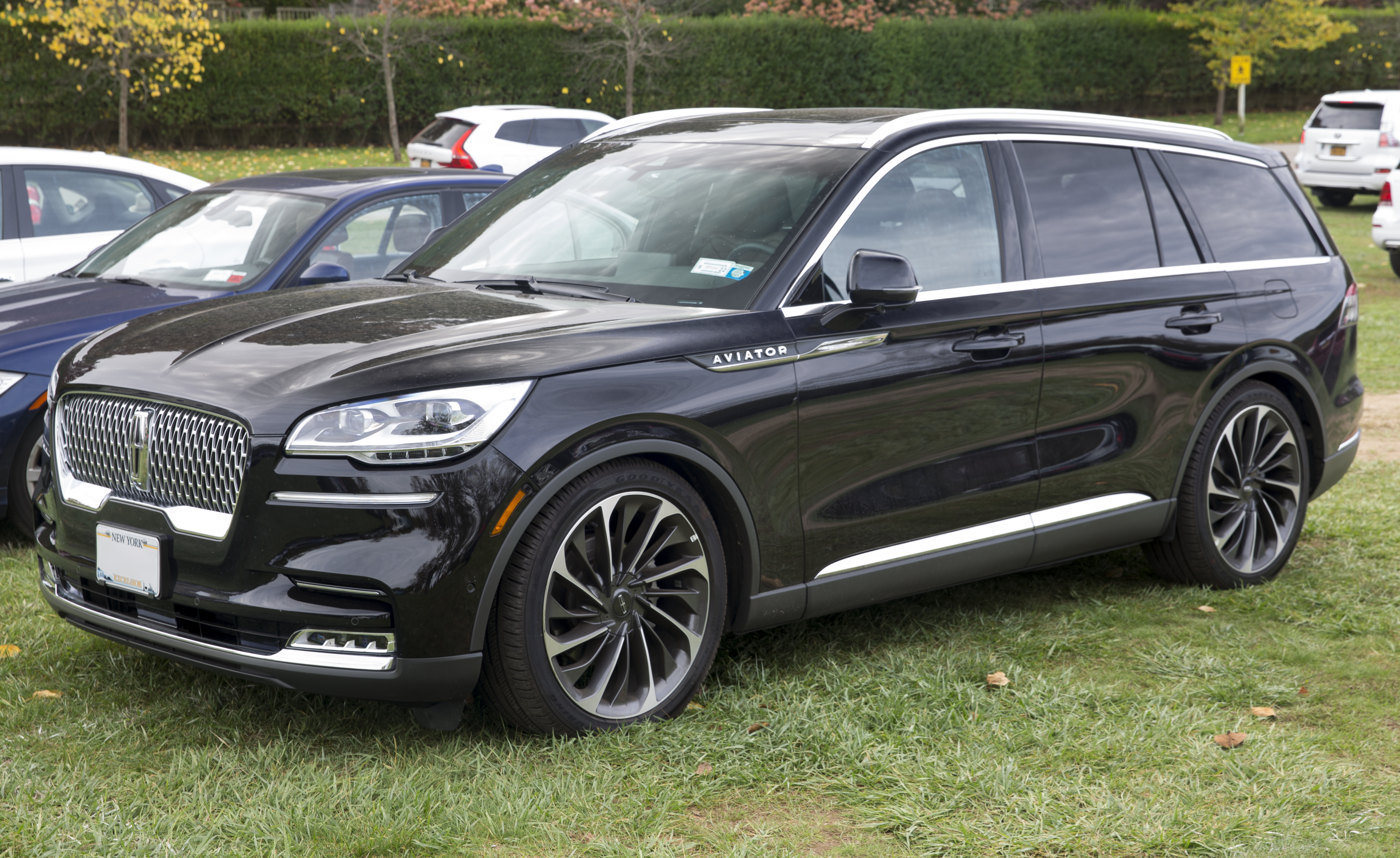

Overview
- Model code: U611
- Production: May 6, 2019–present
- Model years: 2020–present
- Assembly: United States: Chicago, Illinois (Chicago Assembly); China: Hangzhou (Changan Ford)
- Designer: Kemal Curić

Body and chassis
- Platform: Ford CD6 platform
- Chassis: Unibody
- Related: Ford Explorer

Powertrain
- Engine: Gasoline: 3.0 L twin-turbocharged EcoBoost V6; Gasoline plug-in hybrid: 3.0 L twin-turbocharged EcoBoost V6
- Electric motor: 75 kW (101 hp; 102 PS) permanent magnet synchronous
- Power output: 400–494 hp (298–368 kW; 406–501 PS)
- Transmission: 10-speed 10R80 SelectShift automatic; 10-speed modular hybrid transmission (Grand Touring)
- Hybrid drivetrain: PHEV (Grand Touring)
- Battery: 13.6 kWh NMC LGES (Grand Touring)

Dimensions
- Wheelbase: 3,025 mm (119.1 in)
- Length: 5,065 mm (199.4 in)
- Width: 2,020 mm (79.5 in)
- Height: 1,760 mm (69.3 in)

Chronology
- Predecessor: Lincoln MKT (2010–2019)

At the 2018 New York Auto Show, Lincoln unveiled a prototype version of its planned second-generation Aviator, scheduled to enter production in 2019.

A more detailed production was later introduced at the Los Angeles Auto Show on November 28, 2018. Lincoln confirmed that the Aviator would go on sale in the summer of 2019 as a 2020 model in North America and China (as the Chinese: 飞行家; pinyin: fēi háng jiā; lit. 'Aviator') afterward.

The Aviator comes standard with a 3.0-liter twin-turbocharged V6 that outputs 400 hp (298 kW; 406 PS) and 415 lb⋅ft (563 N⋅m) of torque through a 10-speed automatic transmission. The Aviator Grand Touring's powertrain outputs 494 hp (368 kW) and 630 lb⋅ft (854 N⋅m) of torque from a 3.0-liter twin-turbocharged V6 and a 75 kW (101 hp; 102 PS) electric motor in a plug-in hybrid system.

=== Overview ===
The 2018 Aviator prototype marked the debut of an all-new vehicle platform for Ford Motor Company; while the vehicle is RWD, the architecture is designed for multiple powertrain layouts, including all-wheel drive (AWD) and front-wheel drive (FWD). The second-generation Aviator shares its platform architecture with the sixth-generation Explorer. While again mechanically related to the Explorer, the Aviator received its own styling.

The Aviator is the first Lincoln model to offer a plug-in hybrid (PHEV) powertrain.

Several technological features debuted on the 2018 prototype Aviator. Tying the vehicle camera system with the continuously controlled dampers, Suspension Preview Technology looks at the road ahead for surface irregularities (i.e., potholes), preparing the suspension for impact and its effect on vehicle ride. Phone as a Key allows an Aviator to be driven without keys; the technology allows the smartphone of the owner to serve as the vehicle key fob, with the door-mounted keyless entry keypad allowing access in the event of phone battery failure (the interior is designed with wireless charging for smartphones).

A number of safety technology features were included, with Lincoln CoPilot360 packaging automatic emergency braking with pedestrian detection, a blind-spot information system with cross-traffic alert, lane-keeping system, lane centering, reverse camera, and auto high-beams. Reverse Brake Assist applies the brakes if the vehicle detects an object when the transmission is in reverse.

Lincoln designers worked with the Detroit Symphony Orchestra to compose 25 unique sound effects to be used for the door chime and other indicator alerts for the Aviator.

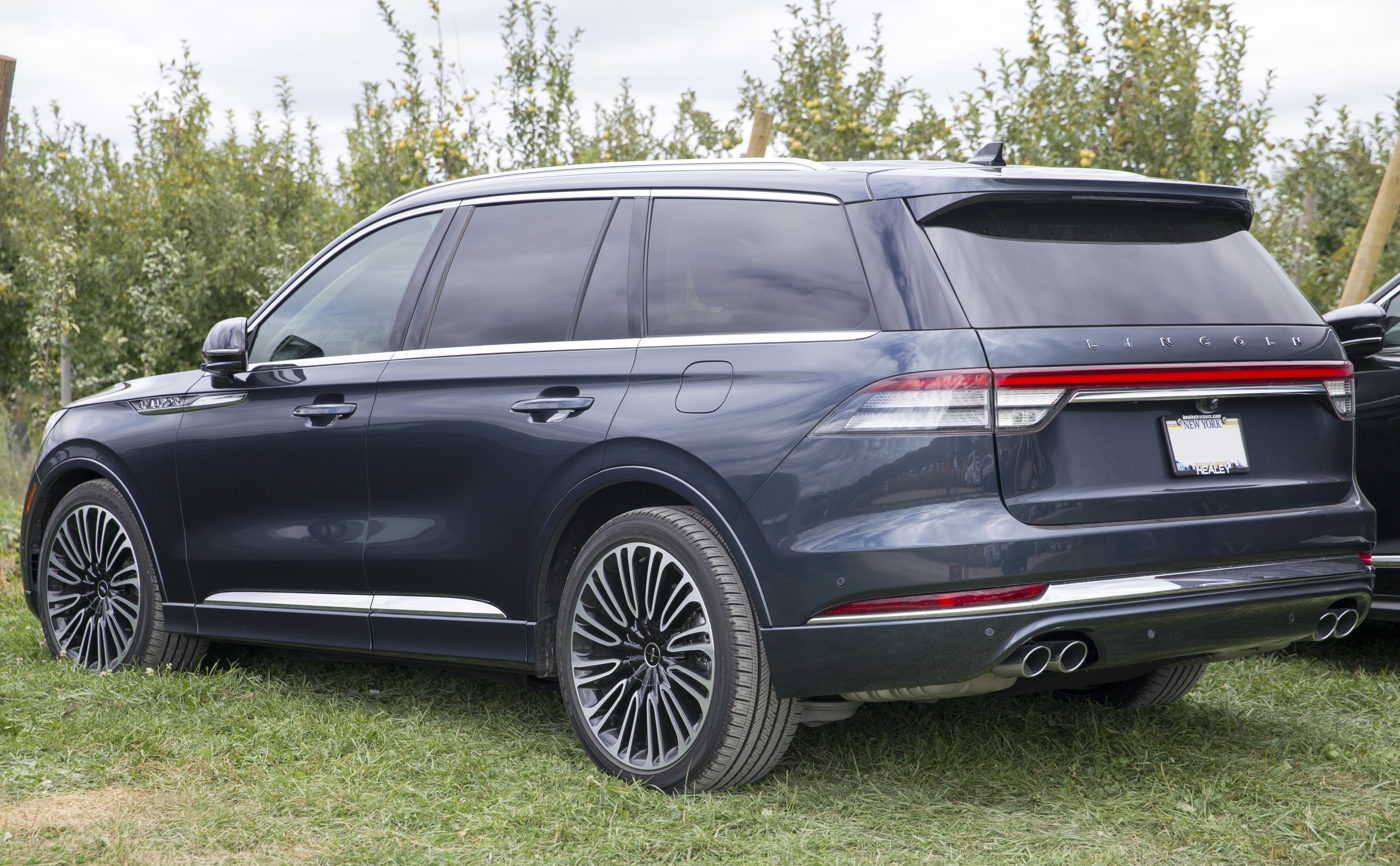
Rear view

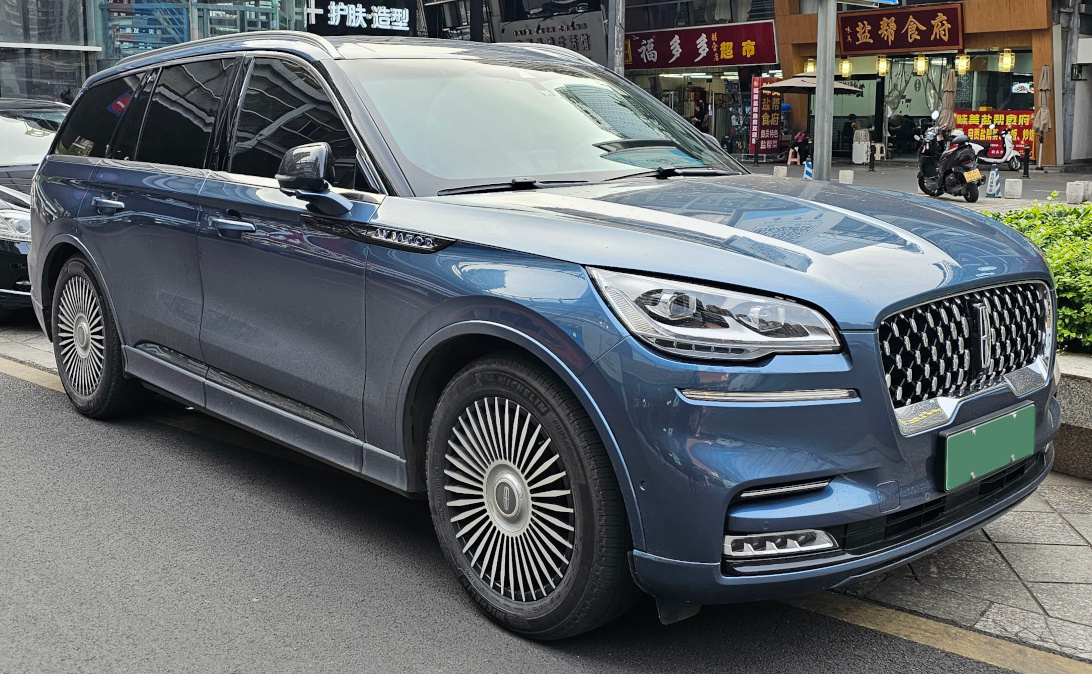
Aviator PHEV (China, import)

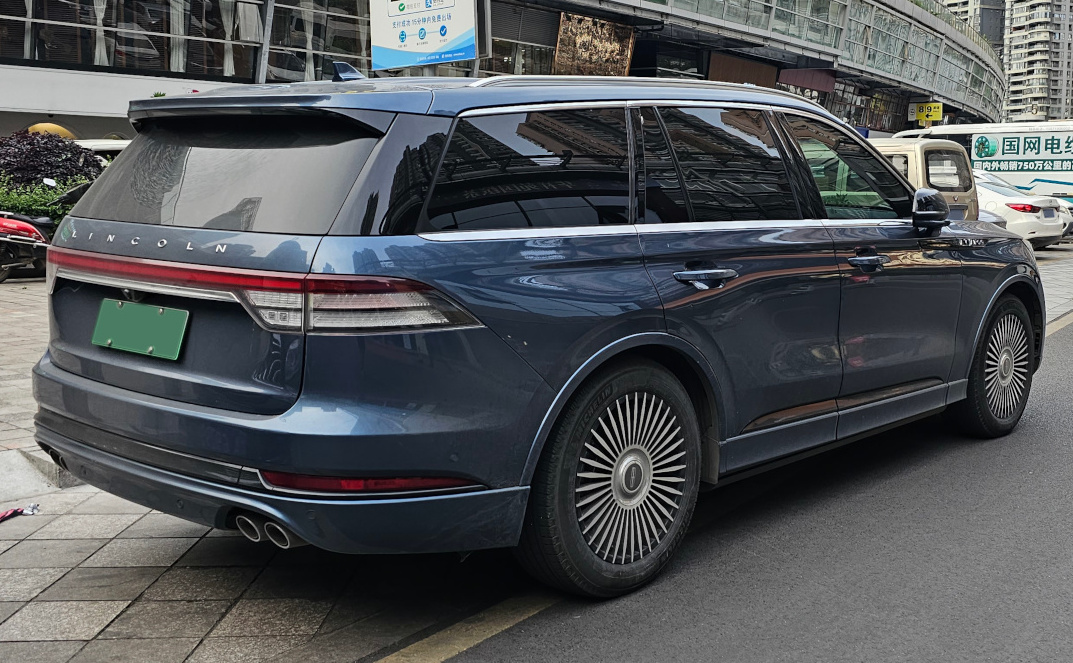
Aviator PHEV (China, import)

=== 2025 refresh ===
The facelifted Aviator was revealed on February 5, 2024, for the 2025 model year. It features a redesigned front fascia, refreshed interior and redesigned headlights. The plug-in hybrid Grand Touring trim was discontinued for 2024.

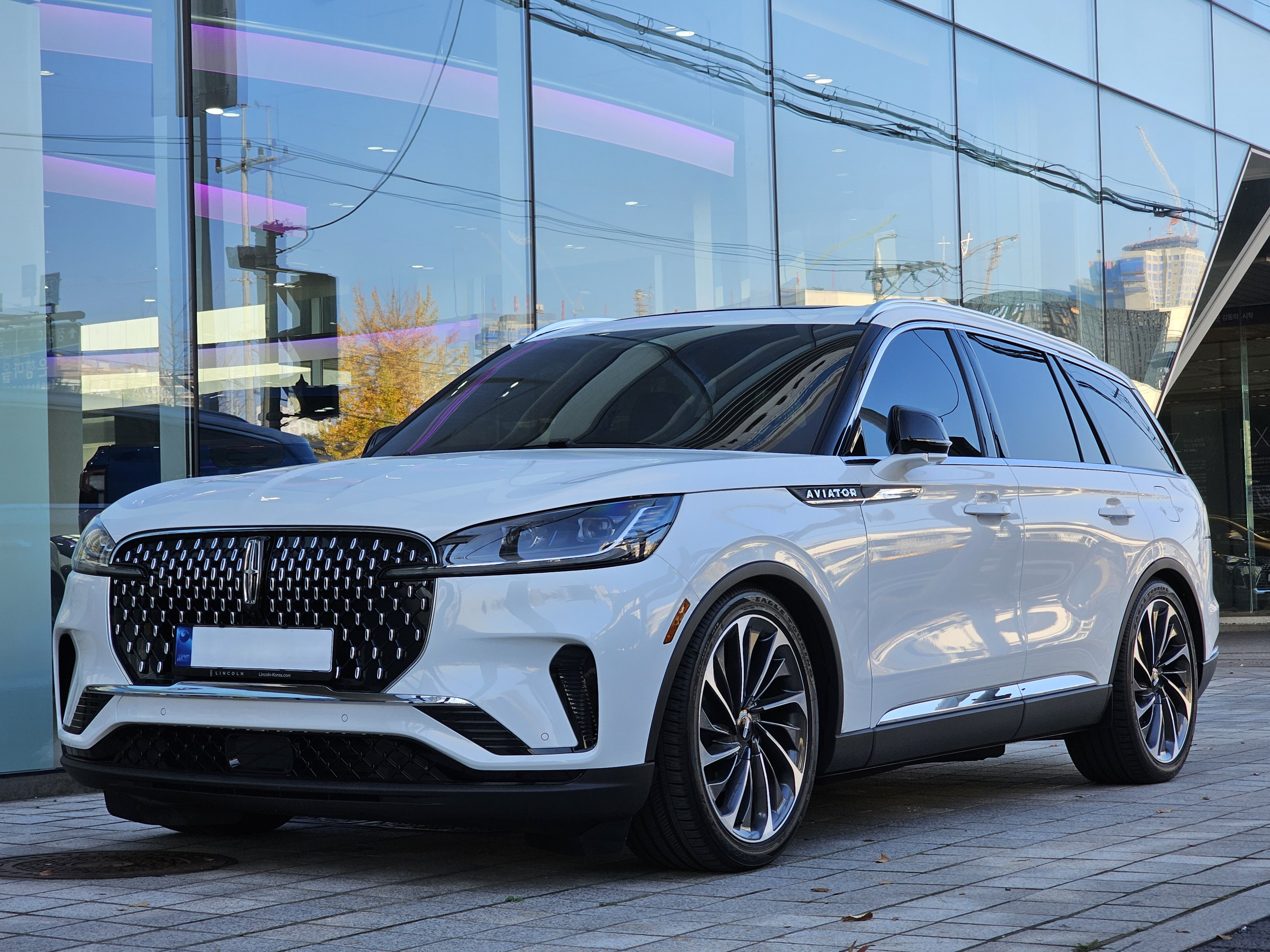
Front View

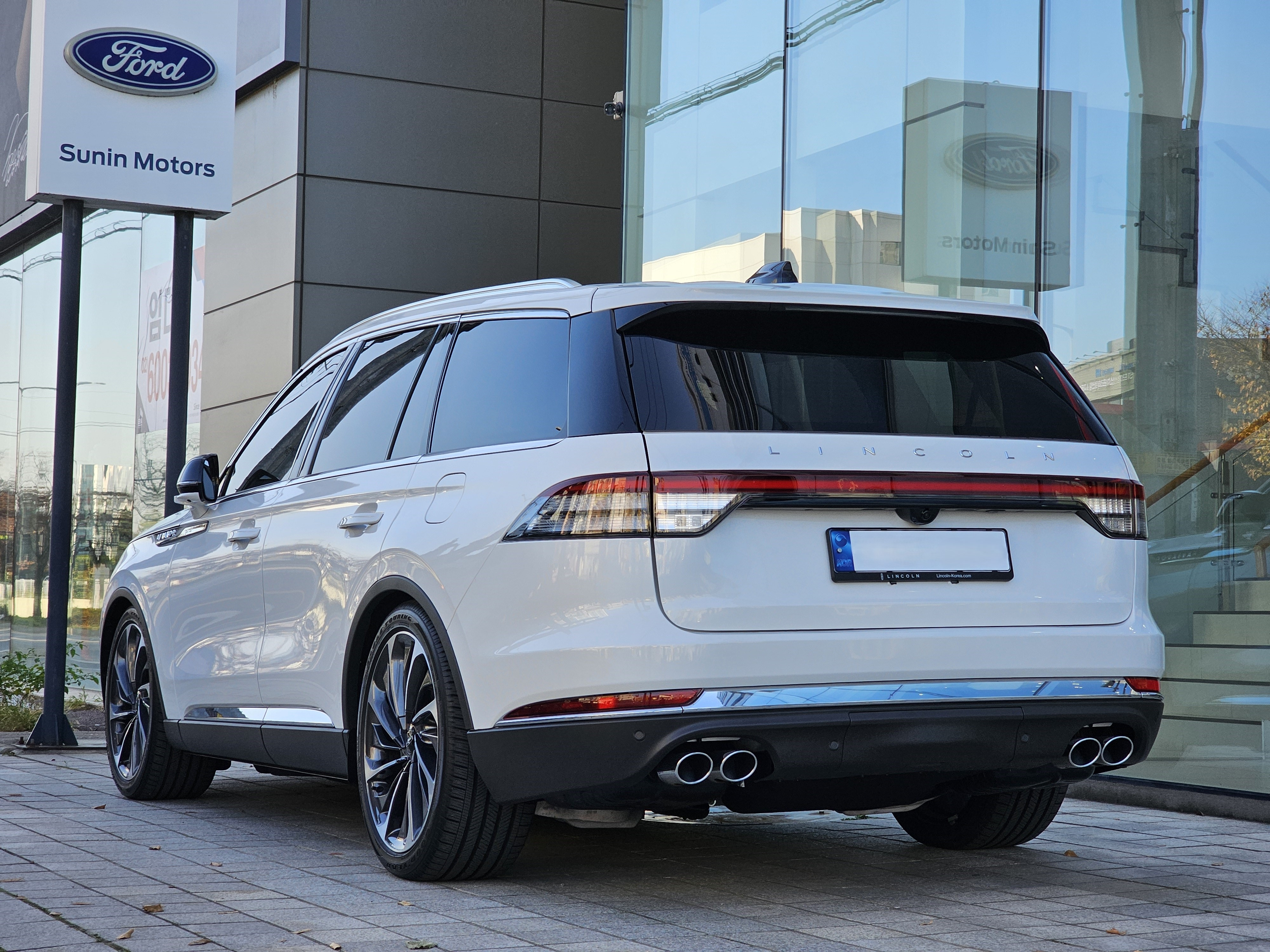
Rear View

=== Safety ===
NHTSA crash test ratings (2020):

- Front Impact Rating:
- Side Impact Rating:
- Rollover Rating: 15.1%

2020 Lincoln Aviator IIHS Ratings
| Category | Rating |
|---|---|
| Small overlap front | Good |
| Moderate overlap front | Good |
| Side impact | Good |
| Roof strength | Good |
| Head restraints & seats | Good |

== Aviator EX8 (2027) ==
The Aviator EX8 is a plug-in hybrid / range extender version built by Changan Ford exclusively for the Chinese market. It is unrelated to the U611 model.

== Recalls ==
=== 2026 recall ===
In June 2026 Ford issued a recall order of over 741,000 vehicles, including the Aviator, in the U.S. due to a transmission issue that may damage the park system.

== Sales ==
| Calendar year | US | Canada | China |
|---|---|---|---|
| 2002 | 1,856 | | —N/a |
| 2003 | 29,517 | | —N/a |
| 2004 | 23,644 | | —N/a |
| 2005 | 15,873 | 664 | —N/a |
| 2006 | 1,711 | | —N/a |
| 2019 | 8,323 | 678 | —N/a |
| 2020 | 23,080 | 1,941 | 8,818 |
| 2021 | 20,924 | 2,043 | 14,256 |
| 2022 | 21,977 | | 6,297 |
| 2023 | 15,551 | | 4,867 |
| 2024 | 25,235 | 2,027 | 3,828 |
| 2025 | 24,373 | | 1,855 |
