= Grade I and II* listed buildings in the London Borough of Southwark =

There are over 9,000 Grade I listed buildings and 20,000 Grade II* listed buildings in England. This page is a list of these buildings in the London Borough of Southwark.

== Grade I ==
Name	Location	Type	Completed (Note: The date given is the date used by Historic England as significant for the initial building or that of an important part in the structure's description.)	Date designated	Grid ref. (Note: Sometimes known as OSGB36, the grid reference is based on the British national grid reference system used by the Ordnance Survey.) Geo-coordinates	Entry number (Note: The "List Entry Number" is a unique number assigned to each listed building and scheduled monument by Historic England.)	Image
Southwark Cathedral	Borough, Southwark	Cathedral	19th century	2 March 1950	TQ3268080311; 51°30′22″N 0°05′23″W	1378460	Southwark Cathedral More images
Church of St Peter	Liverpool Grove, Walworth, Southwark	Church	1823–1825	2 March 1950	TQ3253178127; 51°29′12″N 0°05′33″W	1385662	Church of St Peter More images
The George Inn	77 Borough High Street, Southwark	Coaching Inn	16th century	2 March 1950	TQ3266180089; 51°30′15″N 0°05′24″W	1378357	The George Inn More images
Tower Bridge (that Part That Lies Within the Borough of Southwark)	Bermondsey, Southwark	Suspension Bridge	1886–1894	6 December 1949	TQ3364580196; 51°30′18″N 0°04′33″W	1385980	Tower Bridge (that Part That Lies Within the Borough of Southwark) More images

== Grade II* ==
Name	Location	Type	Completed	Date designated	Grid ref. Geo-coordinates	Entry number	Image
Bell House	College Road, Dulwich, Southwark	House	1767	30 June 1954	TQ3321273470; 51°26′40″N 0°05′04″W	1385409	Bell House More images
Church of St Augustine	Lynton Road, Southwark	Church	1875–1878	27 September 1972	TQ3453578487; 51°29′22″N 0°03′49″W	1385687	Church of St Augustine More images
Church of St George the Martyr	Borough High Street, Southwark	Gate Pier	1734–1736	2 March 1950	TQ3249179763; 51°30′05″N 0°05′33″W	1378366	Church of St George the Martyr More images
Church of St Giles	Camberwell, Southwark	Church	1842–1844	30 June 1954	TQ3296576633; 51°28′23″N 0°05′13″W	1378398	Church of St Giles More images
Church of St James	Thurland Road, Southwark	Church	1827–1829	6 December 1949	TQ3429379336; 51°29′49″N 0°04′00″W	1385962	Church of St James More images
Church of St Mary Magdalene	Bermondsey Street, Southwark	Church	15th century	6 December 1949	TQ3331179459; 51°29′54″N 0°04′51″W	1376567	Church of St Mary Magdalene More images
Church of St Mary Rotherhithe	St Marychurch Street, Southwark	Church	Medieval	6 December 1949	TQ3517279848; 51°30′05″N 0°03′14″W	1385867	Church of St Mary Rotherhithe More images
Church of St Paul	Herne Hill, Southwark	Church	1843–1844	30 June 1954	TQ3216074583; 51°27′17″N 0°05′57″W	1385599	Church of St Paul More images
Dulwich College, Main Building	Dulwich, Southwark	School	1866–1870	27 September 1972	TQ3319673006; 51°26′25″N 0°05′06″W	1385418	Dulwich College, Main Building More images
Dulwich Picture Gallery and Mausoleum	Dulwich, Southwark	Art Gallery	Late 19th century	30 June 1954	TQ3308473628; 51°26′46″N 0°05′11″W	1385543	Dulwich Picture Gallery and Mausoleum More images
Guy's Hospital main building including wings and chapel	Borough, Southwark	Hospital	1774–1777	27 September 1972	TQ3279380084; 51°30′15″N 0°05′17″W	1385877	Guy's Hospital main building including wings and chapel More images
Half Moon public house	Half Moon Lane, Herne Hill	Public House	1896	17 September 1998	TQ3207474332; 51°27′09″N 0°06′02″W	1385592	Half Moon public house More images
Hopton's Almshouses, Hopton Gardens	10–11 Hopton Gardens, Southwark	Meeting Hall	1746–1759	2 March 1950	TQ3185480349; 51°30′24″N 0°06′05″W	1385622	Hopton's Almshouses, Hopton Gardens More images
Hoptons Almshouses, Hopton Gardens	1–9 Hopton Street, Southwark	Almshouse	1746–1749	2 March 1950	TQ3183080362; 51°30′25″N 0°06′07″W	1385621	Hoptons Almshouses, Hopton Gardens
Hoptons Almshouses, Hopton Gardens	12–21 Hopton Street, Southwark	Almshouse	1746–1749	2 March 1950	TQ3183280330; 51°30′24″N 0°06′07″W	1385623	Hoptons Almshouses, Hopton Gardens
Mary Sheridan House (part) and Area Railings	11–13 St Thomas Street, Borough, Southwark	Terraced House	Early 18th century	6 December 1949	TQ3279780177; 51°30′18″N 0°05′17″W	1385874	Mary Sheridan House (part) and Area Railings More images
Nelson House Including Railings to Steps	265 Rotherhithe Street, Southwark	House	c. 1740	6 December 1949	TQ3655880223; 51°30′16″N 0°02′02″W	1385837	Nelson House Including Railings to Steps More images
Number 142 and Attached Railings	142 Long lane, Southwark	House	c. 1732	6 December 1949	TQ3287779589; 51°29′59″N 0°05′13″W	1385666	Number 142 and Attached Railings More images
Number 9 and Attached Railings	9 St Thomas Street, Southwark	Treasurers House	c. 1706	6 December 1949	TQ3278080184; 51°30′18″N 0°05′18″W	1385872	Number 9 and Attached Railings More images
Obelisk at the Centre of St George's Circus	Elephant and Castle, Southwark	Obelisk	1771	2 March 1950	TQ3165179453; 51°29′55″N 0°06′17″W	1385642	Obelisk at the Centre of St George's Circus More images
Remains of Winchester Palace	Borough, Southwark	Bishops Palace	Early 14th century	2 March 1950	TQ3257280391; 51°30′25″N 0°05′28″W	1378484	Remains of Winchester Palace More images
Six Pillars	Crescent Wood Road, Sydenham, SE26	House	1935	16 January 1981	TQ3408972226; 51°25′59″N 0°04′21″W	1385456	Six Pillars More images
Southwark Adult Education Institute	formerly Pioneer Health Centre, St Mary's Road, Peckham, Southwark	Further Education College	1972	27 September 1972	TQ3527676588; 51°28′20″N 0°03′13″W	1385863	Southwark Adult Education Institute More images
St Olaf House	London Bridge, Southwark	Sculpture	1931	13 May 1971	TQ3290380352; 51°30′23″N 0°05′11″W	1385977	St Olaf House More images
St Saviour's War Memorial	High Street, Southwark	War memorial	1922	23 March 2018	TQ3259680097; 51°30′15″N 0°05′27″W	1378368	St Saviour's War Memorial More images
Thames Tunnel (that Part which lies in London Borough of Southwark)	Southwark	Tunnel	1825–43	24 March 1995	TQ3518479963; 51°30′09″N 0°03′13″W	1378391	Thames Tunnel (that Part which lies in London Borough of Southwark) More images
67 Grange Walk	67 Grange Walk, Bermondsey, Southwark	House	Early 18th century	27 September 1972	TQ3345279267; 51°29′48″N 0°04′44″W	1385574	67 Grange Walk More images
9a St Thomas Street	9A St Thomas Street, Borough, Southwark	Museum	1901	6 December 1949	TQ3276380190; 51°30′18″N 0°05′19″W	1385873	9a St Thomas Street More images
Subway, Vestibule, Terrace and Stairs to the Crystal Palace	Crystal Palace	Subway		26 September 1972	TQ3379170972; 51°25′19″N 0°04′38″W	1385457	Subway, Vestibule, Terrace and Stairs to the Crystal Palace More images
