= Steve Waller =

British musician (1951–2000)

- Steve Waller performing

Background information
- Born: Steven Charles Waller; 30 June 1951; Herne Hill, South London, England
- Died: 6 February 2000 (aged 48) Stroud, Gloucestershire, England
- Genres: Rock, progressive rock
- Instruments: Guitar, vocals
- Years active: 1972–1996
- Formerly of: Manfred Mann's Earth Band, Gonzalez

Stephen Charles Waller (30 June 1951 – 6 February 2000) was a British musician best known as the lead guitarist and a vocalist for Manfred Mann's Earth Band between 1979 and 1983. He featured on the albums Angel Station, Chance, I (Who Have Nothing), Somewhere in Afrika and Budapest Live and was the replacement for Earth Band guitarist Dave Flett, who left the band in 1978.

Raised in Herne Hill, South London, England, Waller attended William Penn Secondary School in Dulwich. Both his parents were musicians and played in skiffle bands. Waller was a self-taught guitarist, with B.B. King being a big inspiration, and described himself to others saying, "I am an entertainer first".

From 1974 onwards, Waller was a mainstay of the renowned Sunday jam sessions at the Half Moon, Herne Hill, alongside his school friend Stevie Smith. He went on to join Manfred Mann's Earth Band after Manfred Mann was, "recommended to check out a popular South London circuit musician – a singer and guitarist" who played there. It is noted that, "Waller was indeed the right man for the job. One quick audition and it was all settled".

Stevie Smith recalls that in the mid-1970s, the Sunday jam session featuring Waller at the Half Moon, Herne Hill, "was the place where the musos used to check out what was going on – we had the guys down from the Rory Gallagher Band, Thin Lizzy and the Jeff Beck Band."

Waller played on the 1979 hit album Haven't Stopped Dancin' by British R&B and funk band Gonzalez, which peaked at number 26 in the Billboard Hot 100 chart in January 1979. He is also credited for guitar on the 1996 album Sentimentally Yours by Peter Skellern. Earlier in his career, Waller worked with Roger Ruskin Spear, and Kevin Coyne. In 1990, he had an acting role as a pianist feigning a heart attack in the British movie Paper Mask.

After leaving Manfred Mann's Earth Band in 1983, Waller returned to the pub gig circuit with his new band, Steve Waller's Overload, and his alma mater the Half Moon, Herne Hill again became a regular venue. The band included John "Poli" Palmer, from Family, and drummer Glen LeFleur. Peter Stroud, the bass player in Steve Waller's Overload, described him as the, "Lowell George of South London – he could play with such soul and depth." With his shock of dark hair and full beard, virtuoso guitar playing, and stagecraft (including a talent for mimicry), Waller was a recognisable figure in London's live music scene during the latter part of the 1980s and early 1990s.

In 1993, Waller went to live in Stroud, Gloucestershire with his cousin. He became well-known there as a local busker and the "Man in the Red Hat". He recorded an album of his own songs, plus lyrics contributed by Melanie White aka Ruth Whitney ("Qualified" "The Things we do for a Crust", "She Saw the Deer Today" and "Checking Out the Bins" ), at the DB Studios in Stroud. His last album was called Last Tracks to Freedom. He collaborated on albums of Melanie White's stories, for example The Cardboard Cut-Out, for which he wrote a song – the ballad "One Rule for Him, One Rule for Her", quoting Melanie's catchphrase of the moment. He died in Stroud on 6 February 2000, aged 48, after experiencing liver problems.

A sold-out benefit concert was held for Steve at the Half Moon, Herne Hill shortly after his death in 2000, to support his family with funeral costs. Between 40–50 musicians turned up to play for free at the benefit event. Waller was held in tremendous affection among the local community in Herne Hill, where he would always encourage new musicians to come onstage and play at the famous Half Moon Sunday jams. It is recalled that he had a great sense of humour, the sound of his laughter was "of huge and infectious proportions", and that "everybody wanted to be on stage with him".

The sleeve notes for the "Night Life" CD of Steve Waller's Overload, originally recorded in February 1990, but remixed and remastered for release after his death in 2000, state, "Equally at home playing blues, r&b, soul or rock, he and the band thrilled many an audience. He had musical ears, forever hearing different melodies, phrases or rhythms to the delight of both audience and fellow musicians. He was an inspiration."
