= Highpoint I =

London apartment block

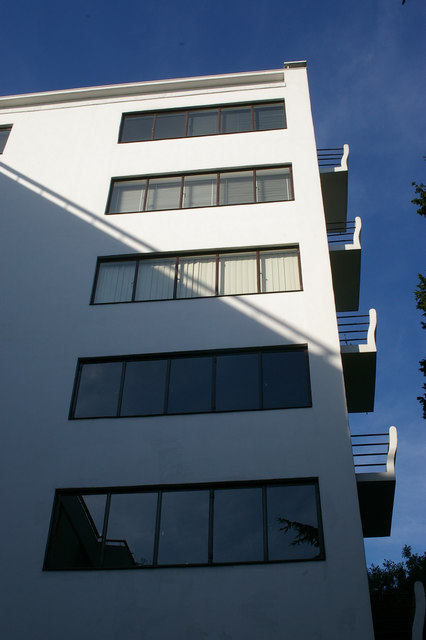
- Corner detail of Highpoint 1, showing balcony profiles.
- Interactive map of the Highpoint I area

General information
- Type: Residential
- Architectural style: International style
- Location: North Hill, Highgate, London, N6 4BA, United Kingdom, London, United Kingdom
- Coordinates: 51.5749°N 0.1507°W
- Completed: 1935

Design and construction
- Architect: Berthold Lubetkin
- Structural engineer: Ove Arup

Listed Building – Grade I
- Designated: 10 May 1974
- Reference no.: 1358885
- Main contractor: J. L. Kier & Co Ltd

Highpoint I was the first of two apartment blocks erected in the 1930s on one of the highest points in London, England, in Highgate. The architectural design was by the Georgian-British architect Berthold Lubetkin, the structural design by the Anglo-Danish engineer Ove Arup and the construction by Kier.

== History ==
Highpoint I was built in 1935 for the entrepreneur Sigmund Gestetner, but was never used for its intended purpose of housing Gestetner company staff. One of the best examples of early International style architecture in London, this block of 64 flats was very innovative in its day.

When the building was completed, it became widely renowned as the finest example of this form of construction for residential purposes. When Corbusier himself visited Highpoint in 1935 he said, "This beautiful building .... at Highgate is an achievement of the first rank." And the American critic Henry Russell Hitchcock called it, "One of the finest, if not absolutely the finest, middle-class housing projects in the world." In 1970 this reputation gained official recognition when both Highpoint blocks were classified Grade I within the historic buildings listing programme.

The architectural historian Dan Cruickshank selected Highpoint as one of his eight choices for the 2002 BBC book The Story of Britain's Best Buildings.

In 2014, a studio on the second floor of Highpoint was listed for £400,000, a two-bedroom for £950,000 and a four-bedroom for £1,399,000. In 2017, Highpoint II's penthouse, former home of Lubetkin, was listed for sale at £2,950,000 by The Modern House.

== Highpoint II ==
Lubetkin lived in Highpoint I's penthouse until the completion of Highpoint II. The second Lubetkin building in the same style, Highpoint II (a more luxurious version), was completed on an adjoining site in 1938. This is also a Grade I Listed Building.

It served as the exterior of Emma Peel's flat in the television series The Avengers in the 1960s.
