= St James's Church, Bermondsey =

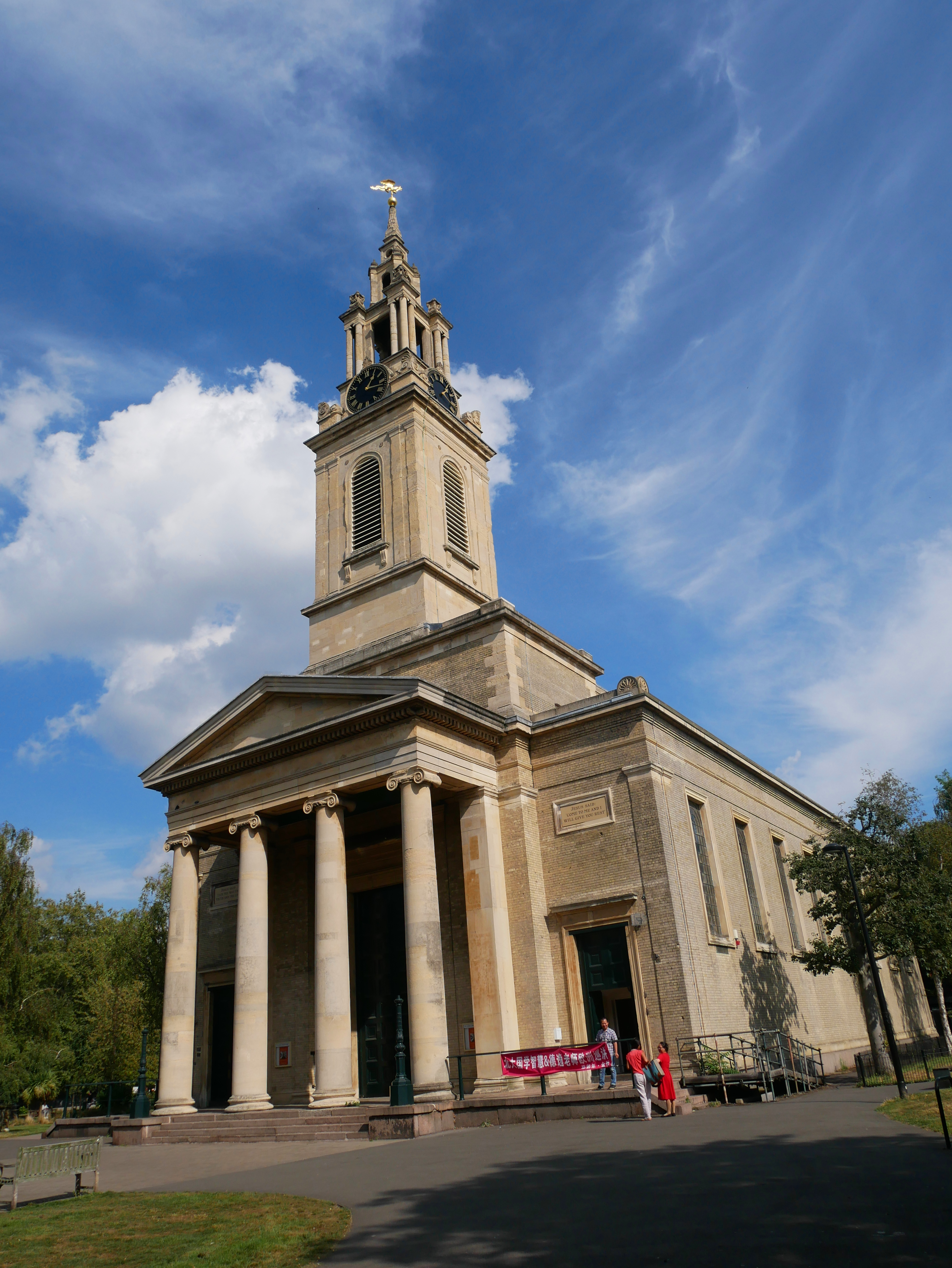
- St James's Church, Bermondsey
- 51.4970°N 0.0668°W
- Location: Bermondsey, London
- Country: England
- Denomination: Church of England
- Website: www.godlovesbermondsey.co.uk/our-history.php

History
- Status: Active
- Consecrated: 7 May 1829

Architecture
- Heritage designation: II*
- Designated: 6 December 1949
- Architect: James Savage
- Style: Neo-classical
- Years built: 1827–1829

Administration
- Province: Canterbury
- Archdiocese: Canterbury
- Diocese: Southwark
- Archdeaconry: Southwark
- Parish: St James', Bermondsey

St James's Church, Bermondsey, is a Church of England parish church in Bermondsey, south London. Designed by James Savage, it was one of the churches built as a result of the Church Building Acts. It was completed and consecrated in 1829 and given a separate parish (split off from the ancient parish of St Mary Magdalene's, Bermondsey) in 1840. In 1949 it was designated a Grade II* listed building.

The spire was inspired by Sir Christopher Wren’s St. Stephen Walbrook, and required a separate Act of Parliament in 1831 to borrow extra funds.

The churchyard was closed to burials in 1855, and was then used for communal drying. It was converted to gardens by the Metropolitan Public Gardens Association, and opened to the public in 1886. An obelisk memorial and some chest-tombs were retained.

== See also ==
- Grade I and II* listed buildings in the London Borough of Southwark

== Sources ==
- Philips, G.W. (1841). The History and Antiquities of the Parish of Bermondsey. London: J. Unwin.
