= St Saviour's War Memorial =

War memorial in Southwark, London

Coordinates: 51°30′15″N 0°05′27″W

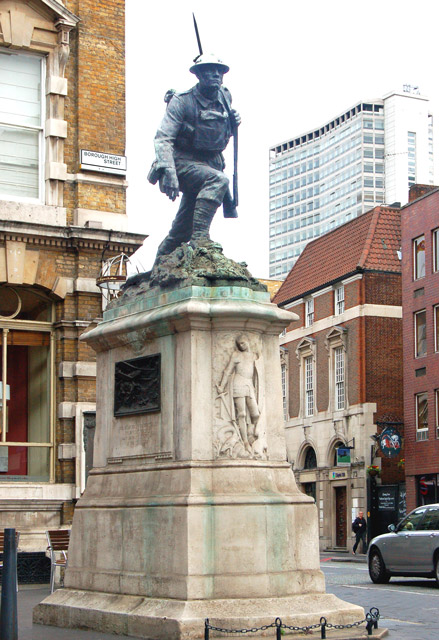
St Saviour's War Memorial

St Saviour's War Memorial is a war memorial on Borough High Street, in the former parish of Southwark St Saviour, to south of the River Thames in London. It became a Grade II listed building in 1998 and was upgraded to Grade II* in 2018.

The memorial includes a bronze sculpture by Philip Lindsey Clark. He had enlisted as a private in the Artists' Rifles in 1914, and was commissioned in the 11th (Service) (1st South Down) Battalion of the Royal Sussex Regiment in 1916, ending the war as a captain with a DSO. The figure is similar to one of three included in his Cameronians War Memorial in Glasgow, unveiled in 1924: an infantryman in battledress advancing, carrying a rifle with attached bayonet slung over his shoulder. In the Cameronians Memorial, the figure advances with the rifle held in the right hand. The bronzes for both memorials were cast by the Maneti foundry in London. A similar sculpture of an infantryman with rifle was used by Albert Toft for the Royal Fusiliers War Memorial in Holborn.

The statue stands on a high Portland stone pedestal with rounded ends. On its long sides are bronze reliefs: one with biplanes, to the west, and another with battleships, to the east. On one side below the biplanes plaque is the inscription "Give honour to the men of St. Saviours Southwark who gave their lives for the empire 1914–1918. Their names are inscribed within the parish church. May their memory live for ever in the minds of men." and on the other side below the battleships plaque is the inscription "This memorial was erected by the parishioners of Saint Saviour's Southwark in the year 1922." A model of the main figure was exhibited at the Royal Academy in 1923.

The ends of the pedestal are decorated with stone carvings of Saint George and the Dragon to the front (south), and a carving of a mourning woman with child and dove to the rear (north).

The memorial was funded by public subscription, and the design was chosen by a competition. The £4,000 raised also allowed a bronze memorial plaque by Sir John Ninian Comper to be erected in Southwark Cathedral naming 344 war dead from the parish, also cast by Maneti. Both memorials were unveiled on 16 November 1922 by General Henry Horne, 1st Baron Horne, and dedicated on the same day by the Suffragan Bishop of Woolwich, William Hough.

It was dismantled, restored and rebuilt in 2013, and rededicated in 2014 by the Dean of Southwark, Andrew Nunn.

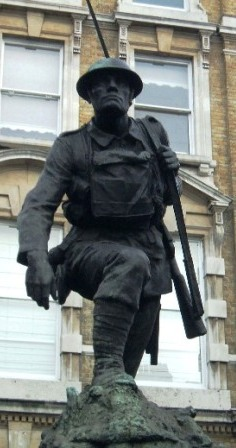

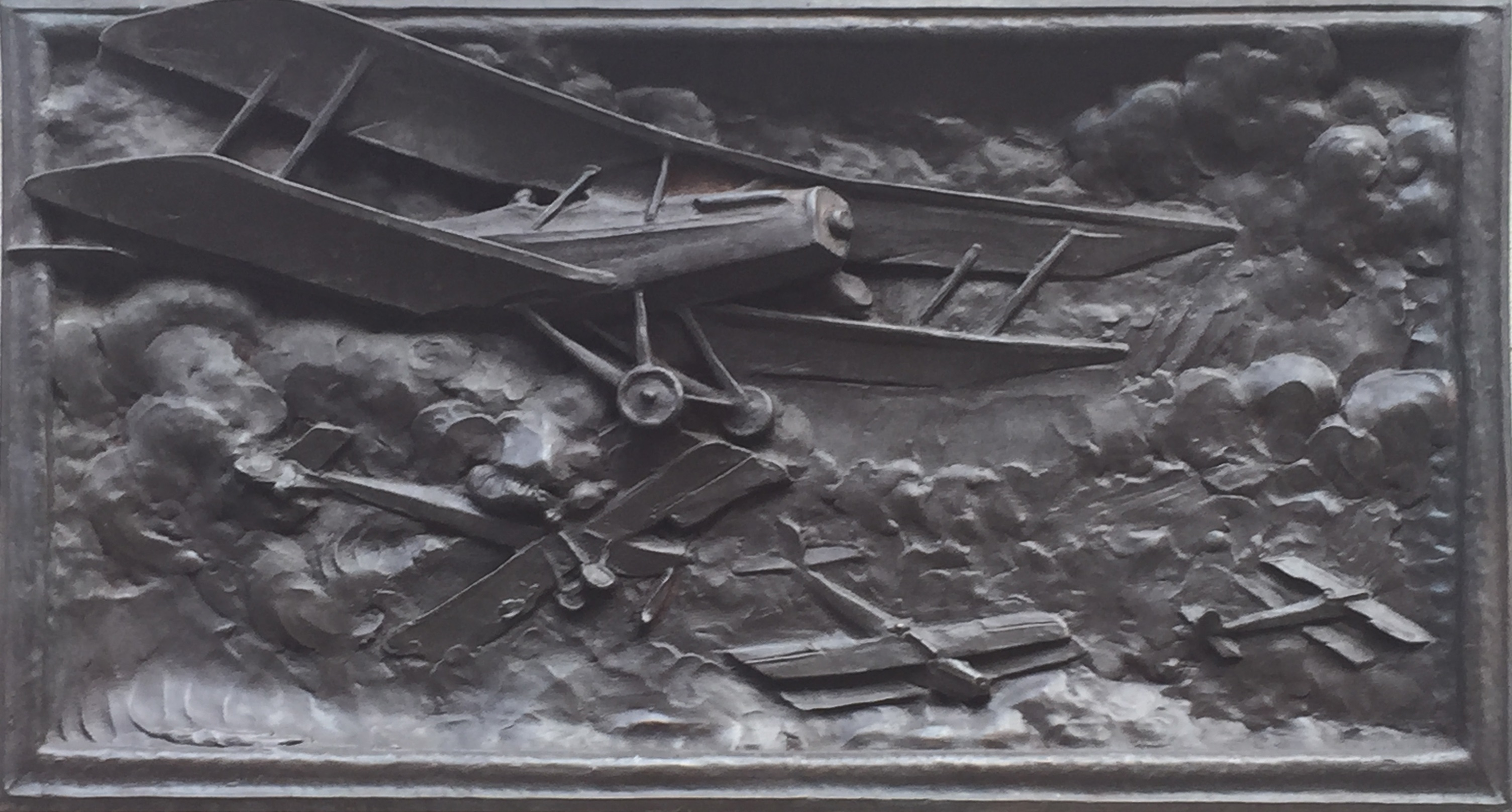

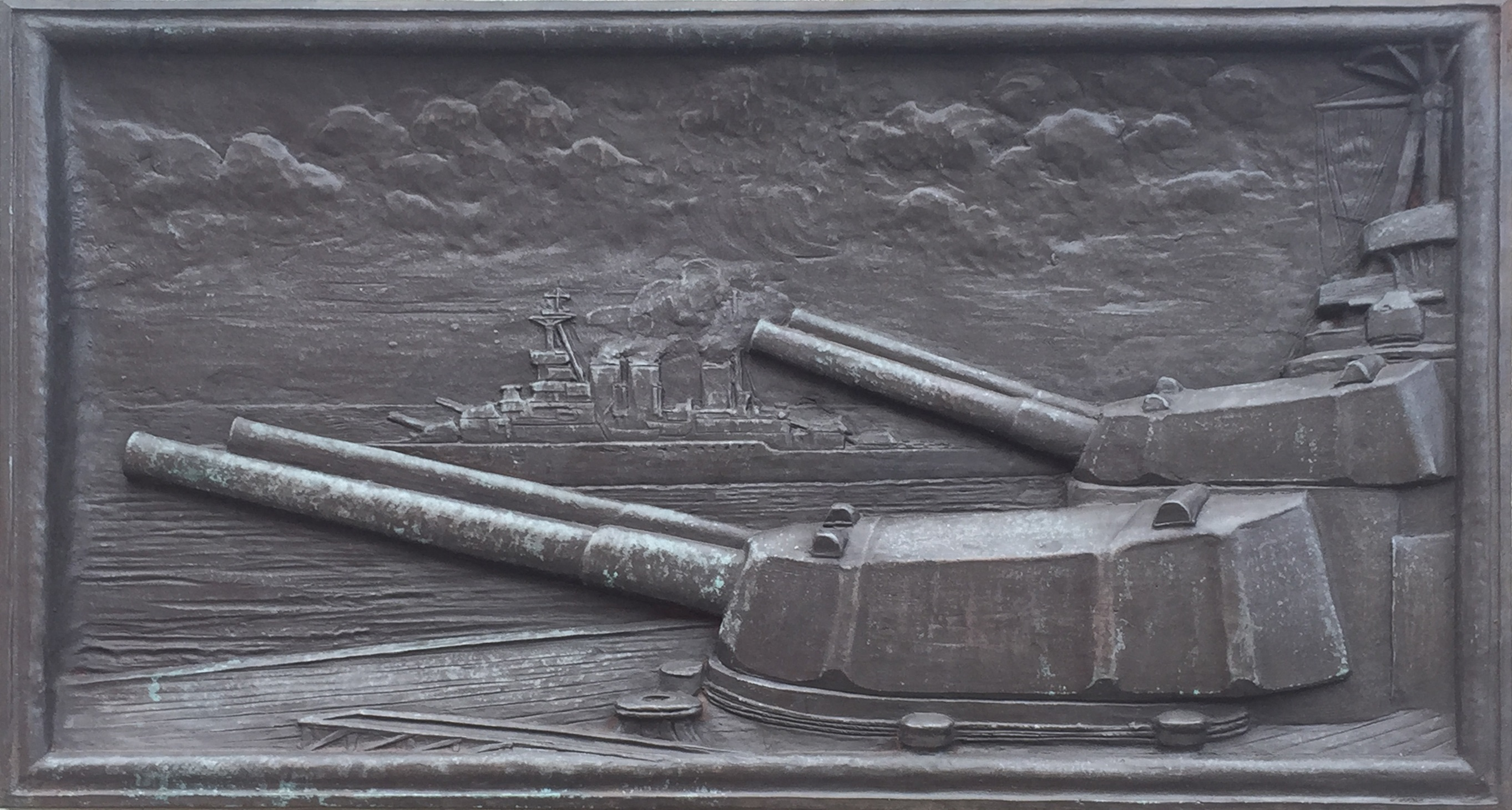

== See also ==
- Grade I and II* listed buildings in the London Borough of Southwark
- Grade II* listed war memorials in England
- List of public art in the London Borough of Southwark
