= The Modern House =

The Modern House is a British estate agent that specialises in the sale and promotion of Modernist and 20th century architecture. It was founded by Matt Gibberd and Albert Hill in 2005.

Gibberd and Hill met at school in Dorset and collected training shoes and Memphis Group furniture in their respective youths. Gibberd's grandfather was the modernist architect Frederick Gibberd. At the time the pair launched The Modern House, the pair were both editors on magazines; Gibberd was a senior editor at World of Interiors and Hill was the design editor of Wallpaper*. The idea for the estate agent arose when Hill interviewed Martie Lieberman, an estate agent of Modern houses designed by Paul Rudolph in Sarasota in Florida.

The first property sold by the estate agent was Six Pillars House, a Grade II* listed modernist house in Sydenham in south London. By 2015 the estate agent had sold 700 properties. The pair claim that they have sold properties to 17 artists that have been nominated for The Turner Prize. The offices of The Modern House are based in St Alphege's Hall, a 1930s church hall in the south London district of Borough. By 2015 the estate agent had sold 700 properties. In 2019 the average value of a property listed on The Modern House was £1.1 million. A study conducted by Rightmove in 2017 and 2018 found that properties on The Modern House "received 70 per cent more views per online listing than other agents who listed the same properties".

Writing in The Guardian in 2015 Ed Cumming felt that the website of The Modern House "shone like a beacon through the terraced fog of Zoopla and Rightmove: the Modern House. An estate agent designed like a high-concept lifestyle magazine, it had clean fonts on white space, art-standard photography and a refreshing lack of jargon". In 2019 Laura Barton wrote in The Guardian that the website of The Modern House offers a form of escapism with its "ordered beauty and outlandish prices ... How sweet life would be, we think to ourselves, if we could spend our days in such open-plan, light-filled harmony". Helen Barrett, writing in the Financial Times, felt the Modern House " ... is as much a lifestyle brand, a publisher and a heritage champion as it is a seller of houses".

In 2017 Gibberd and Hill published Ornament Is Crime, an appraisal of Modernist architecture, and Gibberd's A Modern Way to Live: 5 Design Principles from The Modern House will be published in October 2021.
