= The George Inn, Southwark =

Listed pub in London, England

The George Inn
- The pub in 2023
- Alternative names: The George

General information
- Type: Public house
- Location: Borough High Street, Southwark, London, England
- Coordinates: 51.504182°N 0.090021°W
- Year built: 17th century
- Owner: National Trust

Technical details
- Structural system: Timber framed (partly)

Design and construction
- Designations

Listed Building – Grade I
- Official name: The George Inn
- Designated: 2 March 1950
- Reference no.: 1378357

Website
- Official website

The George Inn, also known as The George, is a Grade I listed public house off Borough High Street in Southwark, London, England. Dating from the 17th century and occupying the site of an earlier inn recorded from at least the 16th century, it is the only surviving galleried coaching inn in London. The building has been owned by the National Trust since 1937, and its interior is included on the Campaign for Real Ale (CAMRA)'s National Inventory of Historic Pub Interiors, where it is rated three stars and regarded as being of "outstanding national historic importance".

== History ==
The present building dates from the 17th century and occupies the site of an earlier inn recorded from at least the 16th century. According to the Campaign for Real Ale (CAMRA), The George was rebuilt in 1676 after a major fire in Southwark. The inn stood next to The Tabard inn where Chaucer set the beginning of The Canterbury Tales. In addition to its role as a coaching inn, Charles Dickens visited The George when it operated as a coffeehouse, and the inn is mentioned in his novel Little Dorrit.

The premises were later partly used as offices by the Great Eastern Railway, which later acquired the entire site from Guy's Hospital. The company's demolition of the north range in 1874 altered the historic complex. The property passed to the National Trust in 1937 and on 2 March 1950 was designated a Grade I listed building.

The George is the only surviving galleried coaching inn in London. It was included on CAMRA's National Inventory of Historic Pub Interiors before the inventory's grading system was revised. Under the revised scheme, it is rated three stars and its interior is regarded as being "of outstanding national historic importance". As of October 2026 the pub was leased by Greene King.

== Architecture ==
=== Exterior ===
The building has three storeys with dormer windows in the roof. The western half is distinguished by open timber galleries at first and second-floor level. The lower gallery projects outward, while the upper gallery is supported by wooden columns. Behind the galleries, the walls combine brickwork and exposed timber framing, with windows and a staircase serving the upper floors.

The eastern section has a long frontage of nine windows and is built mainly of limewashed brick with horizontal bands marking each storey. Windows vary in design and date, including sash, casement and mullioned examples. The brick-built section has boxed eaves beneath the roofline, while the galleried section ends with a broad fascia. At the rear, the building includes a substantial projecting chimney stack, and some of the windows are thought to survive from an earlier phase of construction.

=== Interior ===
The interior retains a range of historic features spanning several centuries. A staircase dating from the early 18th century, repositioned during alterations in about 1730, survives with elaborately turned balusters, a moulded handrail and a substantial newel post. Ground-floor rooms preserve decorative timber panelling, moulded dado rails and cornices, while the principal front room also retains an ornate overmantel above the fireplace. Other rooms contain simpler panelling and built-in cupboards, together with early 19th-century fireplaces.

The upper floors are accessed from timber galleries overlooking the courtyard, a feature reflecting the building's origins as a coaching inn. The first-floor rooms retain historic panelling, while one of the ground-floor bars preserves early purpose-built pub fittings, some of which may date from the rebuilding of 1676. Surviving features include a large fireplace, a glazed servery, fixed bench seating and full-height timber boarding. A set of disused Victorian handpumps and a late 18th-century Parliament clock also survives within the pub.

The attic retains its historic roof structure, while the cellar includes a 17th-century plank door as well as reused timber beams and masonry that may incorporate material from an earlier, possibly medieval, building.

== Gallery ==
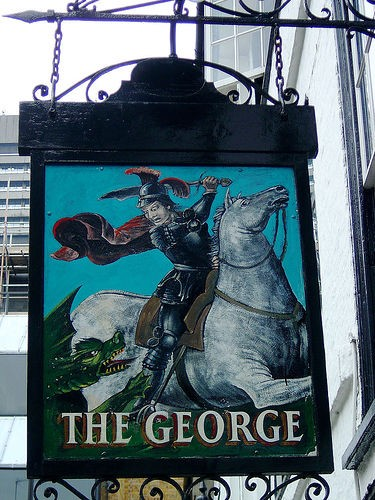
The sign depicts Saint George slaying a dragon

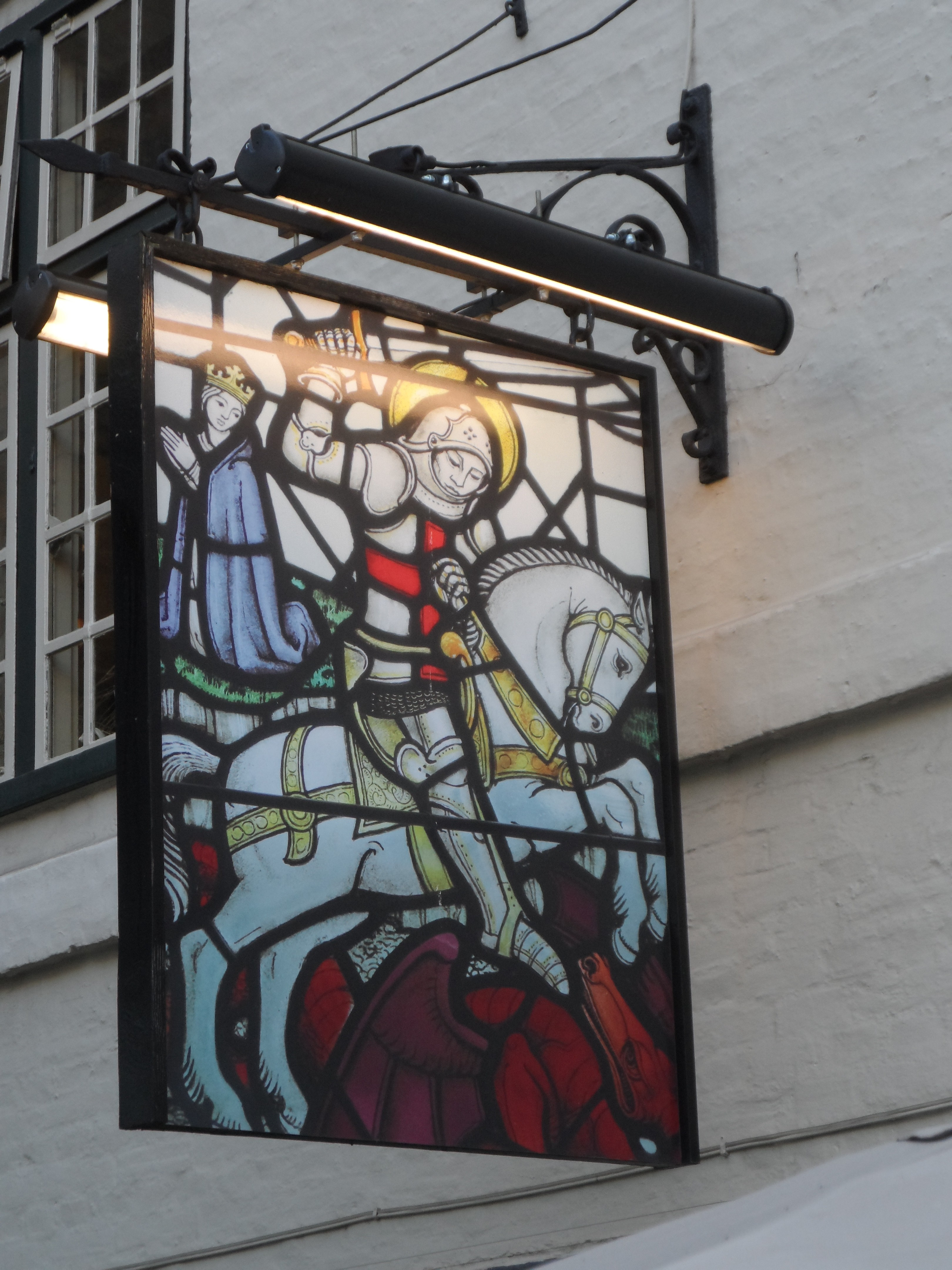
Secondary sign, with another depiction of Saint George slaying the dragon

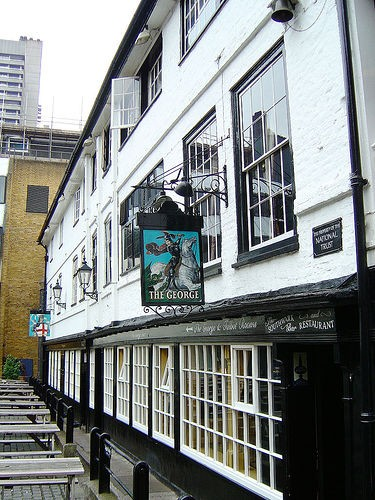

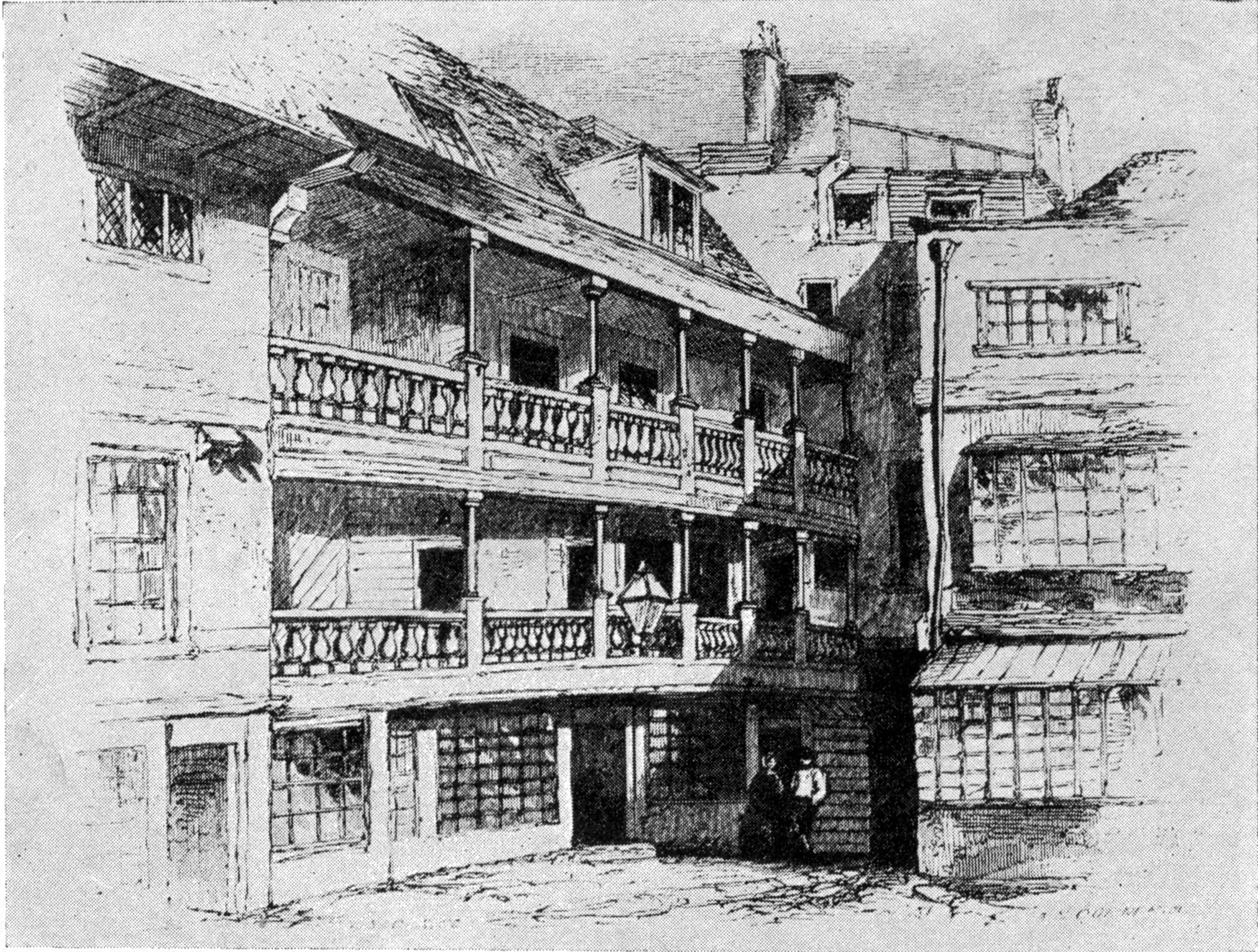
Inn, 1858

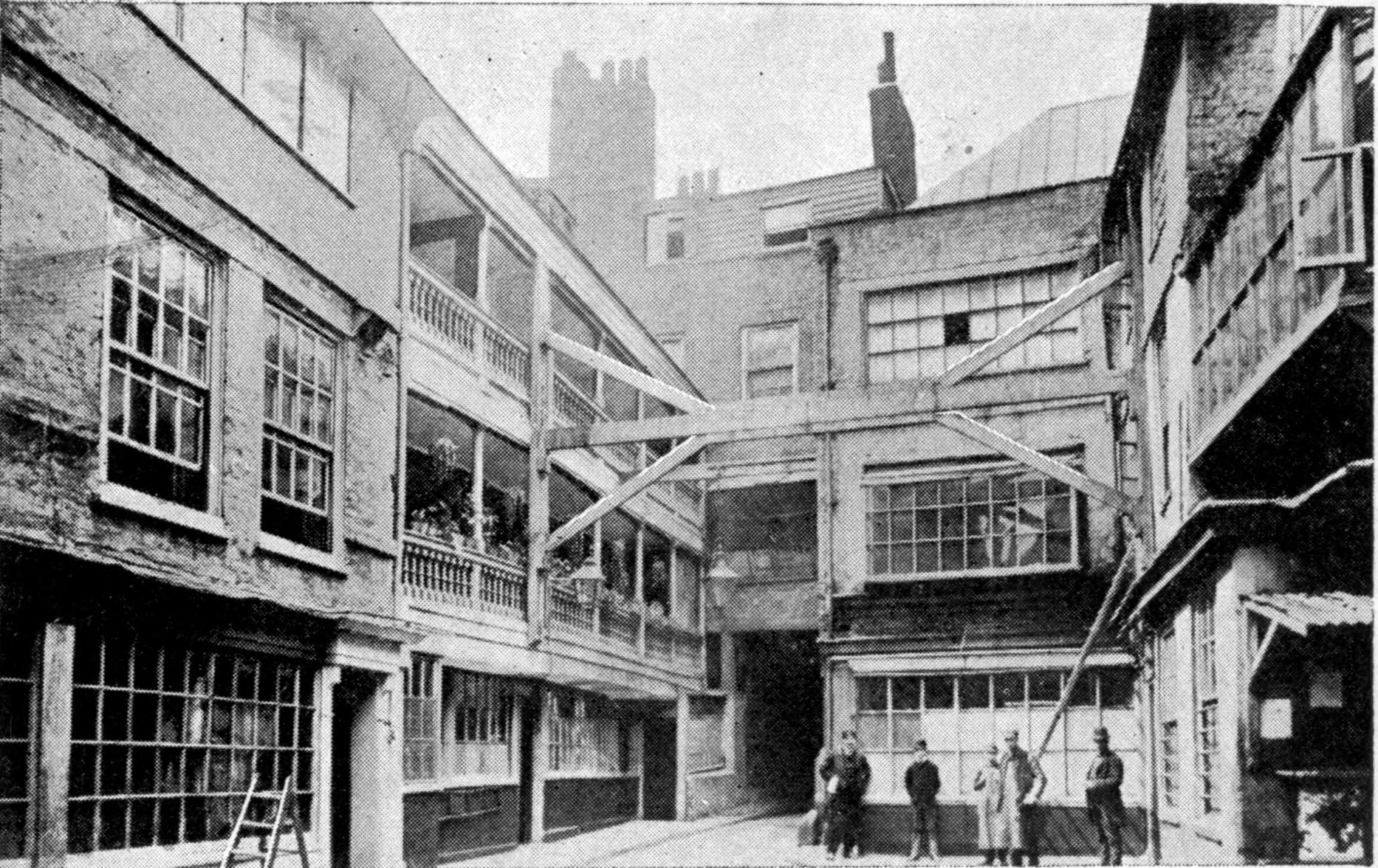
Inn, 1889

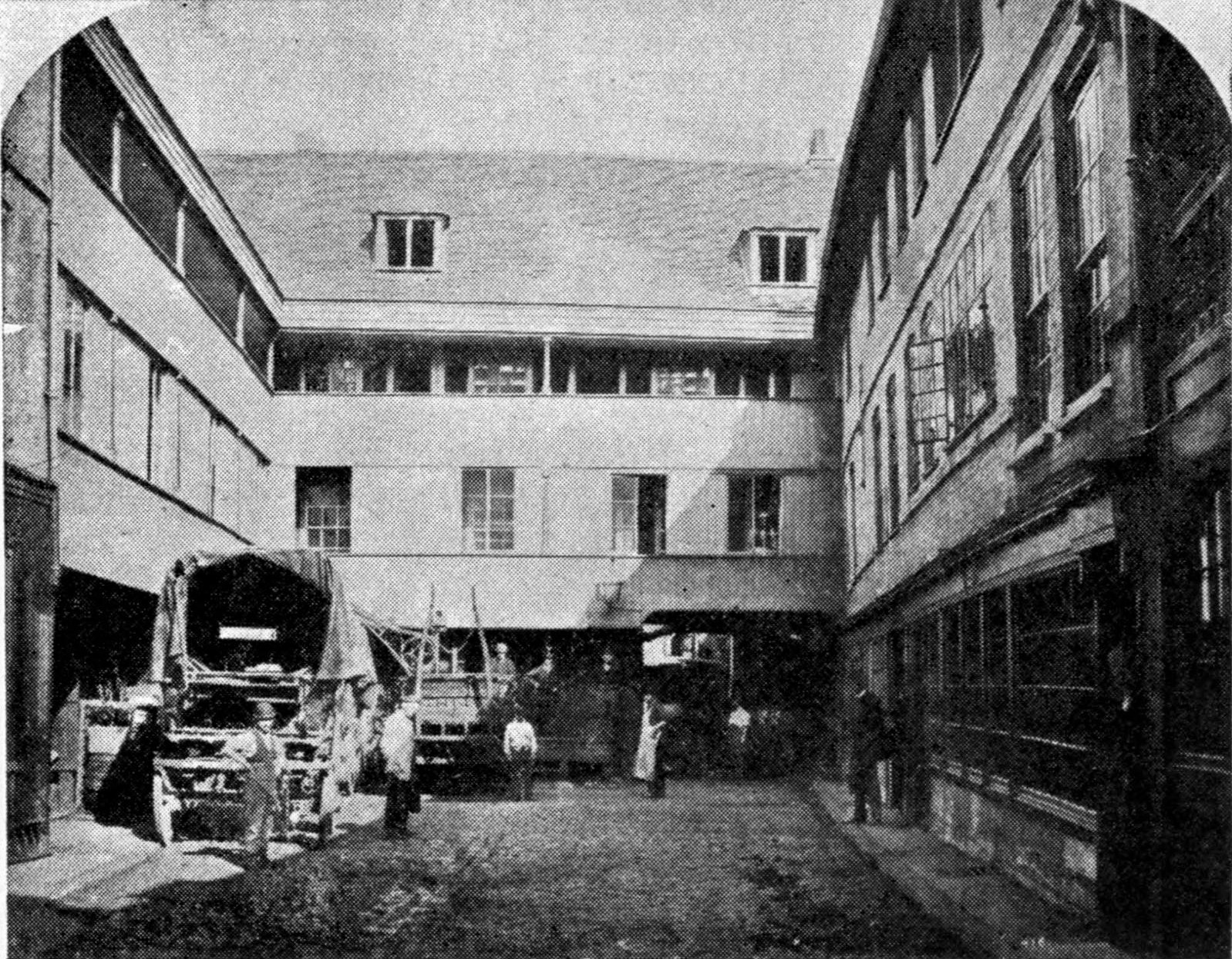
Rear of inn and coach yard, 1889

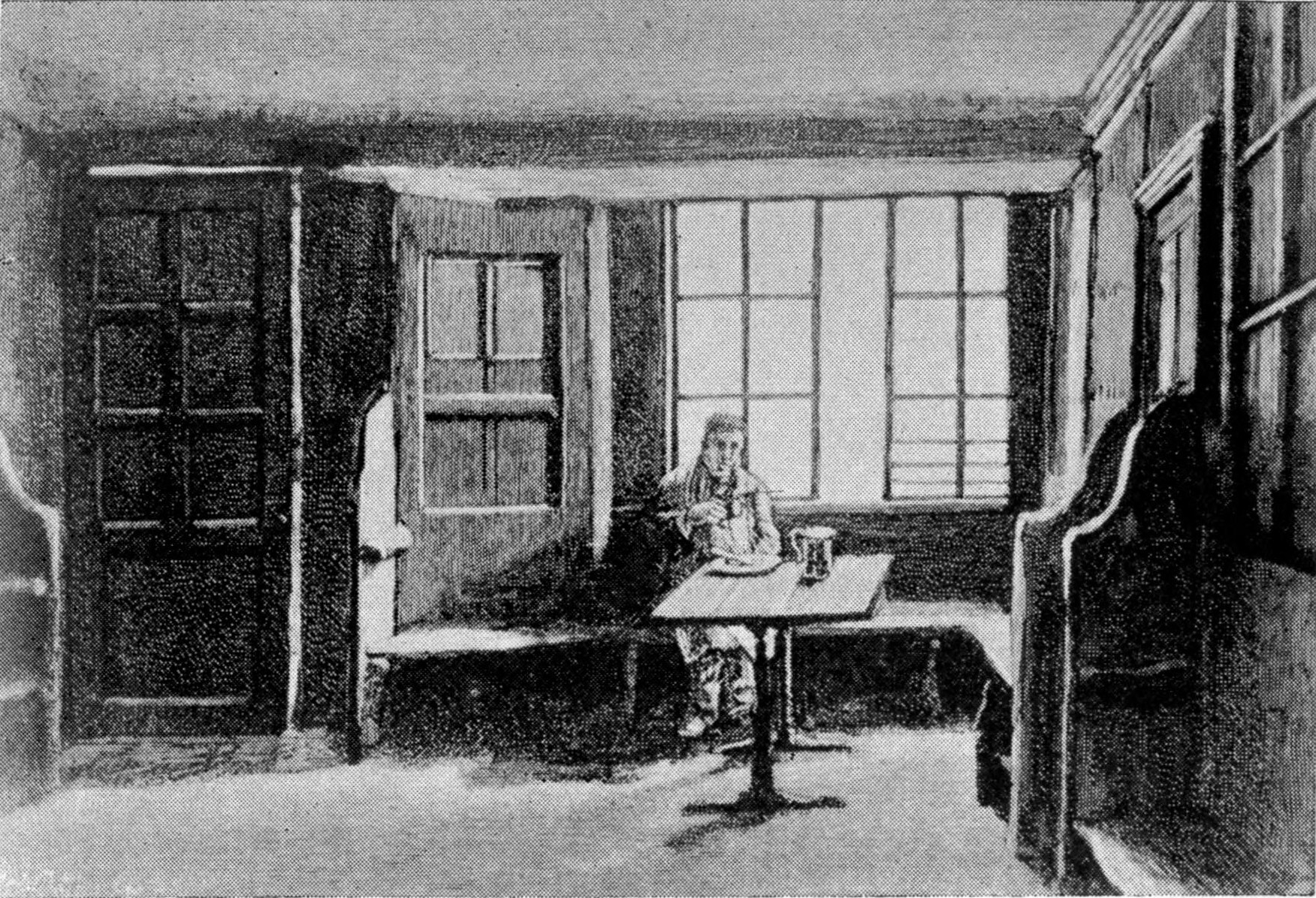
Tap room

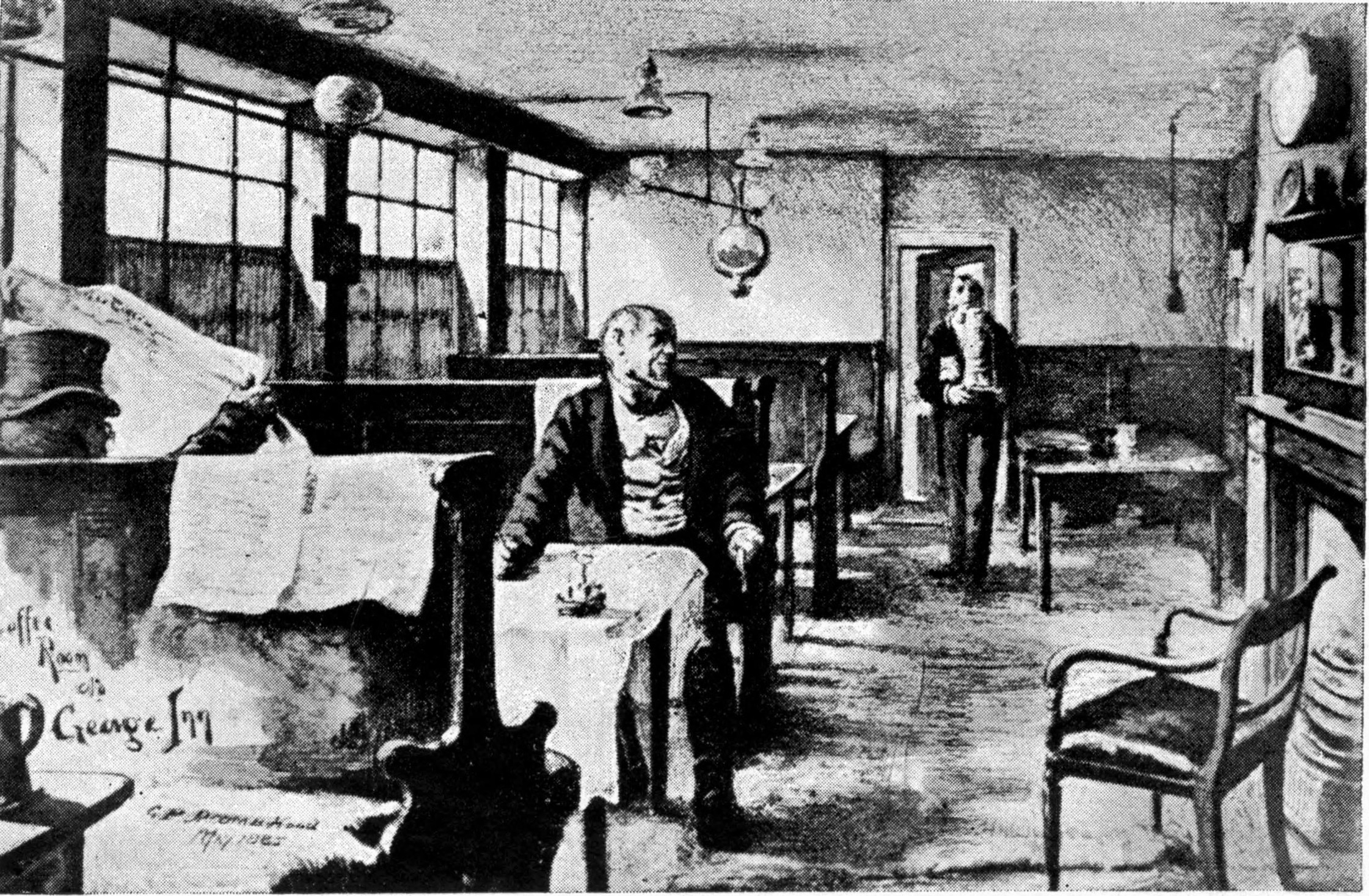
Coffee-room

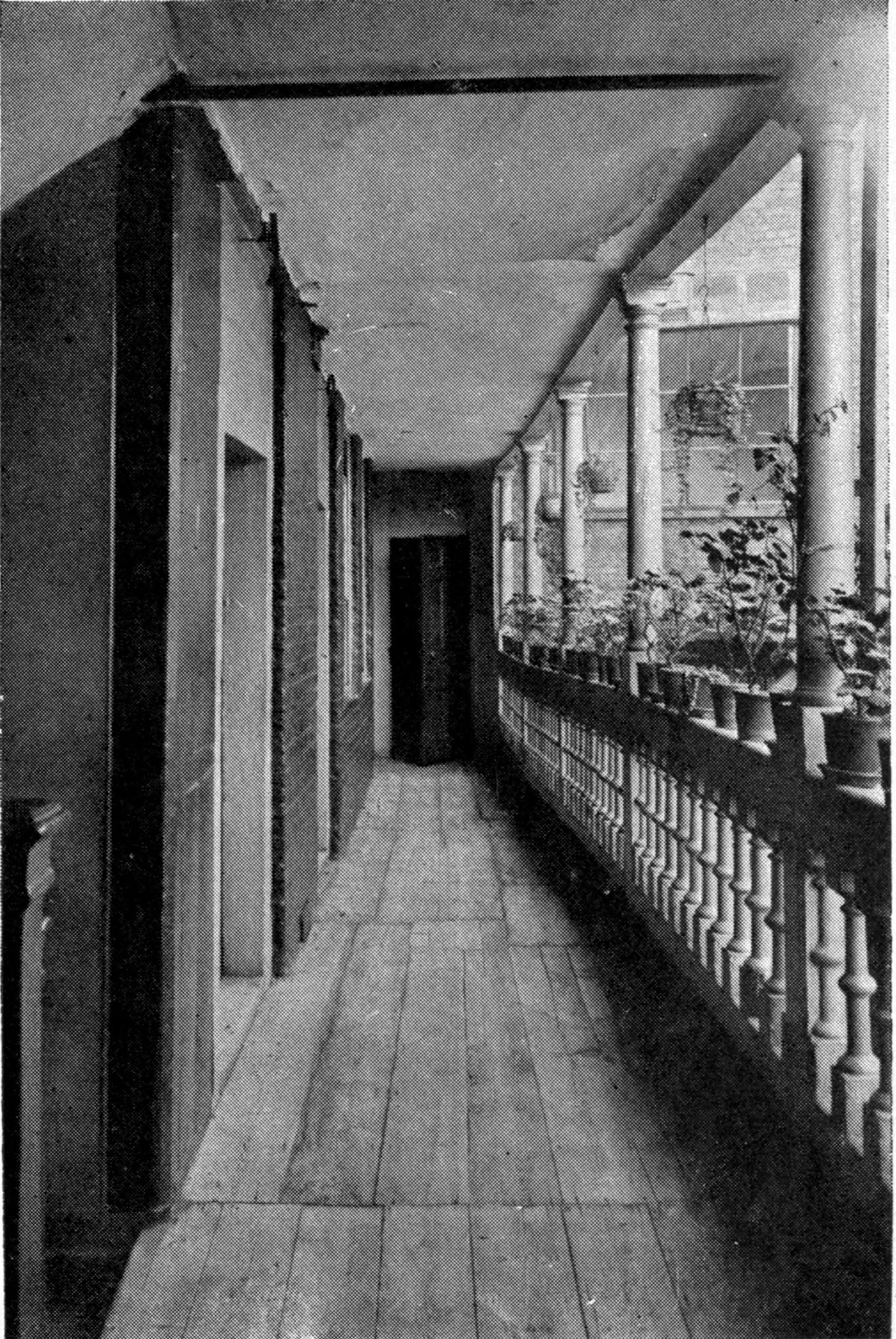
First-floor gallery

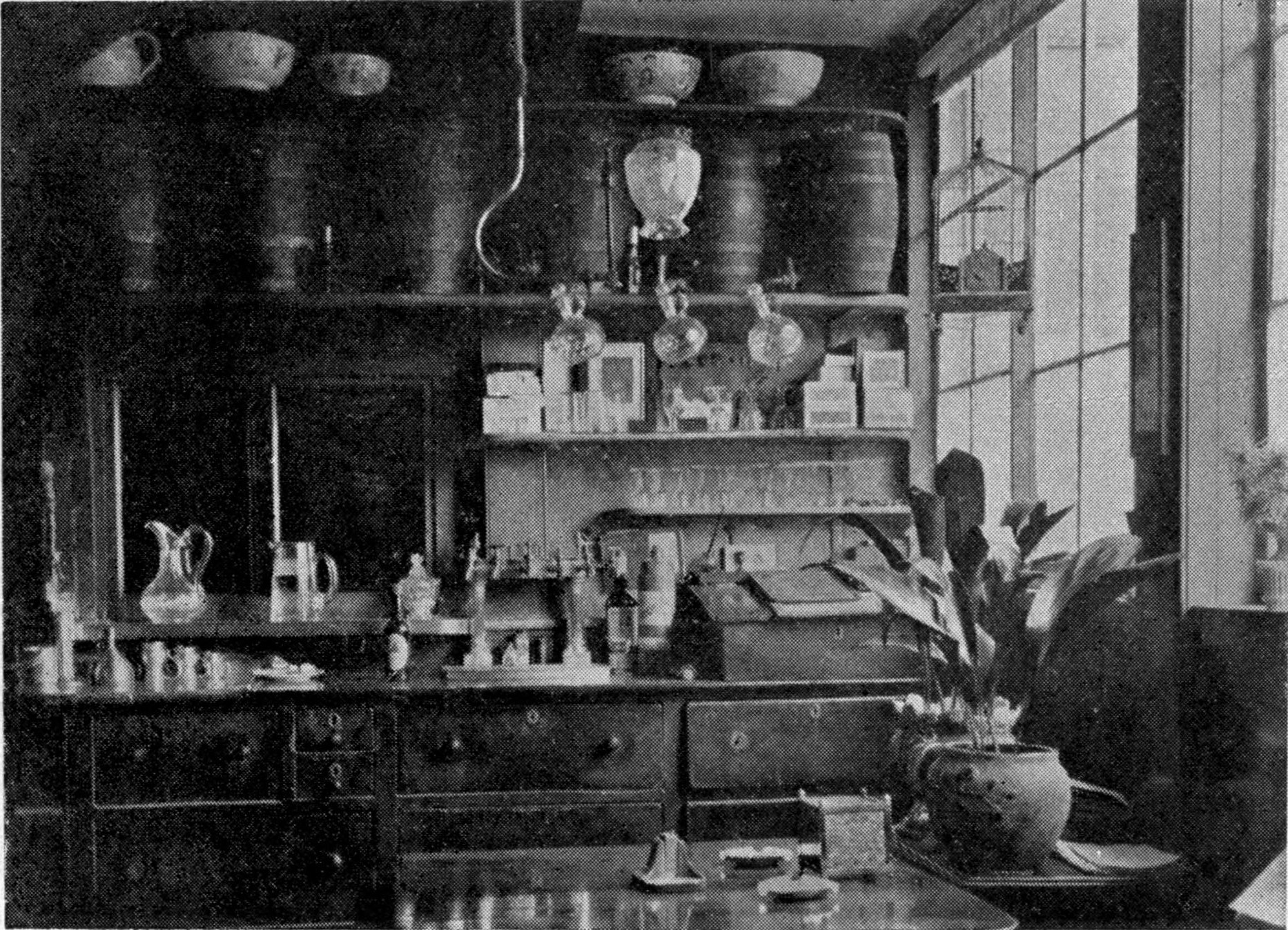
Bar parlour

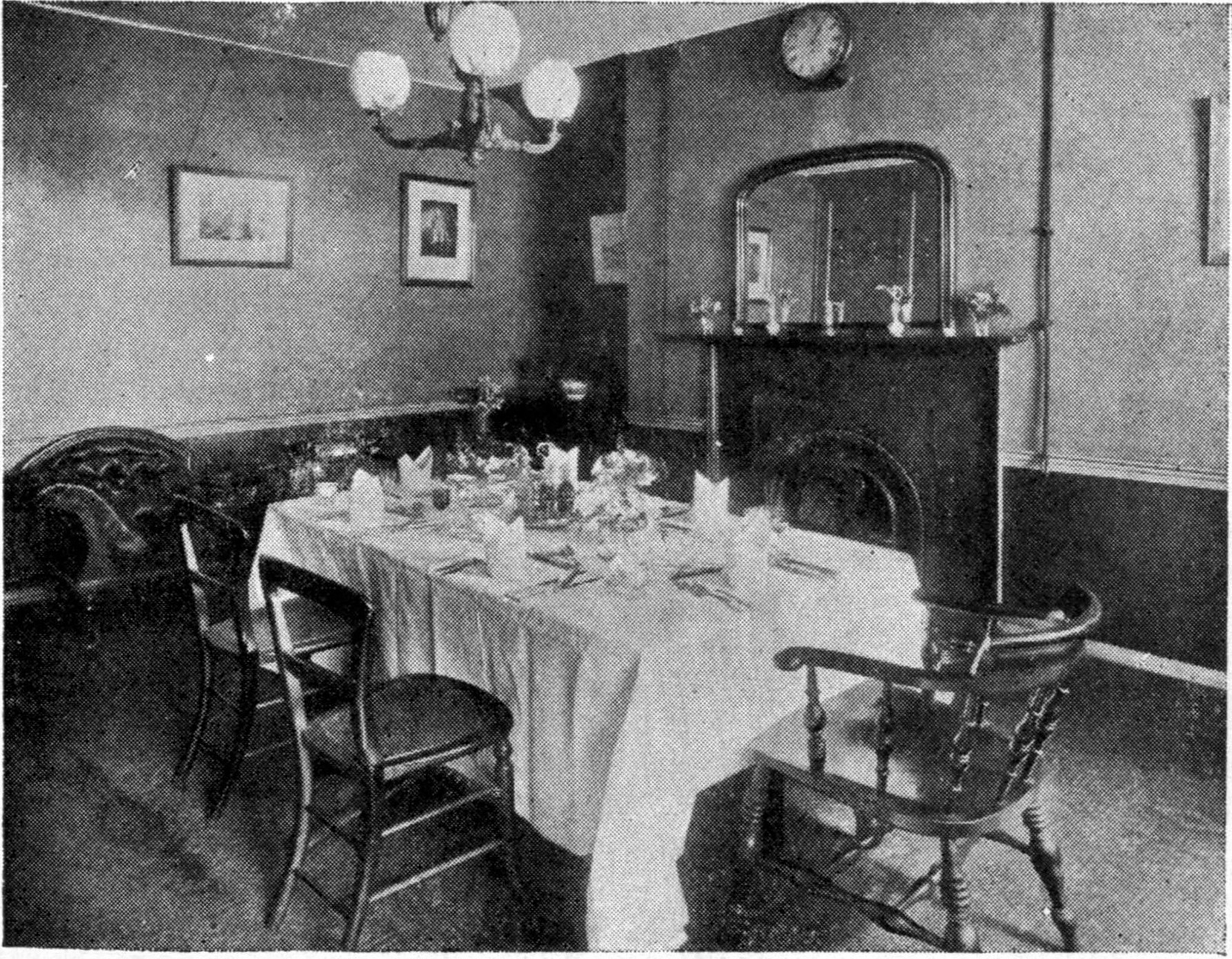
Dining room

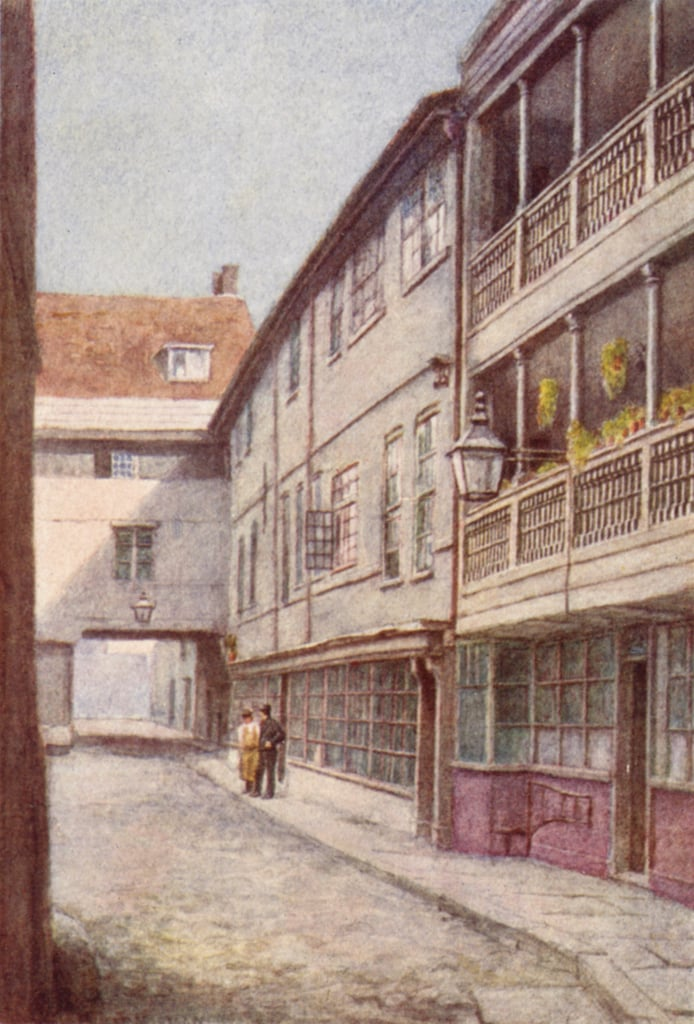
George Inn, Southwark, 1885 by Philip Norman

== See also ==
- Grade I listed buildings in the London Borough of Southwark
- List of pubs in London
- The George Inn, Norton St Philip, another coaching inn with a galleried courtyard
