= Half Moon, Herne Hill =

Listed pub in London, England

Half Moon
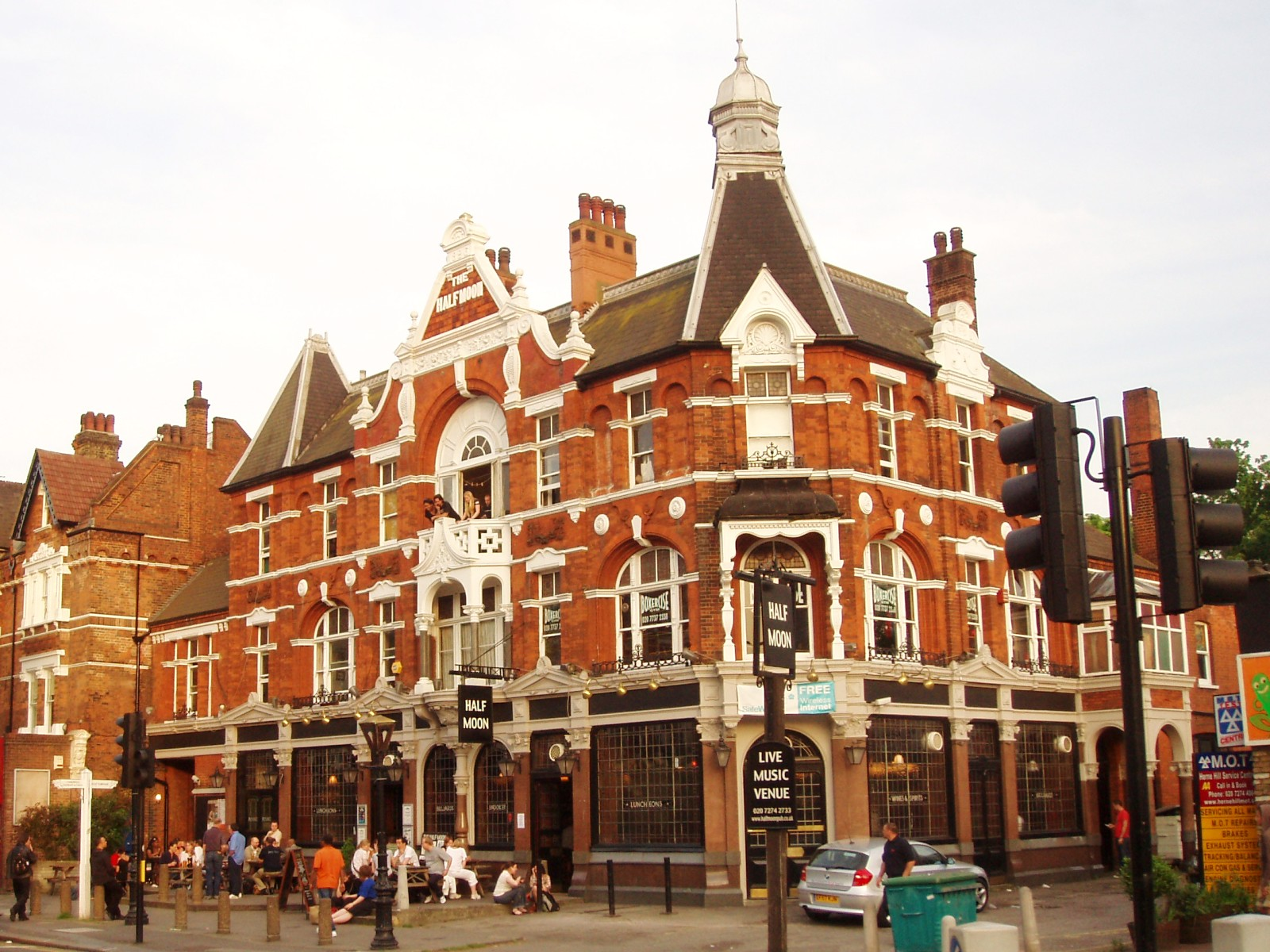
- The pub in 2008

General information
- Type: Public house
- Architectural style: Jacobethan Revival
- Location: 10 Half Moon Lane, Herne Hill, London, England
- Coordinates: 51.4526°N 0.1006°W
- Year built: 1896; 130 years ago
- Owner: Fuller, Smith & Turner

Design and construction
- Designations

Listed Building – Grade II*
- Official name: Half Moon public house
- Designated: 17 September 1998
- Reference no.: 1385592

Website
- halfmoonhernehill.co.uk

The Half Moon is a Grade II* listed public house on Half Moon Lane in Herne Hill, London, England. It is included on the Campaign for Real Ale (CAMRA)'s National Inventory of Historic Pub Interiors and was frequented by the poet and writer Dylan Thomas. For nearly 50 years, it operated as a notable live music venue, hosting three performances by U2 in 1980. In 2015, the Half Moon was designated an asset of community value by Southwark Council. It is described by Nikolaus Pevsner as "a cheerful corner pub of 1896".

== History ==
An inn has stood on the site at the west end of Half Moon Lane, nearest Herne Hill, since the middle of the 17th century, but the first public house "known by the Sign of the Half Moon" was built by Joseph Miller in 1760.

A letter to the Editor of the Monthly Magazine in March 1808, records the death of a boy chimney sweep at the Half Moon on 12 February of that same year, having been taken in suffering from fatigue and cold on "Dulwich Lane", after a great quantity of snow fell.

In 1844, Edward Alleyn's original tombstone, removed many years before from the College of God's Gift Chapel, was 're-discovered' in the skittle ground of the Half Moon, where it was believed to be serving as a cover or break-water for a parish sewer. It is said that the tombstone had "doubtless proved advantageous to the landlord in drawing visitors to his house." One contemporary source states that "Mr. Webb, of the Half Moon Inn, Dulwich, presented the college with the original gravestone of Edward Alleyn, which for many years had been preserved by himself and father in the tea gardens at the rear of the inn."

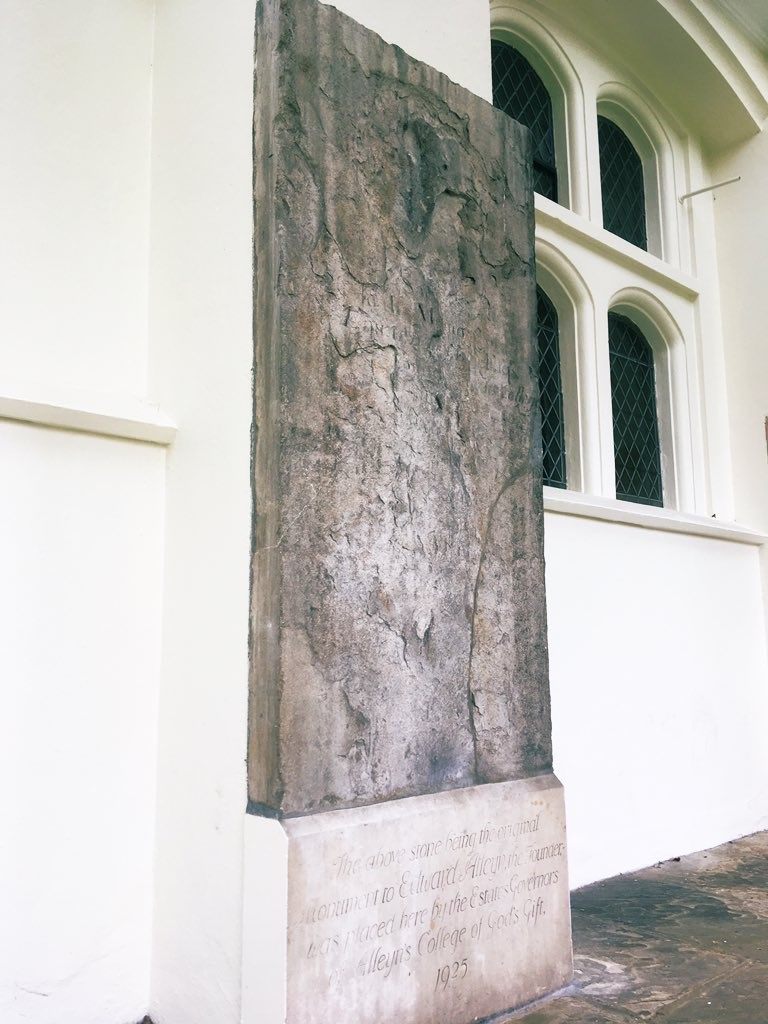
Photo of Edward Alleyn memorial stone outside the Christ's Chapel of God's Gift, Dulwich, UK.

John Webb is shown to be the tenant of the Half Moon Public House, stable and paddock for 22 years from 1824. John Webb of the Half Moon public house, Dulwich is also shown in Old Bailey records from 1833, providing a reference of good character for a prisoner named William Patten, aged 22, who was found guilty of stealing two live pigs and sentenced to be "Transported for Seven Years".

The Census return for 1851 shows that Mr. Webb the proprietor of the Half Moon employed five staff. In 1853, William John Webb, is shown as giving evidence in the Old Bailey in the case of Daniel Allen, aged 32, feloniously uttering a forged ten shilling Bank of England note, with intent to defraud. He states in his evidence, "I keep the Half-moon, at Dulwich. On Sunday, 7th Nov., between 3 and 4 o'clock in the afternoon, I was in my bar; the prisoner came in and asked me if I could change a 10/. note for Mrs. Goulding—I told him I could—he had a glass of ale and a cigar, and then left—I paid the note into the Excise-office next day (Monday), and on the following Saturday it was returned to me stamped "Forged"—I had not known the prisoner before—this was on a Sunday—people dress differently on a Sunday in my neighbourhood." The prisoner was found guilty and "Transported for Ten Years".

The Half Moon is recorded as being up for sale in April 1868, where it is described as having been in the hands of the Webb family for, "the best part of a century". The pub at this time is said to have four rooms on the top floor; assembly room and six other rooms on the first floor; bar and six rooms on the ground floor, and large tea garden. It is said to be held from Dulwich College for twenty-eight years unexpired, at £95 per annum, and £1 in lieu of land tax. A range of stabling is also underlet at £32 per annum.

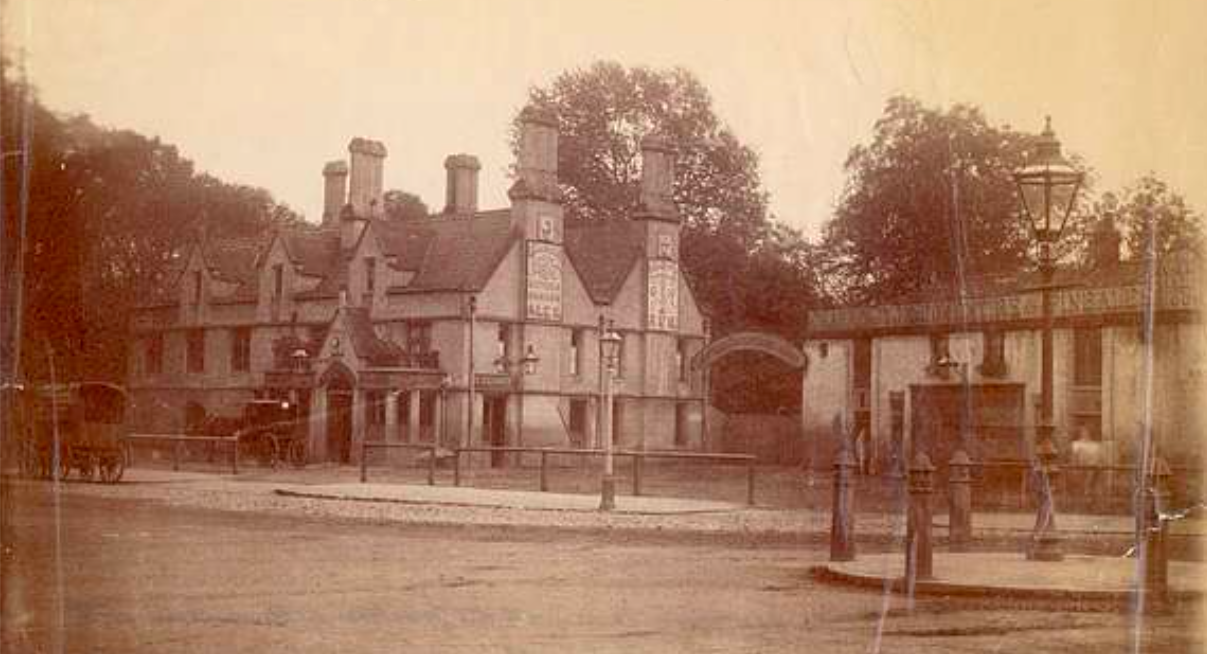
The Half Moon Tavern, 1880

In 1878, the area of Dulwich is described as being "a favourite resort for the working men of London, for the purpose of holding their annual gatherings at one or other of its taverns, the chief of which are the "Greyhound," the "Half Moon," and the "Crown."" At this time, the Half Moon was particularly noted for its flower garden, lawns and tea gardens. A newspaper report in April of the same year, records the story of a smartly dressed gentleman asking the stableman at the Half Moon to clean his shoes, and the stableman receiving the princely payment of a half sovereign in return. While cleaning the shoes, the gentleman told the stableman that he had just lost £1,800 on the Grand National, and was later seen in the act of committing suicide on the track near Herne Hill railway station.

19th century English author, poet and artist John Ruskin refers to walking "between the hostelry of the Half-moon at the bottom of Herne Hill, and the secluded college of Dulwich". Stanfords' 1864 map shows a tributary of the River Effra flowing north towards Half Moon Lane and running along it, past the Half Moon pub, to Herne Hill. Before the river was covered over in this area in 19th century, John Ruskin describes this tributary as a "tadpole-haunted ditch". During this period, the Half Moon Tavern was accessed by crossing a bridge over the Effra, which appears in an early sketch from 1810.

The rural nature of the Half Moon's environs in the early part of the 19th century, is demonstrated by the fact that in 1805, during the Napoleonic Wars, army manoeuvres took place in Dulwich, with troops stationed on the village green in Half Moon Lane and at the cross roads by the Half Moon Public House. The Half Moon is also mentioned as being the location of a strategic "line of defence" in William Le Queux's fictional account of an invasion led by France and Russia, The Great War in England in 1897, published in 1895.

Between 1894 and 1896, the old Half Moon was rebuilt as a hotel by architect James William Brooker in Jacobethan Revival style. Brooker lived locally in East Dulwich. The size of the new hotel and richness of its fittings is partly explained by its location near the terminus of one of the horse-drawn omnibus services into London. The demolition of the former Half Moon Tavern by its owners The Dulwich Estate was clearly not universally popular at the time, with a subsequent poem appearing in Punch entitled "The Doom of Dulwich", including the lines, "Alas for the famous old inns! Ah! progress is all very well, But one of its shockingest sins, Is ringing antiquity's knell. The "Crown" and the "Half Moon" are gone, And now they the Greyhound attack." Writing in May 1896, Alfred Allison, describes the new development, "The picturesque old Half Moon at Herne Hill, with its low ceilings and quaint gables, was recently given over to the wreckers. Not a brick or a plank remains. In its place has grown up a gigantic modern structure quite in keeping with the new surroundings."

In August 1898, the International Brewers' Journal reported that the new owner of the Half Moon, Thomas Cason, appeared in court claiming that he was induced by misrepresentation as to the takings of the public house when entering into a contract of purchase to buy it for the agreed sum of £64,000 in 1897. After appointing a manager, Mr. Davis, of considerable experience, he stated that he found that he could not take anything like the figures that had been represented to him. The jury without retiring returned a verdict for the defendant, Mr. Wm. Arthur Hine, who gave evidence that the plaintiff had nearly given up the cheap dinners to workmen, had changed the staff, and removed a Freemasons' Lodge from the house. Judgment was entered accordingly with costs.

In December 1899, social reformer Charles Booth noted that the Half Moon pub had sold "a year or so ago" for £64,000. This was a huge sum considering that houses in neighbouring Stradella Road cost less than £1,000 at this time. He adds that "Jones does not think it can pay". The 'Jones' referred to is undoubtedly the local Police Constable Jones, with whom Booth went walking the area. Booth describes the Half Moon pub in his 1899 notes as "an elaborate, florid, large, newly decorated public house".

In September 1907, a barman named Joseph Kemp, going upstairs to his bedroom at the Half Moon Public House, fell over the banisters, and died from his injuries a few seconds after being picked up. In 1908, Edith Smith, barmaid at the Half Moon Hotel, Herne Hill, gives evidence at the Old Bailey in a case of counterfeit coinage stating, "The "Half Moon" is a large house and was rebuilt some years ago. There are six bars ... the front bar, or public bar ... is quite open and there are no screens round it." She states that the pub is never busy in the afternoon, that she usually serves in the saloon bar, and that "a glass of ale and a screw of tobacco" costs two pence. The pub at this time is also described as having a cash register.

In 1921, Brixton Chess Club began convening in the Half Moon, and the club marked the change of venue by inviting the famous Russian chess player Eugene Znosko-Borovsky to give a simultaneous exhibition (simul) there on Thursday 21 April.

In June 1930, police from all the surrounding stations were rushed by motor tenders to the Half Moon Hotel to help quell a disturbance involving 500 fighting Irishmen. The resulting police action involved baton charges, and seven arrests were made. The incident took place on Whit Monday, and involved fighting between rival supporters of Dublin and Cork hurling teams, who played each other at Herne Hill Velodrome. In the subsequent court case, Lambeth magistrates heard evidence from Detective-Sergeant Moyer, who said that when he arrived on the scene he saw a small body of police with their backs to the wall and truncheons drawn, surrounded by a mob of 500 hooligans. Tumblers were used as missiles, it was stated, and 200 glasses were broken.

On 4 March 1935, shortly after shortly after the discovery of a burglary at the Half Moon Hotel, the landlord, William Nye Songhurst, died suddenly from shock. He was aged 47 years, and is reported to have suffered with a bad heart.

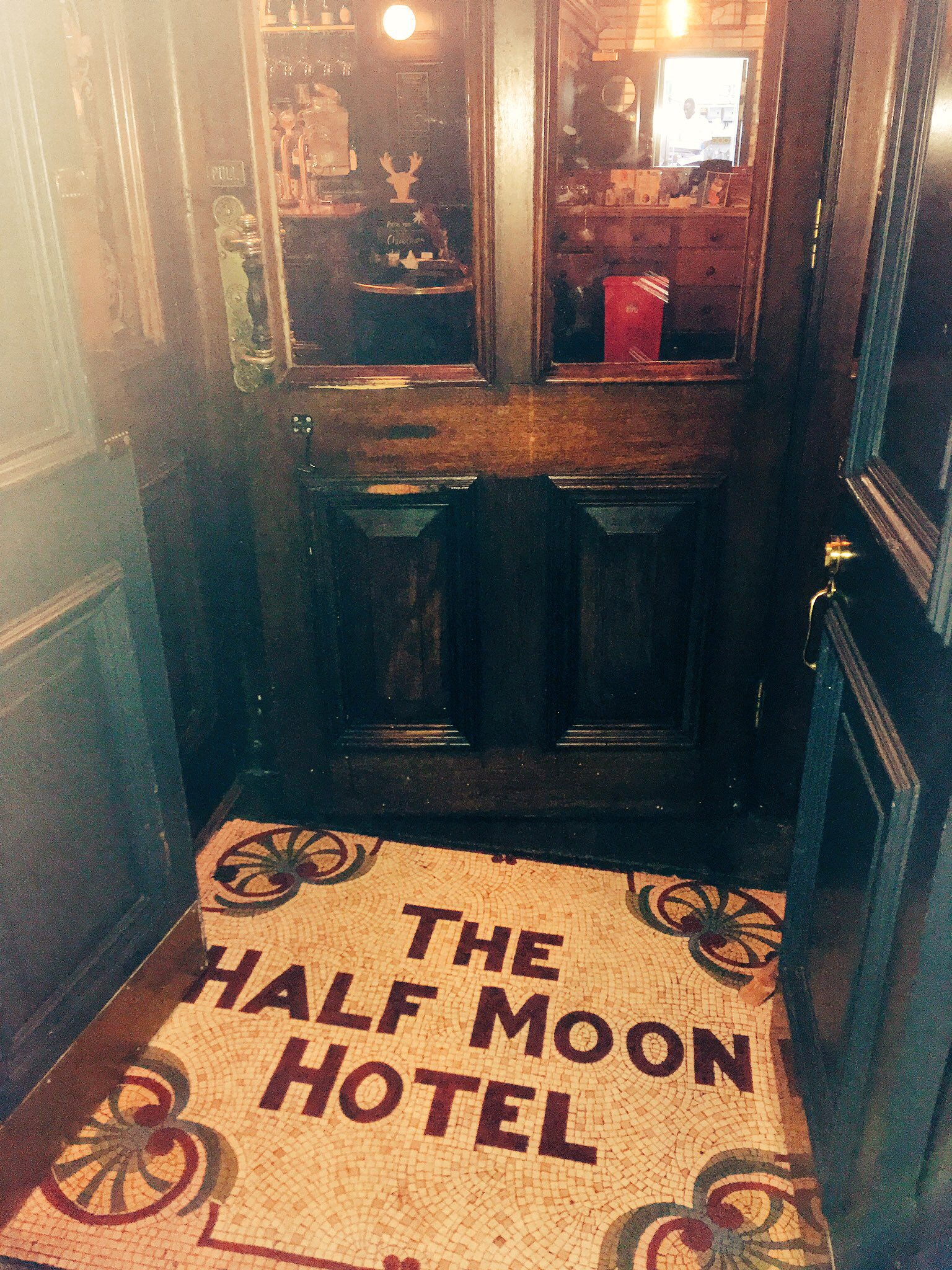
Photo of the tiled entrance to the Half Moon Hotel in Herne Hill, London.

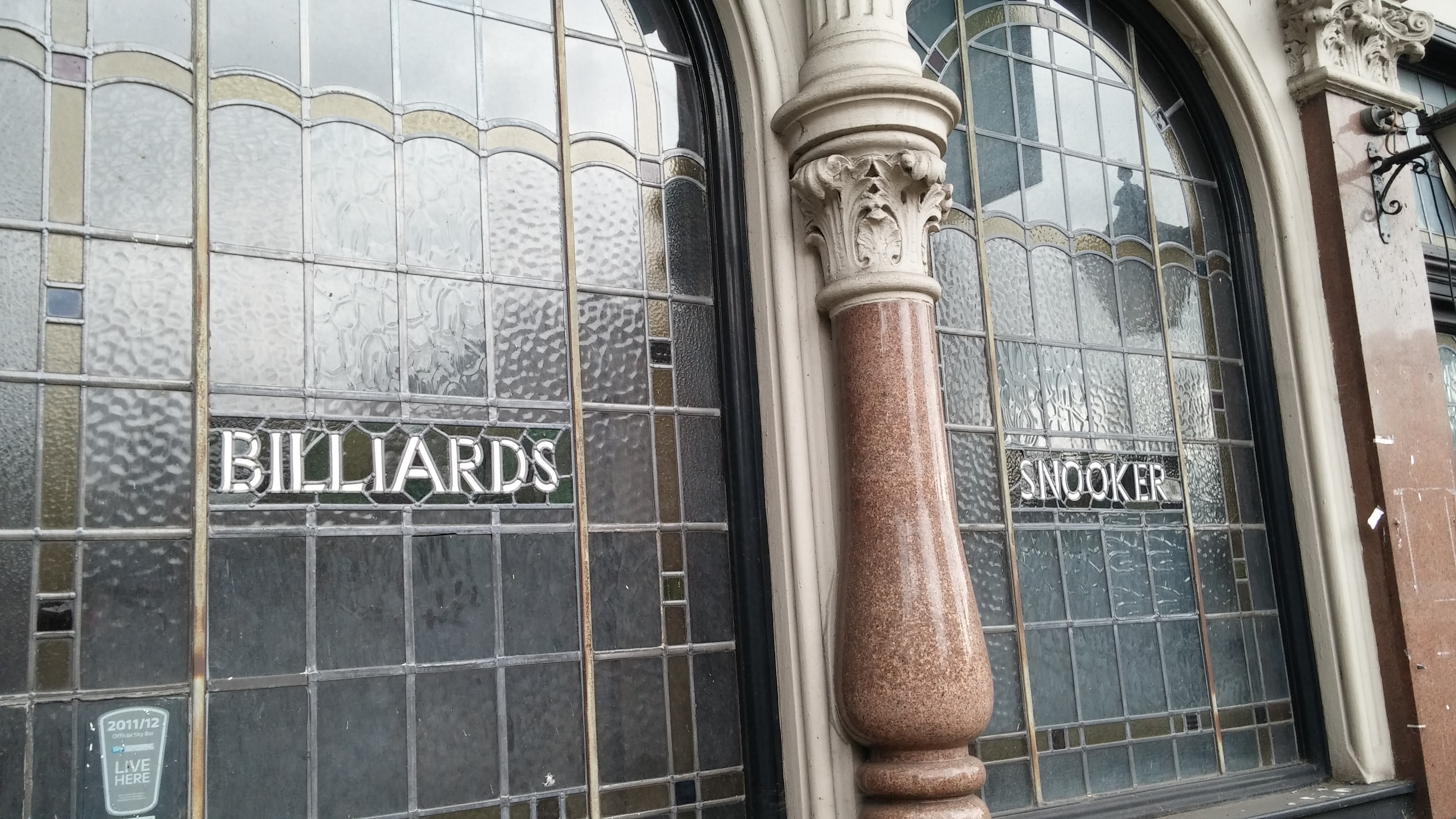
The stained glass windows of the Half Moon Pub in Herne Hill still advertise its previous activities.

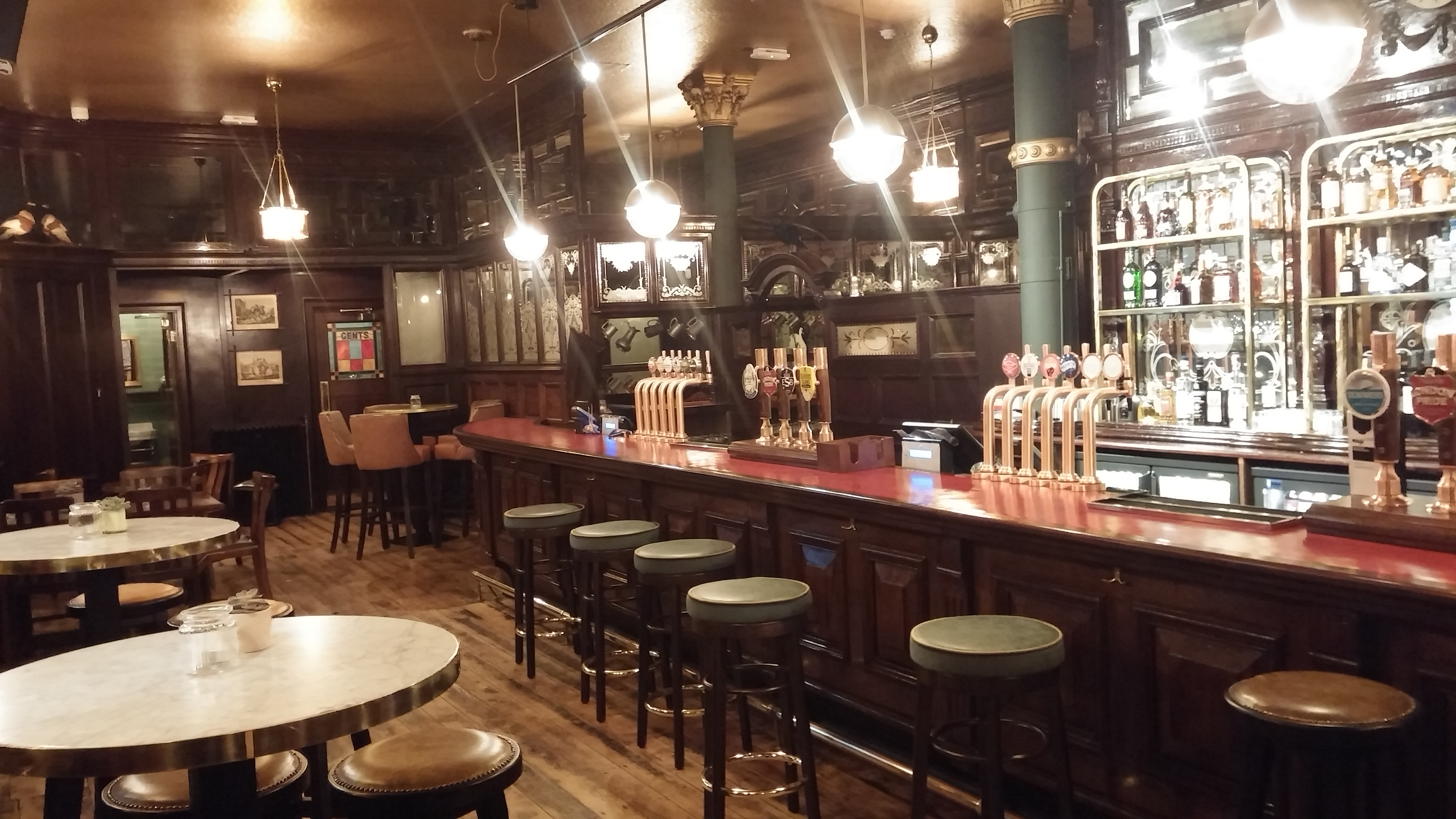
Inside the Half Moon, Herne Hill

The Historic England listing for the Half Moon Public House states that, "The proliferation of ornament across the surface of this building gives the whole a sense of vital unity through their sheer number." The Half Moon is also listed by CAMRA as, "A pub with a nationally important historic interior." Only 270 pubs meet CAMRA's exacting criteria and the Half Moon is one of them. The snug bar (referred to as a "Billiard Room" in CAMRA's 1988 South East London Pub Guide) contains six back-painted mirrors depicting birds and signed by the renowned 'W. Gibbs & Sons glass decorators' of Blackfriars. The pub is also noteworthy for the rare survival of joinery and associated fabric at the public bar. The large, uncompartmented public bar at the Half Moon is a typical feature of pubs built during the 1890s pub boom. Photos of the pub from the first part of the 20th century, show it to be operated by the Southwark-based brewery Barclay Perkins & Co.

The original entrance to the 'Hotel', is indicated by a portico, supported by columns, jutting out from the right-hand side of the pub. The Victorian mosaic tilework at this entrance mark out the words "The Half Moon Hotel". The rear of the Half Moon comprises both an original element forming a billiards room, and a later addition constructed during the 1930s to convert this area into a snooker room. These two activities are still advertised in the stained glasswork on the outside of the pub.

The poet and writer Dylan Thomas lived locally on Milkwood Road and used to drink at The Half Moon. Writer A.F. Churchward-Tinsley, writing in a Welsh magazine in 1959, first drew the connection between Dylan Thomas and the Half Moon. He interviewed Dylan's friend, sculptor and London Welsh rugby player, Evan Samuel, who recounts how, "Dylan used to come to watch the London Welsh games, and when, after the match, the teams would gather, as rugger clubs do, for a few pints at the old Half Moon Hotel at Herne Hill, Dylan would be there adding lustre to the gathering. He was a great conversationalist".

London Welsh Rugby Football Club had their home at the nearby Herne Hill Velodrome for over 40 years after World War I, where "alcohol was not permitted by the Dulwich College landlords". The club adopted the Half Moon pub, with player Vivian Jenkins recalling, "If I had been given a fiver for every time I sang Sospan Fach or Calon Lan at the old 'Half Moon' near Herne Hill Station in my playing days in the thirties I should be a millionaire!"

On 5 May 1969, The Daily Mirror reported the story of builder Alec Graham, 40, who got into a fight with a drinking pal just before closing time at the Half Moon, which resulted in his ear being entirely severed. Alec's ear was handed to him by the pub landlord, Bert Hyland, whereupon he groaned, "I don't want it", before popping it into a dustbin. Alec later went to hospital to be treated, his ear was retrieved after doctors called for a police search, and successfully sewn back on. The landlord, Bert Hyland, was a former champion boxer, who won the Irish Middleweight title in June 1949. "It wasn't a serious fight" said Mr. Hyland, "Alec put the lock on this chap, who reached up and tore off his ear. I picked it up and handed it to Alec and told him to get it sewn back on". Alec is reported as saying afterwards, "I feel a bit groggy. Now I just want to forget about it. I've shaken hands with my friend".

During the tenancy of Robert Harrison (2006-2013), listed building consent was granted in 2007 for the formation of a new opening in the existing tongue and groove boarding adjacent to the existing decorative glazed screen between the front Public Bar and Saloon Bar.

== Music venue ==
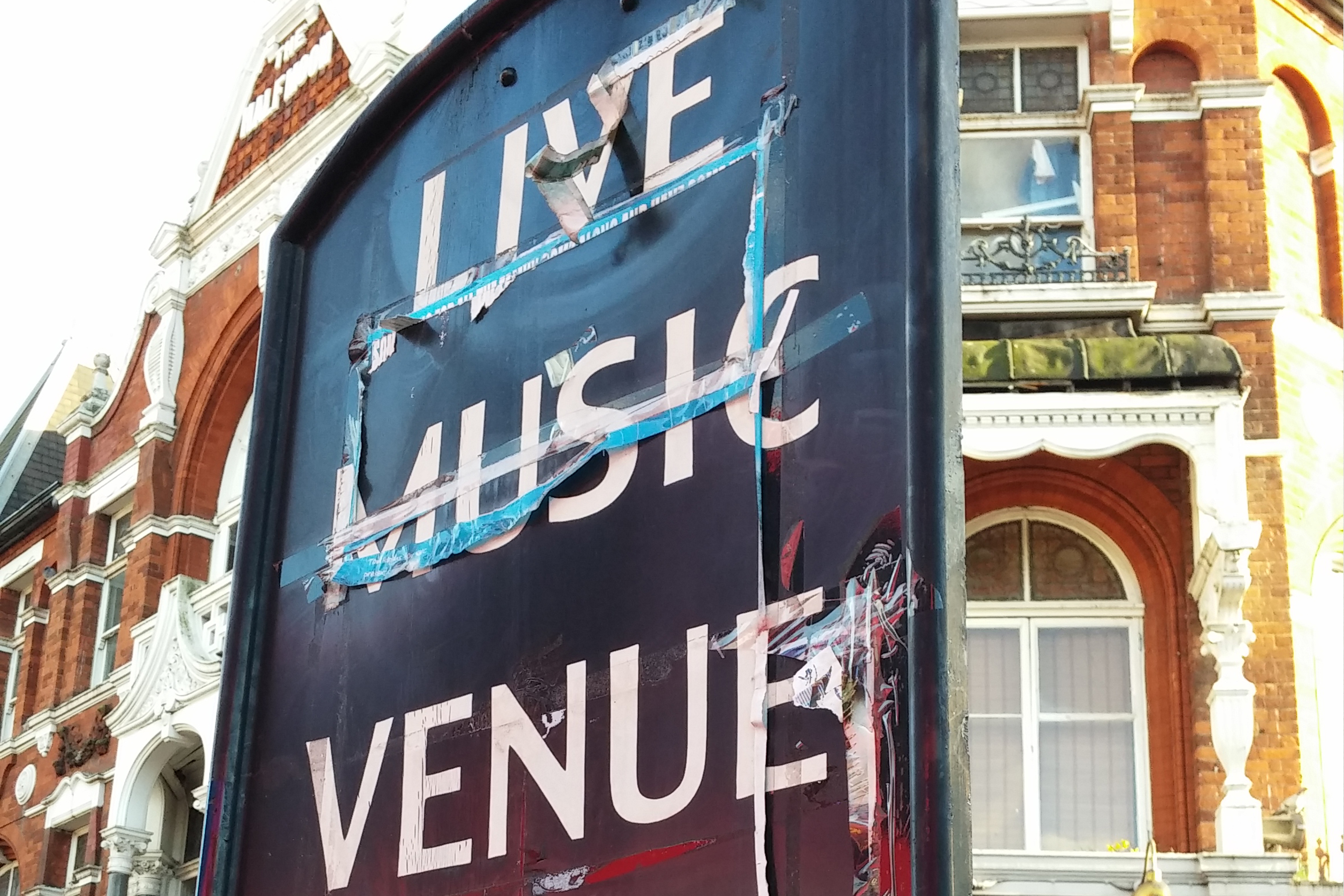
Live Music Venue Sign – Half Moon, Herne Hill

The Half Moon was a live music venue for nearly 50 years, with bands having appeared early in their careers including The Police, Van Morrison and U2. Locals still refer to an impromptu Half Moon performance by Frank Sinatra, who dropped by to visit his old chauffeur. A press photo of Sinatra's ex-wife Mia Farrow meeting her former chauffeur Dennis Parker, on his first night as landlord of the Half Moon at Herne Hill, would also appear to substantiate this connection, and subsequently date any Sinatra visit to the pub to the 1970s. Farrow is recorded as having stayed in the Half Moon for twenty minutes. Sinatra is said to have introduced Dennis Parker to everyone as "my friend Dennis".

In the early to mid 1960s, The Half Moon hosted one of the premier folk clubs in South London, drawing large numbers of people every Tuesday night. The club was run by Ed Parslow and Charles Pearce, both of whom were students at the Camberwell College of Arts. Pearce was the floor singer and guests included Dave and Toni Arthur, Bert Jansch, Cliff Aungier, Gerry Lockran, Diz Disley, Pete and Marian Gray, The Hickory Nuts, and The Bruce Turner Jump Band.

The Half Moon was a significant South London venue on the 1970s pub rock circuit, hosting performances by Dr. Feelgood, Meal Ticket, Nine Below Zero, and Eddie and the Hot Rods. Around 1974, local musician Stevie Smith started the Sunday jam sessions at the Half Moon. These sessions featured other Herne Hill musicians such as Steve Waller and Brendan Hoban, alongside an array of musical talent from contemporary bands, including The Jeff Beck Group, the Rory Gallagher band, and Thin Lizzy. Steve Waller went on to join Manfred Mann's Earth Band after Manfred Mann was, "recommended to check out a popular South London circuit musician – a singer and guitarist – at the Half Moon pub, Herne Hill." A barmaid at the Half Moon recalls that Steve Waller always ordered a 'triple gin and bitter lemon' at the Sunday lunchtime jam session. Two videos featuring a live set of Steve Waller's Overload from the summer of 1990 in the Half Moon exist.

The Half Moon in Herne Hill also has a notable place in rock history as being the venue where Chris Blackwell, the founder of Island Records, first met the members of U2 and watched them perform. Island Records public-relations chief Rob Partridge described the encounter: "It just so happened that U2 were playing at the Half Moon in Herne Hill, a gig they'd repeatedly played through the course of coming to London. Chris had never seen the band and so went from the Bob (Marley) gig to Herne Hill and met up with the band. The dressing room is like a front room, and I just remember him taking an immediate delight in the band because they are bright, articulate, funny, all those kind of things."

Writing in his 2022 memoir, Chris Blackwell says: "I went off to see U2 with my girlfriend at the time, Nathalie Delon, and one or two others. I did not know it, but I was heading into another adventure. Arriving at the pub, an old haunt of Dylan Thomas’s, I would never have believed I was about to come across Island’s next big signing. There seemed to be more people in my entourage than in the paying audience, but U2 played as though there were a thousand in front of them. They were bursting out of themselves. I was immediately blown away by their passion. I didn’t really feel the music – it wasn’t my kind of thing, too trebly, a bit rinky-dinky. Bono talks about how when I came to the gig I was dressed in shorts and flip-flops, as if it were a cold winter’s day or something. It was June, but Bono likes to make a story better."

Chris Blackwell describes the 8 June 1980 gig as having, "probably 12 people in the audience." However, by their return gig at the Half Moon on 11 July 1980, U2 marked a milestone, as it was the first time they'd sold out a concert venue in the UK. A review of the gig by Bill Graham for Hot Press states, "for the encore Bono leaps off the stage to serenade the audience from the raised enclosure where the mixing desk and us flunkies are located." Producer Steve Lillywhite is also recorded as being present at this show. Not everyone was impressed. Comedian Vic Reeves states that, "I saw U2 there. I wasn't impressed – they looked like they wanted to be punks but they weren't. Bono's haircut was atrocious." Music writer, Michael Odell, recalls a conversation with Bono backstage at Madison Square Garden, where he mentions that he lives near to the Half Moon in Herne Hill where U2 played, but in answer to Bono's question, "Were you there?" has to admit that he didn't see them play. U2 played one further time at the Half Moon on the opening leg of their tour to promote their album Boy on 5 October 1980. Photos of U2 at Half Moon feature in a photozine by Andy Phillips, documenting the band's first and earliest visits to the UK in 1980. A drawing of Bono's 1980 haircut, rendered in stainless steel by the artist Caroline McCarthy, now adorns the inside of the pub.

The Half Moon was the venue where The Alarm announced their new name to the world in January 1981, and performed a second gig in May 1982. It also hosted the first ever gig by Then Jerico in 1983, and the first gig by Gavin Rossdale of Bush.

The era of New wave music in the early 1980s was a particularly rich period in the Half Moon's music history, with a succession of bands and performers including The Stray Cats, The Comsat Angels, The Triffids, The Sound, The Go-Betweens, The Chameleons, Jason and the Scorchers, and Billy Bragg all appearing. The Billy Bragg gig on 12 December 1983 was reviewed in both Sounds and Melody Maker, "Pity (Billy Bragg's) doting followers, who arrived in their buzzing droves, didn't have the decency to stay for the main act."

Writing in The Guardian in 1981, Robin Denselow states, "The Half Moon, Herne Hill, South London, is established as a testing ground for bands who often move on to greater things." The Half Moon was also a venue for more well-known acts going back to their roots, hosting gigs by Steve Marriott in 1984, and Grammy Award winner Albert Lee in 1990. In 1998, "The Bard of Salford" John Cooper Clarke performed at the Half Moon.

In 2003, punk rock band The Parkinsons played the pub. More recent acts at the Half Moon during the tenancy of Robert Harrison from 2006 to 2013, include Paloma Faith, Kae Tempest (with their band Sound of Rum in 2009), Rumer, The Beat, The Handsome Family, The Wonderstuff, The Coal Porters, Wilko Johnson, and Turin Brakes. Chris Sievey's comic persona Frank Sidebottom appeared onstage in June 2007. The musician and founder of 2 Tone Records, Jerry Dammers, also used the Half Moon as a rehearsal space during this time. The beginning of the pub's relationship with 2 Tone Records dates back to the early 1980s, when bands from the label, such as The Swinging Cats and The Higsons played there.

A poster for Clinic's show at the Half Moon in 2010, appears in the book "Classic Rock Posters – Sixty Years of Posters and Flyers: 1952 to 2012". At the same 'secret show', support act Anna Calvi is said to have blown Clinic off the stage. Grammy Award winner La Roux launched her singing career at the pub when she was 17, after being encouraged by her parents to perform at an open mic night. She recalls, "I spent a couple of years going to my local pub in Herne Hill doing open mic nights there." The pub is also particularly renowned as a long-standing venue for live blues music. DJ Food was the last act to perform at the Half Moon before it was closed due to a flood in 2013.

== Comedy venue ==
As well as music, the Half Moon has hosted regular comedy, with acts including Mark Lamarr, Eddie Izzard and Omid Djalili. Comedian Jo Brand said, "I have lived in this area since 1978 and in Herne Hill for a few years as a student nurse. The Half Moon was always the centre of the universe for us, and when I started doing stand-up comedy, I performed there a few times."

== Theatre venue ==
The pub has also been a regular venue for theatre, and is listed in the London Theatre Report published in 2014. The play Botallack O'Clock premiered at the Half Moon in 2011, before transferring to the Edinburgh Festival in 2012, and New York City in 2013. The Inbetweeners Movie actress Lydia Rose Bewley performed in theatre productions at the pub in 2010. The Half Moon has also been a venue for Rollapaluza cycling.

== Boxing gym ==
There has also been a boxing gym upstairs at the Half Moon. Danny Williams, who knocked out Mike Tyson in 2004, and went on to fight for the WBC heavyweight title, trained here as a child. The boxing gym was run for a number years by former British and European light welterweight champion Clinton McKenzie. The charity London Community Boxing (LCB) was founded by people who met at the Half Moon gym.

== Depictions ==
English writer and poet Richard Church recalls stopping for lunch at The Half Moon Tavern to "rest the horses", when moving home from Battersea to Herne Hill as a child in Edwardian era London. "I sat on the tailboard, and the foreman treated me to a ginger beer and a meat pie."

In 1988, the public bar of the Half Moon featured in an advert for Red Rock Cider, directed by John Lloyd and starring Leslie Nielsen.

The Half Moon is depicted in the graphic novel, From Hell, by Alan Moore and Eddie Campbell.

In 2007, as part of the "Disappearing London" documentary television series that was broadcast on ITV London, Madness frontman Suggs visited the Half Moon to interview boxer Clinton McKenzie in his boxing gym above the pub.

In April 2008, comedian Ronnie Corbett was interviewed with TV presenters Ant and Dec in the Half Moon for The Observer.

Scenes from the 2011 British movie Treacle Jr., directed by Jamie Thraves and starring Aidan Gillen, were filmed in the Half Moon.

== Recent history ==
The pub was flooded in August 2013, and was subsequently closed for a number of years. In 2014, The Dulwich Estate put forward proposals for the conversion of the upper floors of the Half Moon into five self-contained flats and a mews house at the rear, but these plans were subsequently withdrawn following pre-application planning advice received from Southwark Council. In December 2015, the pub was awarded asset of community value (ACV) status by Southwark Council. The ACV status of the Half Moon was upheld by Southwark Council in April 2016, following an appeal by The Dulwich Estate against the listing. In January 2016, London's Fuller's Brewery acquired the lease from the freeholder, The Dulwich Estate. The pub reopened on 20 March 2017.

In April 2016, the Half Moon made international news after a picture of its barred list became a viral hit on Twitter. A book of stories inspired by the barred list has successfully been crowd-funded, and is currently being designed and edited. The book hit its fundraising target of £4,000 on crowdfunding publisher Unbound in October 2017, although a publication date is currently not known.

A community campaign to save the music venue at the rear of the pub received backing from local celebrities including Jo Brand, La Roux, and even the Mayor of London, but suffered a setback in April 2016 when Southwark Council approved plans to remove the stage and replace it with a new kitchen and dining area. Whilst no longer a regular music venue, the Half Moon hosts live entertainment each year for Dylan Day on 14 May, celebrating the connection of Dylan Thomas with the pub. It is also used as a venue for the annual Herne Hill Music Festival and Herne Hill Free Film Festival. The new function room, called 'The Workshop', is located in a converted 1920s garage building at the back of the Half Moon.

In 2018, the Half Moon was a finalist in The Publican Awards for 'Best New Pub/Bar'. In May 2018, the Half Moon was named the Regional Winner for London in the National Pub and Bar Awards. In November 2019, the pub was named winner of The Griffin Trophy, for Fuller's best pub.

== See also ==
- Grade II* listed buildings in the London Borough of Southwark
- List of pubs in London
