= Bell House, Dulwich =

Georgian house in London, England

Coordinates: 51.4445°N 0.0845°W

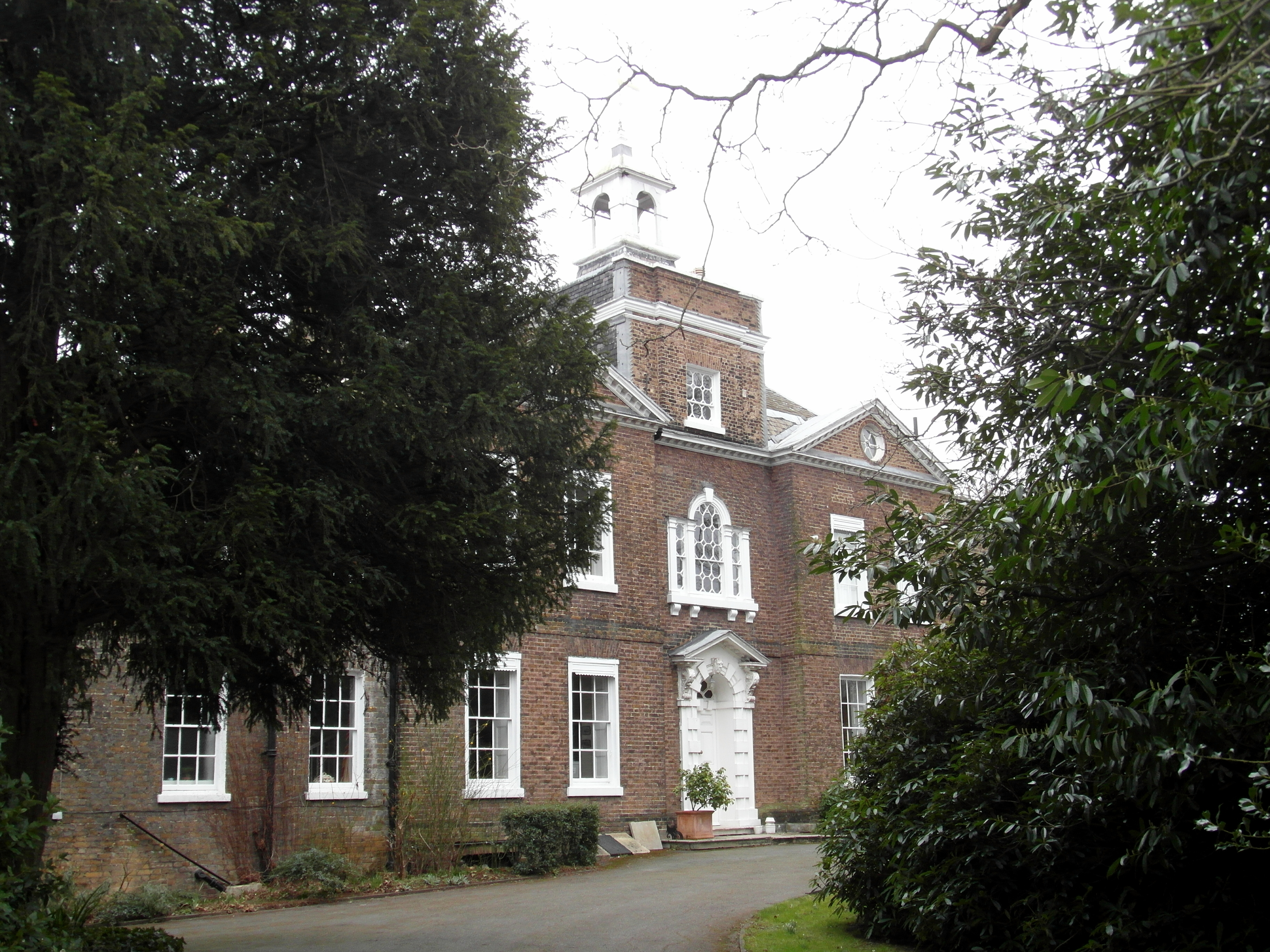
Bell House

Bell House is a large Georgian house on College Road in Dulwich, South East London.

It is Grade II* listed on the National Heritage List for England. It was built in 1767 for Thomas Wright, who was Sheriff of the City of London in 1779 and Lord Mayor of London in 1785. Thomas Wright made his fortune as a stationer and from publishing almanacs.

The house gets its name from the striking bell tower. Whenever a fire broke out in the village, the bells of Bell House and the Dulwich College chapel were rung to gather help in pumping up water for the village fire engine. Thomas Wright lived at Bell House until his death on 7 April 1798. In 1833, the house was extended to provide servants' quarters. Further extensions were made in the 1870s and Sir Edwin Lutyens was engaged to carry out certain alterations in 1918.

Dulwich College took over the lease of Bell House in 1926 and it became the official residence of the Master of the College in 1927. During the Second World War the Master moved out of Bell House to a smaller house and in 1947 the building became a junior boarding house. In 1993 it was returned to private ownership, as the college recognised the reduced need for a second junior boarding house. The house was bought in the summer of 2016 by an educational charity – Bell House Dulwich.
