= Six Pillars House =

Listed building in the London Borough of Southwark

Six Pillars
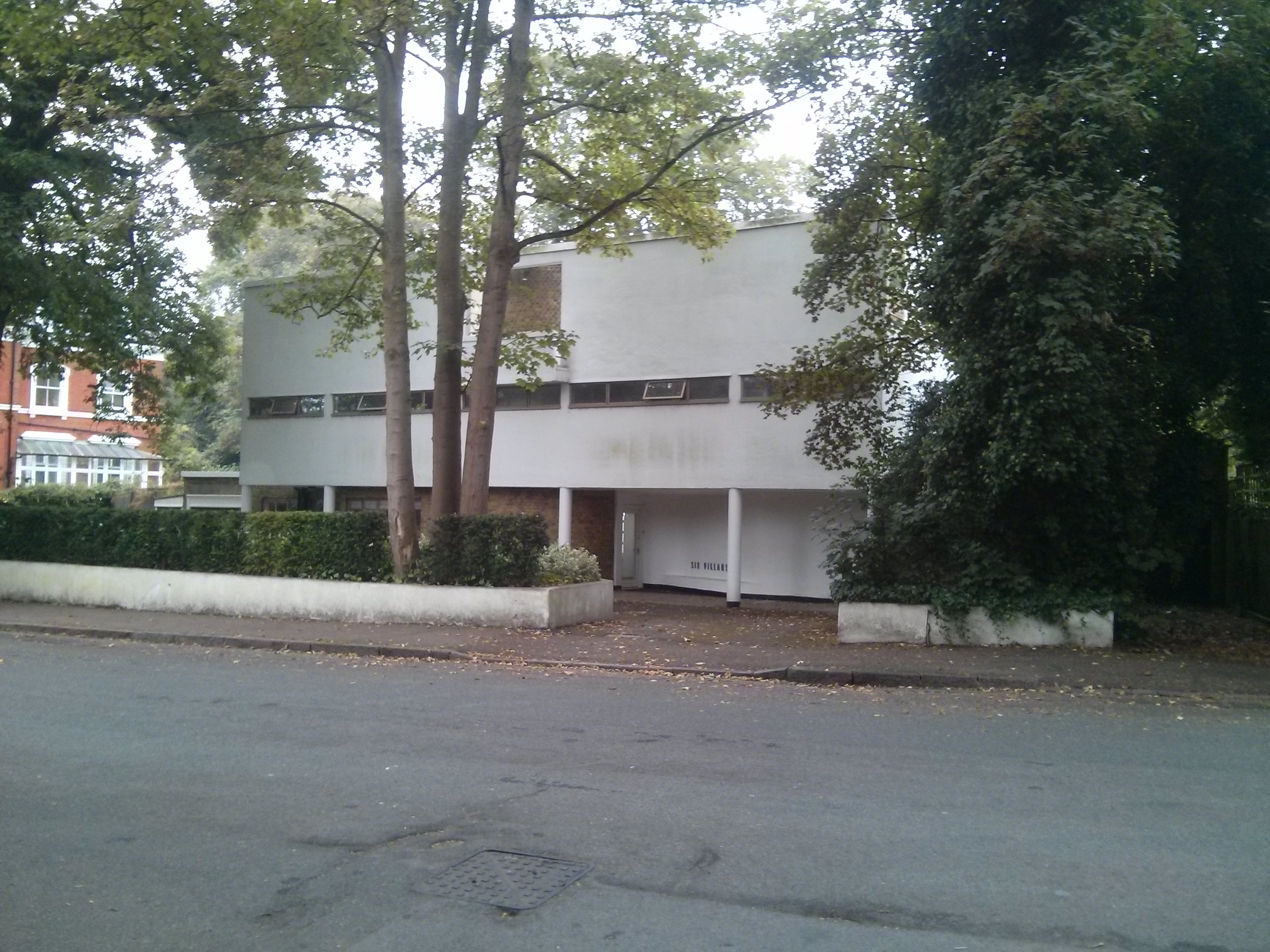
- Six Pillars in 2014
- Interactive map of the Six Pillars area

General information
- Status: Completed
- Type: House
- Architectural style: Modernist
- Classification: Grade II*
- Location: Sydenham, London Borough of Southwark, London, United Kingdom
- Coordinates: 51.4332°N 0.0724°W
- Construction started: 1932

Technical details
- Material: London stock brick

Six Pillars is a Grade II* listed building in Sydenham in the London Borough of Southwark. The house was built in the 1930s in the modernist style.

== History ==
Six Pillars is in Sydenham in the London Borough of Southwark, opposite Dulwich Wood. It is the only modernist house in its street as the other houses are more ordinary townhouses or Victorian villas. Six Pillars was built by architect Valentine Harding, who was working for Tecton Group. The company also built Highpoint I and the penguin enclosure at London Zoo, both of which are listed Grade I. It is one of four houses built by Harding, who died at the Battle of Dunkirk in 1940. It was built in the style of Villa Savoye, built by Le Corbusier, and contains "glascrete" (concrete containing glass) to maximise the amount of sunlight in the house.

The house was built between 1932 and 1934 for John Leakey, headmaster of Dulwich College Preparatory School, and his wife. It was built of London stock brick in a minimalist style so that it did not stand out from the Victorian era houses. The house was also set back from the road. The house, when built, contained four bathrooms, two bedrooms, three reception rooms, a study, and two maid's quarters. The ground floor of the house is divided by six cylindrical pillars, which gives the house its name. The entrance hall spans two floors and contains a sculpted staircase. The rear of the house contains strip windows, built in the same style as Highpoint I, and there is a first-floor glass balcony. The house covers an area of 3,000 square feet (280 m^{2}).

In 1981, Six Pillars became a Grade II* listed building. In 1989, it was put on the market for £365,000. The house featured in the 1992 book Lubetkin & Tecton: An Architectural Study. In 1998, it was bought by Roger Trapp, who commissioned John Winter to undertake a restoration. Six Pillars House was put up for sale in 2012 with a guide price of £1,675,000.
