= Classic Jack Live! =

Video by John Farnham
- Released: 13 November 2005 (Australia)
- Recorded: 1989
- Genres: Pop, rock
- Length: 1:28:33
- Label: Sony BMG
- Producer: Richard Brobyn

John Farnham chronology
I Remember When I Was Young: Songs from The Great Australian Songbook (2005)	Classic Jack Live! (2005)	Chain Reaction Live in Concert (2005)

Classic Jack Live! (subtitled "John Farnham and the Melbourne Symphony Orchestra") is a DVD release by Australian singer John Farnham. The DVD was released by Sony BMG in Australia on 13 November 2005 in conjunction with Chain Reaction Live in Concert.

This DVD contains John Farnham's performance with the Melbourne Symphony Orchestra at the National Tennis Centre, Melbourne conducted by Dobbs Franks in 1989. This program was originally aired on Australia's Channel Seven in 1989.

== DVD track listing ==
1. "Pressure Down" (H. Bogdanovs) – 4:59
2. "Two Strong Hearts" (B. Woolley, A. Hill) – 3:39
3. "Age of Reason" (T. Hunter, J. Pigott) – 8:27
4. "Beyond the Call" (D. Batteau, D. Brown, K. Dukes) – 4:39
5. "Blow By Blow" (D. Stewart, O. Ormo, B. Harrison) – 5:03
6. "We're No Angels" (R. Wilson) – 7:02
7. "Please Don't Ask Me" (G. Goble) – 5:15
8. "Comic Conversations " (J. Bromley) – 3:54
9. "One" (H. Nilsson) – 3:00
10. "Reasons" (S. See) – 4:21
11. "Playing to Win" (G. Goble, J. Farnham, D. Hirschfelder, S. Housden, S. Proffer, W. Nelson, S. Prestwich) – 3:00
12. "You're the Voice" (M. Ryder, C. Thompson, A. Qunta, K. Reid) – 7:28
13. "A Touch of Paradise" (R. Wilson, G. Smith) – 5:12
14. "Help!" (J. Lennon, P. McCartney) – 6:46
15. "Sadie (The Cleaning Lady)" (Gilmore, Madara) – 7:19
16. "It's a Long Way to the Top (If You Wanna Rock 'n' Roll)" (A. Young, M. Young, B. Scott – 5:03
17. "Don't You Know It's Magic" (B. Cadd) – 3:34

== Charts ==
Chart (2005–2006)	Peak position
Australia DVD (ARIA)	6

== Certifications ==
Region	Certification	Certified units/sales
Australia (ARIA)	Platinum	15,000^{^}
^{^} Shipments figures based on certification alone.
