= World Liberty Concert =

- The logo of the World Liberty Concert, as broadcast live.
- Genre: Rock music Pop music
- Dates: 8 May 1995
- Locations: Stadsblokken, Arnhem, Netherlands
- Years active: 1995
- Founders: Arno Geul; Alan Parsons

Overview of the concert, showing the stage next to the bridge.

The World Liberty Concert was a concert that took place on 8 May 1995 next to the John Frost Bridge in Arnhem in the Netherlands. The concert was held in honor of the fiftieth anniversary of the liberation of Europe and is the largest memorial concert ever held in the Netherlands and was thought of by Arno Geul. Preparations lasted for about a year.

Performances were provided by Alan Parsons (with Chris Thompson and Mick Mullins), Art Garfunkel, Joe Cocker, Cyndi Lauper, Wet Wet Wet, Candy Dulfer, UB40 and René Froger. Also present was the Metropole Orkest consisting of 80 men and the Gelders Opera and Operetta Gezelschap (GOOG) choir. The event-specific configuration of The Alan Parsons Project, which had been a studio group only, was one of the first live performances of the band's material, albeit without cofounder Eric Woolfson (who had split from Parsons before Try Anything Once and the accompanying tour captured on Alan Parsons Live); it was performed under the name of Alan Parsons Band. The musical performances were accompanied by historical readings by Walter Cronkite and an illustrative performance by the Royal Netherlands Army.

The broadcast portion of the concert lasted about 2 hours, was attended by 85,000 people and was broadcast in 45 countries, of which 31 were live. The entire concert lasted over 12 hours.

== Evening Concert ==
The evening concert was broadcast live and was initiated by a seven-and-a-half-minute introduction, showing the various preparations for the concert. The video featured a medley of classical songs of the soundtrack of the movie Glory. In total, the evening concert covered 21 songs:

Artists	Song	Notes
Alan Parsons Band, Metropole Orkest, Gelders Opera and Operetta Society	World Liberty Theme	Walter Cronkite makes his appearance at the broadcast during this song.
Metropole Orkest, Gelders Opera and Operetta Society	Black Horizon	Quite a dramatical classical piece, accompanying the invasion by the aggressor (dressed in brown).
Joe Cocker, Alan Parsons Band, Metropole Orkest	Let The Healing Begin	Imagery of the Normandy landings is shown during the song.
Alan Parsons Band, Metropole Orkest	Sirius	At the beginning of the song an Air alarm is run for a couple of swoops.
Alan Parsons Band, Candy Dulfer, Metropole Orkest	Breakaway	Fireworks were lit halfway down the song.
Cyndi Lauper	Time After Time	Old video material of WWII paratroopers is shown. Near the concert's location voluntary parachutists are coming down.
Alan Parsons Band, Metropole Orkest, Gelders Opera and Operetta Society	White Dawn	The allied forces presents themselves (dressed in white) and capture the aggressor at the bridge.
UB40	Sing Our Own Song	
René Froger, Metropole Orkest	Thunder in My Heart	
Alan Parsons Band, Candy Dulfer	Old and Wise	
UB40	Many Rivers to Cross	
Alan Parsons Band, Candy Dulfer	The Gold Bug	On the Rhine rubber boats of the Army make circles, while carrying flags of the United Nations. On the bridge young female performers wave the flags of the United Nations in a choreographed manner.
Cyndi Lauper	True Colors	Rubber boats of the army cross the Rhine.
Wet Wet Wet, Metropole Orkest	Love Is All Around	
Candy Dulfer	I Can't Make You Love Me (Instrumental)	
Joe Cocker, Alan Parsons Band	With a Little Help from My Friends	
Alan Parsons Band, Metropole Orkest	The Dream of Peace (Sirius Reprise)	Fireworks were lit halfway down the song.
Alan Parsons Band, Metropole Orkest	Eye in the Sky	A helicopter hovered above the Rhine.
Wet Wet Wet, Metropole Orkest	Julia Says	
Chris Thompson, Alan Parsons Band, Metropole Orkest	You're the Voice	Volunteers held burning torches at the side of the Rhine, which was also decorated by spraying water fountains.
Art Garfunkel	Bridge over Troubled Water	The end of the song was accompanied by fireworks.

=== Narrative ===
Walter Cronkite as he appeared during the television broadcast of the concert.

During the concert, Walter Cronkite narrated parts of history during and after the Second World War, in order to illustrate the historical meaning of the concert. During the concert Walter Cronkite was positioned at the side of the Rhine, in a military Jeep.

In his initial appearance at the beginning of the concert, Walter Cronkite both describes the reason for his presence and the reason for the concert:

I am here tonight, because as a war correspondent, I was part of the allied airborne operation that for a brief moment in history, more than fifty years ago, focused the world's attention on this crossing of the Rhine and this Dutch City of Arnhem. I speak tonight from hallowed ground, for here more than 1500 brave British parachutists died in a futile attempt to gain the bridge. 6000 were captured, many of them wounded. They represent for us tonight, the millions of others, soldiers, sailors, airmen and civilians, claimed in history’s worst calamity. In a war whose long delayed ending, this concert commemorates and celebrates. In May 1944 the European continent had been a major battleground for almost four years. The country's provinces, cities and more importantly the people of Europe were devastated by the toll of mankind’s Second World War. Beginning just 50 kilometers upstream from this City of Arnhem, stretched the heartland of the aggressor's war industry. While the sounds of the factories were of course too far off to be heard from here, life was dominated by the ominous sound of a not so distant thunder.

In total, Walter Cronkite makes 11 appearances during the concert, covering the history in chronological order:

1. Introduction and description of the situation of the region in 1944.
2. Description of the Normandy landings, and the significance of D-Day as a turning point.
3. Arnhem and its Rhine bridge was becoming a strategic focal point in the summer of 1944, which caused preparations for an operation to be made.
4. Paratroops were dropped in Operation Market Garden, but the effort failed.
5. The defeat during Operation Market Garden destroyed the hopes and the city of Arnhem.
6. On 5 May 1945, the Netherlands were liberated and three days later the peace treaty was signed.
7. In June 1945 the United Nations was established, to maintain international peace and security.
8. In 1995 the benefits of the United Nations are visible to us all.
9. The European Union is a new reality and a growing world power.
10. Much work is being done by organizations such as UNICEF, for the youth of today, the world leaders of tomorrow.
11. It is up to the next generation to accomplish world peace, which the current generation has failed to accomplish.

== Releases ==
The evening concert was supposed to be released as video and CD. A legal dispute made only a single, You're the Voice, be released, which included the live recordings of "White Dawn" and "You're the Voice", the latter however as a "radio edit" that fades out after four minutes, while the live performance lasted a minute longer. Despite the lack of a full release, bootlegs of the broadcast are circulating. A studio recording of "You're the Voice" was recorded a few months earlier and featured on the 15-track edition of the Alan Parsons album The Very Best Live, albeit in a longer version.
