= Gary Howard =

British musician (born 1955)

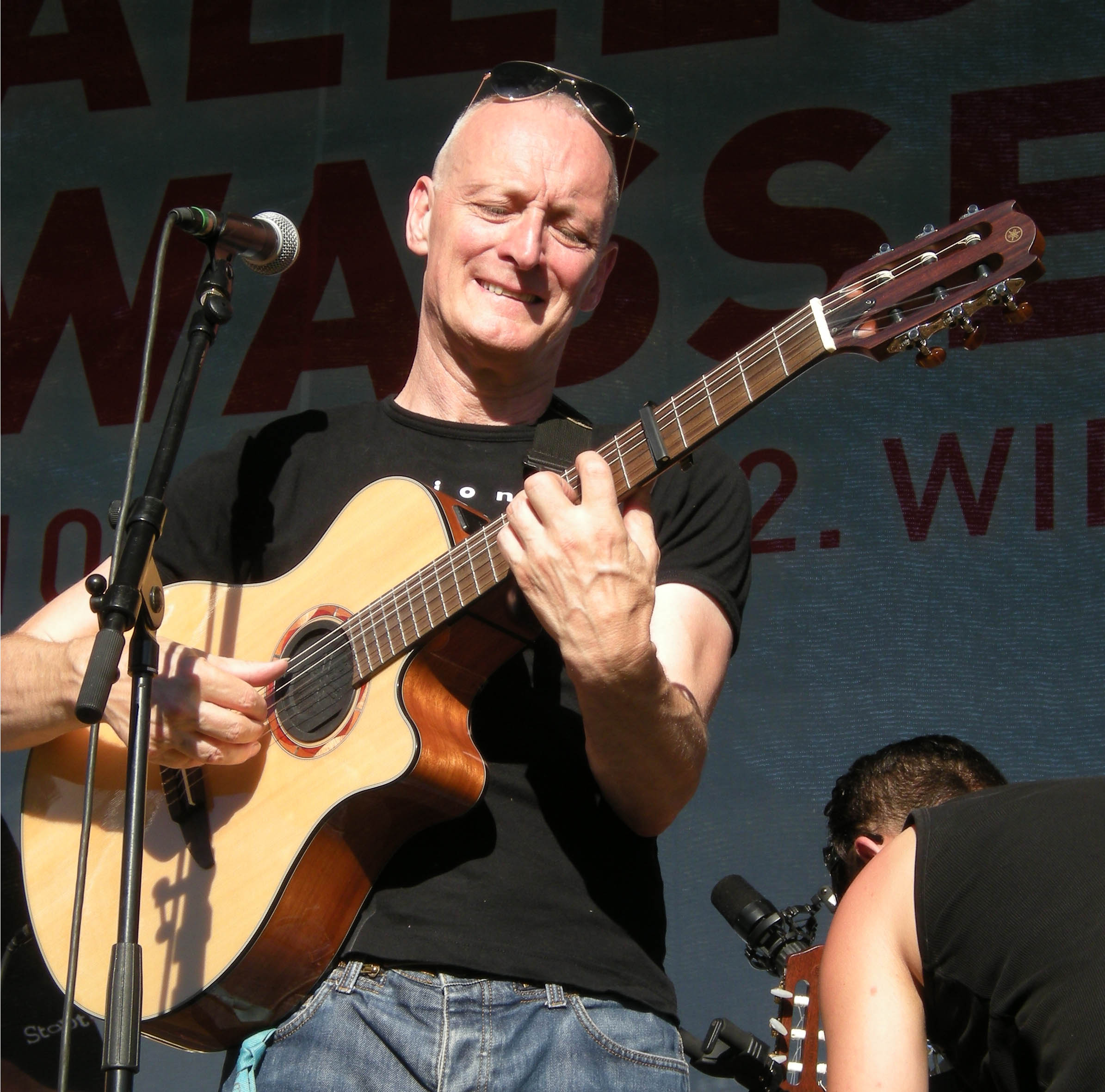
- Howard performing at the Alles Wasser-Festival in Vienna (2008)
- Born: Gary William Howard; 16 June 1955 (age 70); Ilford, Essex, England
- Occupation: Musician
- Years active: 1979–present

Gary William Howard (born 16 June 1955) is a British musician, best known as a member of the a cappella group The Flying Pickets.

== Early life ==
Gary William Howard was born in Ilford, Essex on 16 June 1955. His father John was a mechanic who was also in a folk band called the Pathfinders, for whom John played acoustic guitar. John also taught Howard how to play acoustic guitar, and Howard subsequently began to play frequently with his father and the band at the age of seven. Howard describes his father as one of the greatest influences in his life. Howard's mother Angie was a nurse.

Howard spent his entire childhood in Liverpool and attended the Liverpool Collegiate School and the King David School. He dropped out of school at the age of 16, and worked as a welder. After three years working as a welder, Howard finally got his dream of entering the Liverpool Hope University, where he began studying as an engineer. In 1971, he got a degree in mechanical engineering, and between 1971 and 1979, he worked as one of the Royal Engineers. His musical career then began in 1979, when he began performing acoustic guitar for the Royal Engineers Acoustic Group, along with his fellow engineers.

== Musical career ==
Howard's musical career began when he was seven when he began playing acoustic guitar for a folk rock group the Pathfinders, for whom Howard's father John also played acoustic guitar. However, Howard rose to prominence as a member of the Royal Engineers Acoustic Band, for whom he played acoustic guitar from 1979 to 1985. In 1985, he left the Royal Engineers to pursue a career as a solo recording artist, and found himself working with The Christians and Paul McCartney.

In 1986, Howard became noticed by the a cappella group The Flying Pickets, who had had a hit in the charts years before with a cover version of Yazoo's "Only You". The Flying Pickets recruited Howard to play backing acoustics during their recording and performing sessions, and through his years with The Flying Pickets he became close friends with the band's late lead vocalist Brian Hibbard. Howard remained with the band for over a decade, before departing to pursue a solo music career, although he remained close to Hibbard right up to Hibbard's death from cancer in 2012.

== After the Flying Pickets ==
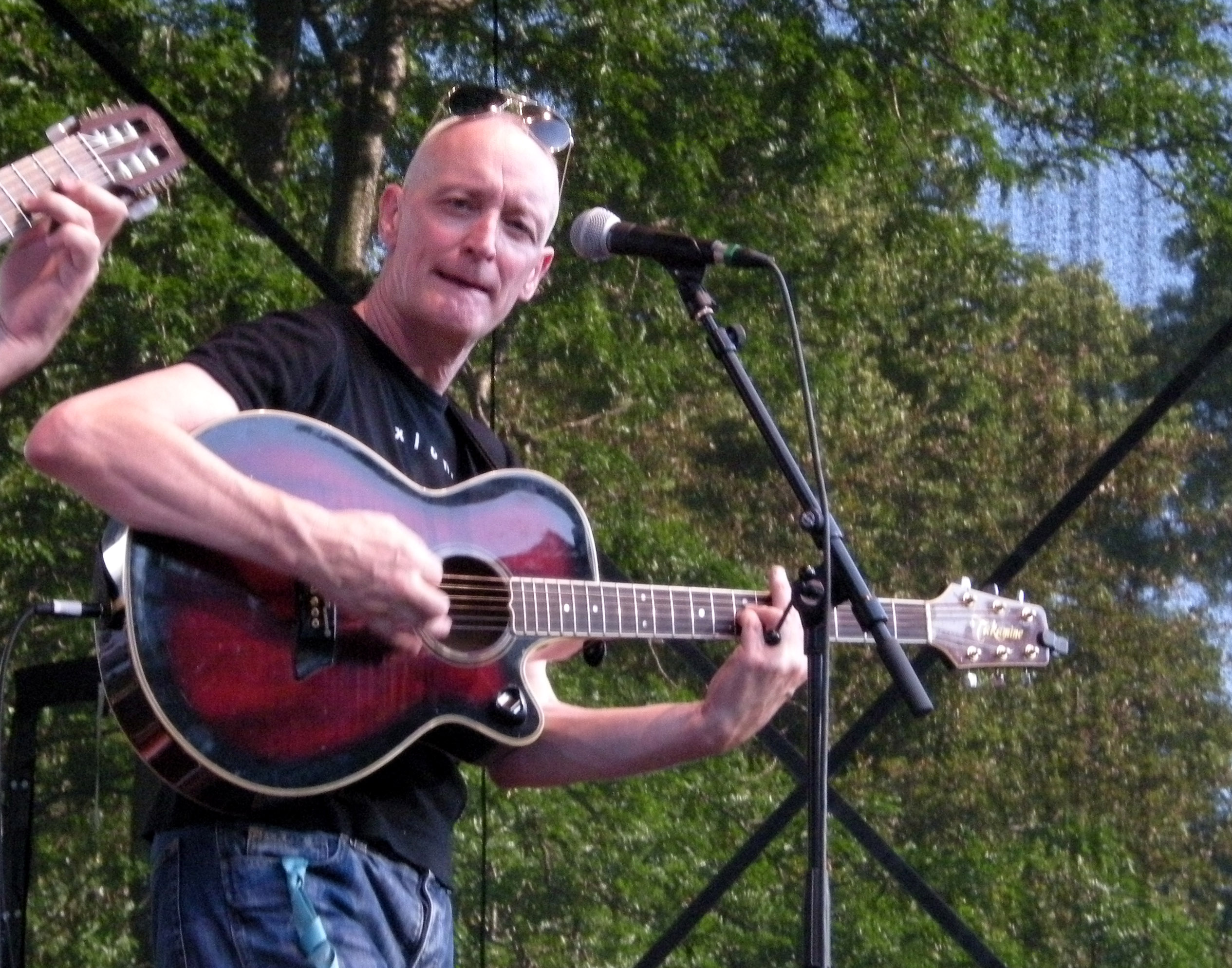
Gary Howard performing at the Isle of Wight Festival in 2010

After his departure from the Flying Pickets in 1994, Howard toured as a singer with the Alan Parsons Live band and appeared on their album. Howard got his first big solo score with an acoustic version of the Gerry & the Pacemakers hit and Liverpool F.C. anthem "You'll Never Walk Alone", which he released with Virgin Records in 1996. This, and his own acoustic versions of Yazoo and Flying Pickets hit "Only You" and Leonard Cohen's "Hallelujah", as well as his own penned single "Stay for the Night", were also released on his Virgin Records debut album, Come As You Please, which was released on 23 November 2003.

In 2009, he released his first single in six years, his own penned single "I'm Losing You", which charted in the UK Singles Chart. The following year, an acoustic version of the "Chicago" hit "If You Leave Me Now" was accompanied by his second album Dreaming of Paradise, another popular album, released on 4 July 2010. The album was even more successful than his debut album, with this album reaching Number 12 in the UK Albums Chart after his debut album reached Number 25.

On 2 July 2012, Howard fronted a Flying Pickets reunion in a concert dedicated to the Flying Pickets late lead singer Brian Hibbard, who had died following a prolonged battle with prostate cancer. The concert featured Howard on acoustic guitar with new lead vocalist Andrea Figallo on lead vocals, and also featured appearances by Alison Moyet, Gerry Marsden, Paul McCartney, Jim Diamond and Tony Christie. In 2015, Howard joined the European Tour of Austrian AOR-band Cornerstone for a few concerts.

== Isle of Wight Festival ==
Since 1995, Howard has performed annually at the Isle of Wight Festival along with his backing band The Jazzmasters. At the Festival, he regularly plays some hits by the Flying Pickets and other artists, and has also performed some of his own written songs.

== Personal life ==
Howard has been married to his wife Alison Brannigan since 1980. They have two daughters, Emma and Kirsty, and a son, David. Howard and Alison currently reside in Wallasey, Merseyside, with their pet Alsatian Scotty.

Howard is a strong supporter of Liverpool F.C., and sang a renowned version of their anthem "You'll Never Walk Alone", originally composed by Rodgers and Hammerstein for the Musical Carousel. It was made popular in the 1960s by Gerry & the Pacemakers, one of his greatest influences.
