= Chain Reaction Live in Concert =

Video by John Farnham
- Released: 13 November 2005 (Australia)
- Recorded: 1990
- Genres: Pop, rock
- Length: 1:48:54
- Label: Sony BMG
- Producer: Richard Brobyn

John Farnham chronology
Classic Jack Live! (2005)	Chain Reaction Live in Concert (2005)	With the Sydney Symphony Live at the Sydney Opera House (2006)

Chain Reaction Live in Concert (originally titled "Chain Reaction Tour") is a DVD release by Australian singer John Farnham. The DVD was released in Australia on 13 November 2005 in conjunction with Classic Jack Live!.

This DVD contains John Farnham's performance at the Flinders Park National Tennis Centre, Melbourne in 1990 during his "Chain Reaction" Tour. This program was originally aired on Australia's Channel Seven in 1990.

== DVD track listing ==
1. "Intro" – 1:31
2. "See the Banners Fall" (J. Farnham, D. Hirschfelder, R. Fraser) – 4:52
3. "In Your Hands" (P. Buckle, J. Farnham, R. Faser) – 4:29
4. "Age of Reason" (T. Hunter, J. Pigott) – 11:15
5. "Sadie (The Cleaning Lady)" (Gilmore, Madara) – 2:11
6. "Two Strong Hearts" (B. Woolley, A. Hill) – 6:12
7. "In Days to Come" (J. Farnham, D. Hirschfelder, R. Fraser) – 5:07
8. "The Time Has Come" (J. Creighton, J. Farnham, R. Fraser) – 5:17
9. "I Can Do Anything" (P. Buckle, J. Farnham, R. Faser) – 5:26
10. "A Touch of Paradise" (R. Wilson, G. Smith) – 5:01
11. "Burn for You" (P. Buckle, J. Farnham, R. Faser) – 4:45
12. "Reasons" (S. See) – 4:16
13. "Pressure Down " (H. Bogdanovs) – 4:03
14. "Playing to Win" (G. Goble, J. Farnham, D. Hirschfelder, S. Housden, S. Proffer, W. Nelson, S. Prestwich) – 3:06
15. "That's Freedom" (T. Kimmel, J. Chapman) – 4:33
16. "You're the Voice" (M. Ryder, C. Thompson, A. Qunta, K. Reid) – 6:29
17. "Chain Reaction" (D. Stewart, S. Stewart) – 5:34
18. "Help!" (J. Lennon, P. McCartney) – 1 13:27
19. "Love's in Need" (S. Wonder) – 4:28
20. "All Our Sons and Daughters" (P. Buckle, J. Farnham, R. Faser) – 4:33
21. "Credits " – 2:29

== Charts ==
Chart (2005–2006)	Peak position
Australia DVD (ARIA)	5

== Certifications ==
Region	Certification	Certified units/sales
Australia (ARIA)	Platinum	15,000^{^}
^{^} Shipments figures based on certification alone.
