= Gavin Muir =

Gavin Muir may refer to:

- Gavin Muir (British actor) (1951–2002), British actor and musician
- Gavin Muir (American actor) (1900–1972), American Broadway, film and television actor
