= Chris Thompson (English musician) =

English musician (born 1947)

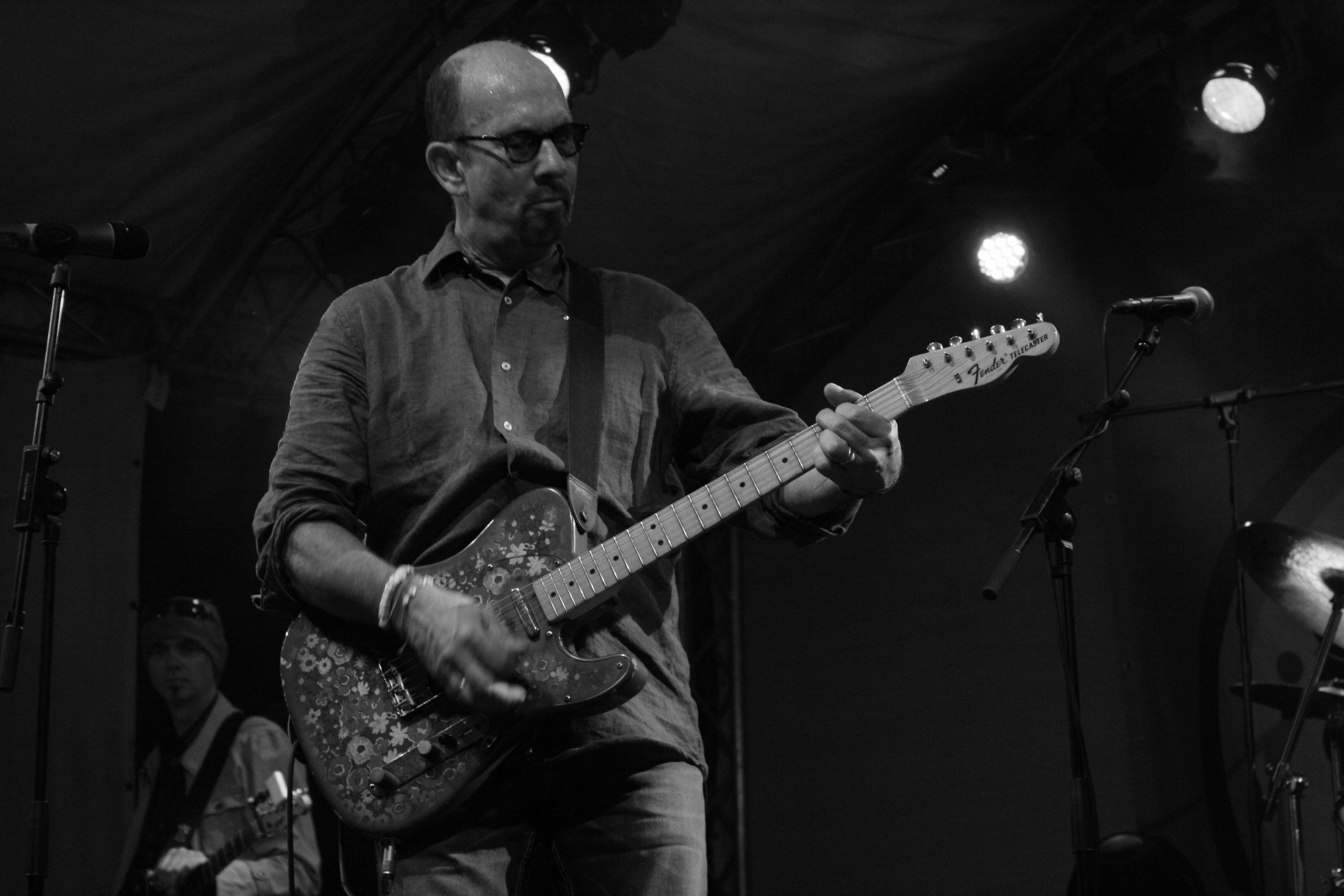
- Thompson in 2010

Background information
- Born: Christopher Hamlet Thompson; 9 March 1947 (age 79); Hertford, Hertfordshire , England
- Genres: Rock; progressive rock
- Occupations: Singer; songwriter
- Instruments: Vocals; guitar; harmonica
- Years active: 1970s–2022
- Labels: Ultraphone; Ariola; Atlantic
- Website: christhompson-central.com

Christopher Hamlet Thompson (born 9 March 1947) is an English singer, songwriter and guitarist known both for his work with Manfred Mann's Earth Band, specifically for his lead vocal on the classic hit "Blinded by the Light" and for his solo accomplishments. In his early career, he used the self-chosen middle name 'Hamlet' to distinguish himself from a folk singer of the same name, who also came from New Zealand, the place where Thompson was brought up.

== Biography ==
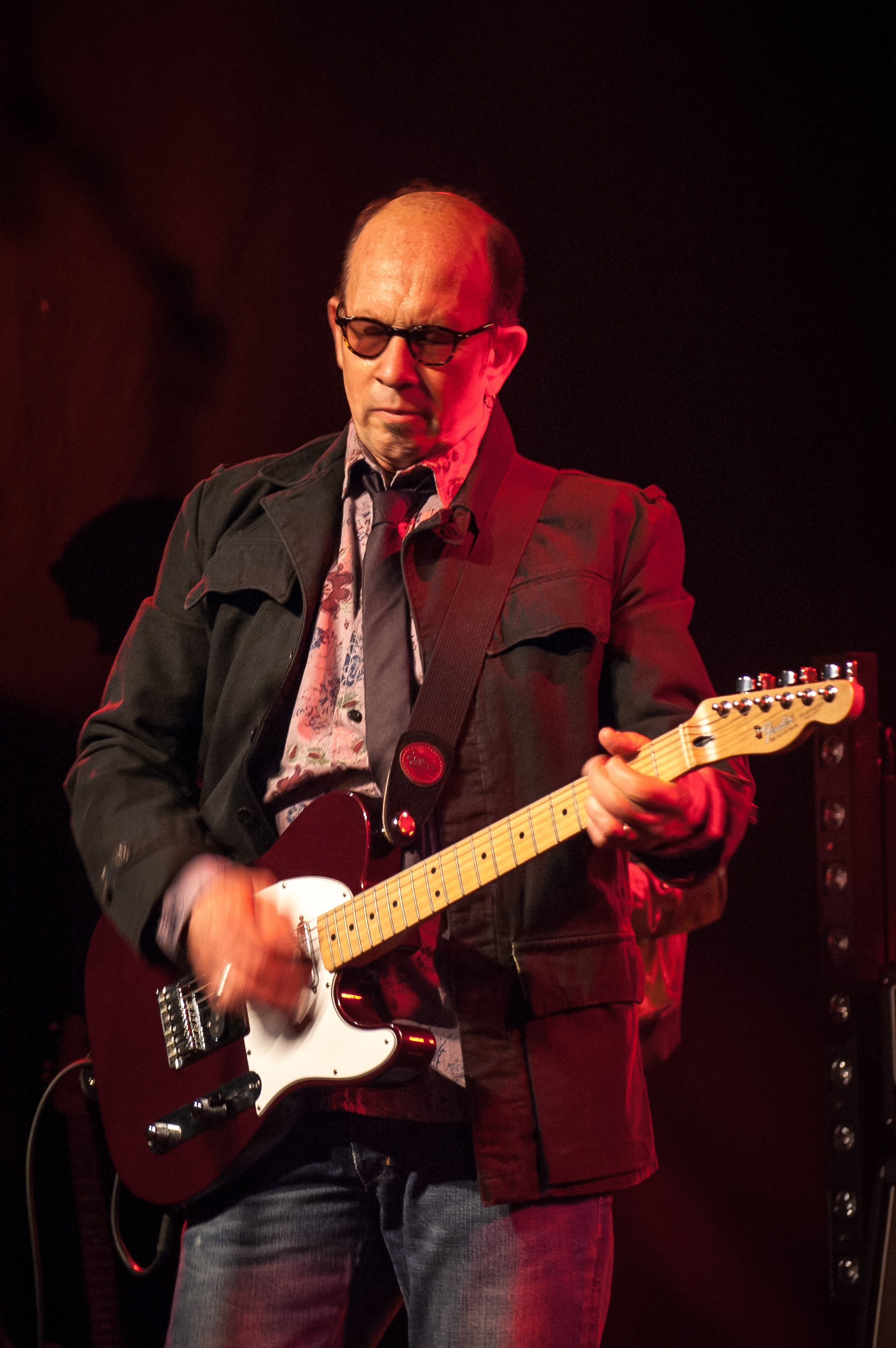
Chris Thompson in Brønnøysund (2008).

Thompson was born in Hertford, Hertfordshire, England, but raised in New Zealand. His early musical experiences were whilst still at school with the band The Paragons that played at weekly church youth club dances. Later, as his talent became clear, the band was reformed as Dynasty with other musicians and achieved much local success on the New Zealand music scene. Thompson's last band in New Zealand was Mandrake, formed with university friends who played the Friday and Saturday night dances in and around Hamilton City.

He went to Australia before returning to England in 1973 to pursue a musical career, eventually joining Manfred Mann's Earth Band in 1976.

In 1978, he was featured in Jeff Wayne's Musical Version of The War of the Worlds, providing lead vocals for the song "Thunder Child".

After several years with Manfred Mann's Earth Band, Thompson left in 1979 and formed the Los Angeles–based outfit Night, which enjoyed two hits during its lifetime. One of them, "If You Remember Me," the unused theme song for Franco Zeffirelli's remake of The Champ, was initially credited solely to Thompson; later pressings of the single were credited to "Chris Thompson and Night." (But this source gives lyric credit to Carole Bayer Sager for "If You Remember Me," and the music credit to Marvin Hamlisch.) The song reached #17 on the U.S. Billboard Hot 100 and #7 Adult Contemporary. It was a very minor hit in Canada (#91). After the band broke up in 1982, he rejoined the Earth Band.

In 1980, he co-wrote and sang backing vocals on the track "No Stoppin' Us Now" with Patrick Simmons and Michael McDonald, on the Doobie Brothers' album One Step Closer. In 1983 he contributed vocals to Simmons' solo album Arcade as well as co-writing several of the tracks.

In 1981, Thompson released his debut album, Out of the Night. This was followed by five more albums, most recently Won't Lie Down in 2001.

In 1984, while functional lead singer for the re-formed Manfred Mann's Earth Band, Thompson lent lead vocals to "Runner," which slowly climbed to become a USA and UK top 30 hit, propelled by then-hot MTV airplay.

In 1986, Thompson was one of the four co-writers of the hit song "You're the Voice" – the others being Andy Qunta of Australian new wave outfit Icehouse, erstwhile Procol Harum lyricist Keith Reid and Maggie Ryder. He hoped to record the song in London but was turned down by record companies there who stated the song was "not commercial". He sent a demo to John Farnham, who had recently come off a five-year stint fronting the Little River Band. Farnham liked the song and agreed to record it for his forthcoming album, Whispering Jack. Farnham's release of "You're the Voice" was a worldwide hit, reaching top ten positions in many countries across the world.

Also in 1986, Thompson sang vocals on a solo album by ex-Genesis guitarist Steve Hackett. The album featured performances by artists such as Brian May (Queen), Pete Trewavas (Marillion), Ian Mosley (also from Marillion), and Bonnie Tyler. However, the album, entitled Feedback 86, was not released until 2000.

In spite of his already busy schedule in 1986, Thompson still found the time to return to Manfred Mann for their new album, Criminal Tango, in addition to putting out some solo material. He recorded the song "It's Not Over" for the soundtrack to the film Playing for Keeps, and this track was also featured (with a slightly longer fade-out) on his new solo album, High Cost of Living, released later the same year. The following year, "It's Not Over" would be re-recorded by Starship, becoming a top-ten hit for the group.

In 1989, Thompson recorded the single "The Challenge (Face It)" as the official theme song for the 1989 Wimbledon Tennis Championships. He co-wrote the song with Harold Faltermeyer. A year later, in 1990, Thompson worked again with Faltermeyer in writing the 1990 song for Wimbledon, Hold the Dream by Franzisca.

Also in 1989, Thompson recorded the single "This Is The Moment" as the official theme song for the 1990 Commonwealth Games in Auckland.

In 1992, Thompson performed at the Freddie Mercury Tribute Concert as a backing musician, harmonising as the baritone with respected backing vocalists Maggie Ryder (contralto) and Miriam Stockley (mezzo-soprano). He also joined The Brian May Band for their South American tour the same year.

In 1995, Thompson performed "You're The Voice" in the Netherlands at the World Liberty Concert as the grand finale of the event. He also sang a studio version of it on the Alan Parsons The Very Best Live album (1995).

In 2006 and 2007, he joined Jeff Wayne for a second time to tour as The Voice of Humanity in the live version of Jeff Wayne's Musical Version of The War of the Worlds. According to the special features of the DVD Jeff Wayne's Musical Version of The War of the Worlds – Live on Stage, Thompson designed some artwork for the show.

Thompson has been featured on several albums by artists such as Alan Parsons, Jan Hammer, Steve Hackett, Bonnie Tyler, Mike Oldfield, and Sarah Brightman, as well as providing backing vocals for Brian May of Queen, during his first few solo concerts in South America in 1992.

Thompson has also been involved with the SAS Band (Spike's All Star Band) where he has performed numerous songs, especially from his repertoire with Manfred Mann's Earth Band.

== Discography ==
=== With Manfred Mann's Earth Band ===
- The Roaring Silence (1976)
- Watch (1978)
- Angel Station (1979)
- Chance (1980)
- Somewhere in Afrika (1982)
- Budapest Live (1983)
- Criminal Tango (1986)
- Soft Vengeance (1996)
- Mann Alive (1998)
- 2006 (2004)

=== Solo ===
- If You Remember Me (1979)
- Out of the Night (1983)
- Radio Voices (1985)
- High Cost of Living (1986)
- The Challenge (Face It) (1989)
- This Is The Moment (Official song of the 1990 Commonwealth Games) (1989)
- Beat of Love (1991)
- Backtrack 1980-1994 (1999)
- Won't Lie Down (2001)
- Rediscovery (2004)
- Timeline (2005)
- Chris Thompson & Band – One Hot Night in the Cold (Live at the Private Music Club) (2006)
- Do Nothing Till You Hear from Me (2012)
- Toys & Dishes (2014)
- Jukebox-The Ultimate Collection 1975-2015 (2015)

=== Other collaborations ===
- A Week at the Bridge E16 (1978) With Filthy McNasty (before becoming Night)
- Jeff Wayne's Musical Version of The War of the Worlds (1978) With Jeff Wayne
- A Single Man (1978) with Elton John
- The Garden of Love (1978) with Don Ray
- Night (1979) with Night
- Long Distance (1981) with Night
- One Step Closer (1980) with The Doobie Brothers
- Wolf (1981) with Trevor Rabin
- Waving Not Drowning (1982) with Rupert Hine
- "All the Right Moves" (1983) with Jennifer Warnes
- Arcade (1983) with Patrick Simmons
- Push and Shove (1985) with Chris Thompson With Hazel O'Connor
- Running the Endless Mile (1986) with John Parr
- Seeds of Life (1986) with Jan Hammer
- Whispering Jack (1986) With John Farnham
- Robbie Nevil (1986) with Robbie Nevil
- A Place Like This (1988) with Robbie Nevil
- Love Among the Cannibals (1989) with Starship
- Tabaluga and the Magic Jadestone (1988) with Peter Maffay
- Take What You Need (1989) with Robin Trower
- After the War (1989) with Gary Moore
- Earth Moving (1989) with Mike Oldfield
- Try Anything Once (1993) with Alan Parsons
- Alan Parsons Live/The Very Best Live (1994/95) with Alan Parsons
- Excalibur featuring Michael Ernst (2003) with Alan Parsons
- Free Spirit (1996) with Bonnie Tyler
- SAS Band (1997) with SAS Band
- The Show (2001) with SAS Band
- Metallic Blue (1998) with Steelhouse Lane
- Slaves of New World (1999) with Steelhouse Lane
- Feedback 86 (2000) with Steve Hackett
- Redhanded (2001) with Mads Eriksen
- Rediscovery (2004) With Mads Eriksen
- Berlin Live & The Aschaffenburg Remains Live at the Colos-Saal (2012) with Mads Eriksen
- Soulmates (2002) with Mandoki Soulmates
- Jazz Cuts (2003) with Mandoki Soulmates
- Allstars, "Legends of Rock" (2004) with Mandoki Soulmates
- BudaBest (2013) with Mandoki Soulmates
- Polarity (2003) with Lava
- Excalibur (2003) with Michael Ernst
- Live (2005) with Siggi Schwarz & The Rock Legends
- Woodstock (2005) with Siggi Schwarz & The Rock Legends
- Soul Classics (2007) with Siggi Schwarz & The Rock Legends
- On My Side (2006) with Rudi Buttas
- How Can Heaven Love Me (1995) with Sarah Brightman
- I Will Be with You (Where the Lost Ones Go) (Pokémon 10: The Rise of Darkrai) (2007) with Sarah Brightman
- The Phantom of the Opera (Symphony: Live in Vienna) (2008) with Sarah Brightman
- Mitten Ins Herz (2008) with Nicole
- Make Me an Offer (2009) with Lindy Bingham
