= Rick Lloyd =

British composer and musical director

Rick Lloyd is a British composer and musical director best known as a member of the original Flying Pickets who had a Christmas number one hit in 1983 with a cover of Yazoo's "Only You". Although the Flying Pickets are known for making a cappella covers of other people's songs, the original songs on their 1984 album Lost Boys were written by Rick Lloyd including the track "Wide Boy".

== Biography and career ==
Lloyd was born in London in 1947, during his time at Aberystwyth University, he joined the Welsh-language four-piece rock band Y Blew of which he was the lead guitarist.

From 1971–1973, he was signed as writer to United Artistes Music (London).

In 1977, he wrote, arranged and performed in the Comedy Rock Musical "Sailing Down Everest" which ran at the Roundhouse Downstairs in London for 10 days in June 1977, directed by Paul Felber and co-written by Rob Leach.

Rick used the pseudonym Ricky Rocket. He hired Kinks backing singer Shirley Roden to play the teacher, one of the main parts.

Paul played Bruce, the main character, as well as directing. Lights and projections by Paul Davidson and Peter Shelton, set design by Paul Dart.

In 1981, Rick collaborated with the author Sue Townsend on a musical based on the life of Daniel Lambert.

He composed "Dives in Omnia" for the 1987 Channel 4 series Porterhouse Blue, starring David Jason, which led to him becoming the joint winner of the 1987 BAFTA TV Award for Best Original TV Music. He also composed the music for John Burrows' Viva Espana, which won Best Musical at the 1993 London Fringe Awards.

He was musical director for the 1999 film Julie and the Cadillacs, and was also musical director for tours of Grease, The Rocky Horror Show and Hair.

Other collaborations with John Burrows include the play One Big Blow about a group of miners in a colliery brass band. This was originally performed by John McGrath's 7:84 Theatre Company. The score was entirely acapella and the production was the meeting place for The Flying Pickets.

He is currently based in Wales where, as well as composing, recording and performing with his own bands – The Hornettes, The Boogilators and the Ric Lloyd Trio - he teaches courses in songs and songwriting. In addition his company Cleftec specializes in music engraving and music preparation.
