= Disco Down =

Disco Down may refer to one of the following:

- "Disco Down", a single by Shed Seven from Going for Gold
- "Disco Down", a song by Kylie Minogue from Light Years
- "Disco Down", a song by The Flying Pickets from Lost Boys
