= Alan Parsons Live =

Alan Parsons Live / The Very Best Live

Live album by Alan Parsons
- Released: 1994 (EU); 1995 (worldwide)
- Recorded: May 1994–February 1995
- Genre: Progressive rock
- Length: 57:10 (EU); 74:40 (USA/Canada)
- Label: Arcade Records (EU); RCA Victor/BMG (elsewhere)
- Producer: Alan Parsons

Alan Parsons chronology
Try Anything Once (1993)	Alan Parsons Live / The Very Best Live (1994)	On Air (1996)

Professional ratings
Review scores
Source	Rating
AllMusic	2.5/5 stars

Alan Parsons Live is the first live album by Alan Parsons, recorded in May 1994 during his European tour, and released late that year by Arcade Records in Europe. RCA/BMG added three new studio tracks and changed the cover art when releasing the album in the rest of the world in 1995, renaming it The Very Best Live; stylized on the cover with "The Very Best" in a smaller font between Alan Parsons and Live. Despite the tour promoting Try Anything Once with seven songs from the album in the setlist, the live performances on the album are all songs from his years with The Alan Parsons Project.

Project regulars Ian Bairnson, Andrew Powell, Stuart Elliott and Richard Cottle anchor the band with Parsons, Gary Howard (Freudiana) and ex-Manfred Mann's Earth Band vocalist Chris Thompson (Try Anything Once) providing vocals for the live tracks.

The album is notable for instrumental track "Luciferama" (a blending of "Lucifer" and "Mammagamma" that first appeared on Andrew Powell's 1983 instrumental album The Philharmonia Orchestra Plays The Best of The Alan Parsons Project, was played like this at the Project's Night of the Proms live performance in 1990 and remains in Parsons' live set to this day); "When", another Parsons songwriting contribution by Bairnson, sung by Thompson; "Take the Money and Run", the second songwriting and first lead vocal contribution to a Parsons album by Elliott; and Thompson's first non-demo studio recording of his co-composition "You're The Voice", a song first recorded and released by John Farnham in 1986.

It is also the only Parsons live album that contains a full rendition of "The Raven" with the vocoder part. The track is prefaced by the second part of "A Dream Within a Dream" (uncredited on the album; bootlegs show that the Orson Welles introduction from the 1987 remix of Tales of Mystery and Imagination was used as an opening tape, but edited out of the official release). Later performances opt for segueing "Breakdown" into the second half of "The Raven".

== Reception ==
Despite rating the album 2.5 stars out of 5 for AllMusic, reviewer Mike DeGagne praised "When" for "being the catchiest of the trio" of the new songs, as well as the "explosiveness" of the live performances, especially on "Prime Time" and "Standing on Higher Ground", "which both sound livelier than the album versions". He further praised the "fresh and crisp" sound throughout, and concluded, "The stellar execution of the songs played live on this album proves that the group - which remained shy of the spotlight - should have toured more frequently."

Mark Jenkins, reviewing the album for The Washington Post prior to a joint Parsons concert with Kansas, had equal criticism of his keyboard-oriented rock as "rather prim and a bit stiff; it betrays little of the spontaneity of live performance," yet praise for its being "less bombastic than much British art-rock" as well as "a cunning balance between mainstream and snob appeal." Jennings concluded that "slick, tame adult-rock may be out of vogue, but "Live" shows that its melodic quotient is undiminished."

== Track listing (EU edition) ==
All songs written by Alan Parsons and Eric Woolfson.

No.	Title	Vocals	Length
1.	"Sirius"	Instrumental	2:25
2.	"Eye In The Sky"	Gary Howard	4:55
3.	"Luciferama"	Instrumental	4:56
4.	"Old and Wise"	Gary Howard	4:49
5.	"Psychobabble"	Chris Thompson	5:22
6.	"The Raven"	Alan Parsons (first verse, vocoder), Gary Howard (second verse) and Chris Thompson (finale)	5:39
7.	"Time"	Gary Howard	5:08
8.	"You're Gonna Get Your Fingers Burned"	Chris Thompson	4:18
9.	"Prime Time"	Gary Howard	5:15
10.	"Limelight"	Chris Thompson	4:40
11.	"Don't Answer Me"	Gary Howard (first verse), Chris Thompson (second verse)	4:13
12.	"Standing on Higher Ground"	Chris Thompson	5:30

== Track listing (US and Canada) ==
All songs written by Parsons and Woolfson, except as indicated.

Side 1
1. Sirius - 2:25
2. Eye In The Sky - 5:04
3. Psychobabble - 5:31
4. The Raven - 5:58
5. Time - 5:19
6. Luciferama - 5:04
7. Old And Wise - 4:52
8. You're Gonna Get Your Fingers Burned - 4:27

Side 2
9. Prime Time - 5:28
10. Limelight - 4:48
11. Don't Answer Me - 4:28
12. Standing On Higher Ground - 5:17
13. When (Bairnson) - 4:15
14. Take The Money And Run (Elliott, Powell) - 6:18
15. You're The Voice (Andy Qunta, Chris Thompson, Keith Reid, Maggie Ryder) - 5:06

== Personnel ==
- Jeremy Meek – Bass, backing vocals (1–12)
- Felix Krish – Bass (13–15)
- Chris Thompson – Vocals (live, 13, 15)
- Gary Howard – Vocals (live)
- Stuart Elliott – Drums; Vocals (14)
- Ian Bairnson – Lead guitar, assistant producer
- Richard Cottle – Keyboards, saxophone
- Andrew Powell – Keyboards
- Alan Parsons – Producer, Mixer, Backing Vocals, Keyboards, Rhythm guitar

Technical

- Artwork – Julien Mills
- Tour coordinator – Keith Morris
- Design – Peter Curzon, Storm Thorgerson
- Layout (EU edition) – Myosotis
- Cover (non-EU editions) – Jon Crossland, Peter Curzon, Storm Thorgerson
- Management – Pete Smith, Isis Music
- Mastering – Simon Heyworth
- Photography – Paul Maxon, Storm Thorgerson
- Live Engineering – Bill Irving, Gary Bradshaw
- Recorded Digitally on Tascam DA-88s using Audio Technica Microphones.
- Mastered at Chop'em Out.
- Recorded on tour in Europe in May 1994.
- Live Postproduction at Parsonics, Sussex, October 1994.
- Tracks 13–15 Recorded and mixed at Parsonics, February 1995.
