= Radio (Wise Guys album) =

Studio album by Wise Guys
- Released: May 5, 2006
- Recorded: Pavement Sound Studio, Bergisch Gladbach; Jacobs Studios, Farnham, England
- Genre: A cappella
- Length: 60:55
- Language: German
- Label: Pavement Records
- Producer: Uwe Baltrusch, Daniel Dickopf, Edzard Hüneke

Wise Guys chronology
Wo der Pfeffer wächst (2004)	Radio (2006)	Frei (2008)

Radio is the ninth album of the German a cappella group Wise Guys. It is built in the form of a radio broadcast: between each individual piece come jingles and other small tidbits, such as the news or sports. This stands as the first concept album of the Wise Guys. The CD ranked #3 in the German album charts and stood for fifteen weeks in the top 100 of the charts.

Like its predecessor Wo der Pfeffer wächst, the CD is purely a cappella with no instrumentation and, with the sole exception of the "Mad World" cover, is entirely self-composed numbers. The majority of the songs were composed by Daniel Dickopf.

== Extra features ==
If one plays a few minutes after the last song on the CD, "Zwischenbilanz", one can find a so-called hidden track that plays for three minutes and thirty seconds; it is essentially a snippet from one of their concert performances ("Kein Ohrwurm").

== List of tracks ==
Those entries marked with (A) are jingles and news bulletins.

1. "(A) Jingle A"
2. "Radio"
3. "(A) Jingle B"
4. "Denglisch"
5. "Jetzt und Hier"
6. "Das bedeutet Krieg"
7. "Sie bricht mir das Herz"
8. "(A) Die Nachrichten" - The News: a short funny news report
9. "Buddy Biber"
10. "Das fremde Wesen" *
11. "Romanze"
12. "(A) Klatsch und Tratsch" - Gossip: a parody on boulevard magazines
13. "Das Allerletzte"
14. "Tiefgang"
15. "(A) Der Sport" - Sports: a short sport news report
16. "Aber sonst gesund"
17. "Ruf doch mal an '06" **
18. "Mad World" ***
19. "Ja ja"
20. "Wir hatten den Moment"
21. "(A) Das Horoskop" - Horoscope
22. "Schunkeln"
23. "Ständchen"
24. "Zwischenbilanz"

* The song "Das fremde Wesen" includes a guest singer, Sonja Wilts from the group LaLeLu. She sings a duet piece with Eddi.
** The piece "Ruf doch mal an '06" is the new version of a song already extent on the 1997 album "Alles im grünen Bereich".

*** The cover of "Mad World" is borrowed from the version of the song that Gary Jules sings. The original is from Tears for Fears.

== Charts ==
Chart (2006)	Position
German Albums (Offizielle Top 100)	3

== Certifications ==
During 2012, Radio was certified Gold in Germany.
