= Y Blew =

Welsh rock band

- Origin: Aberystwyth, Wales
- Genres: Welsh language rock/pop
- Years active: 1967
- Label: Qualiton
- Past members: Maldwyn Pate; Rick Lloyd; Dafydd Evans; Dave Williams; Geraint Evans; Nigel Cole

Y Blew (The Hairs) was a Welsh rock band founded in 1967. Although short lived, having pressed and released just one single, the band are recognized as the first rock band to sing in Welsh.

Formed in 1967 by five students from the University of Aberystwyth: Maldwyn Pate (vocals), Richard Lloyd (lead guitar), Dafydd Evans (bass guitar), Dave Williams (keyboards) and Geraint Evans (drums). The band took their name ("The Hairs" in English) from the long-haired fashion that was popular at the time.

The band raised £2,000 to support their recording and touring, and played their first gig in the Memorial Hall at Talybont at Easter 1967. The band took their music on the road that year with three tours, including playing at the National Eisteddfod in Bala.

In summer 1967 they released their one and only single, Maes B. The band ensured their gigs were well publicised, and as well as distinctive posters and flyers they used billboards to advertise themselves. Despite disbanding in the autumn of that year, their place in Welsh music history was secured and artefacts by the band are now in the possession of the National Library of Wales and Amgueddfa Cymru – Museum Wales.

== Formation ==
During the early 20th century, music in the Welsh language was still largely influenced by male voice choirs, chapel and traditional Noson Lawen singing. The pop music that did exist in Welsh was generally light acoustic folk music having little in common with the current fashions in Anglo-American pop and rock releases.

As social attitudes changed during the 1950s and 1960s, the outlook of many younger Welsh speakers also started to change. Following the outcry over the destruction of Welsh speaking villages to build projects such as dam supplying water for cities in England there was an upsurge of support for Welsh issues and the language. Cymdeithas yr Iaith Gymraeg (Welsh Language Society) a protest movement campaigning for legal recognition of Welsh was established. It was also widely realised that the Welsh language culture needed to renew itself in order to make it relevant to younger generations.

Mae eisiau i bobol sgrechian mewn Cymraeg sâl
We need to get people to scream in bad Welsh – Y Blew

"Y Blew's aim was to reach the Welsh speakers and non Welsh speakers who weren't into politics and start a Welsh language scene", according to Dafydd Evans, one of the founders, in an interview in 1986.

Maldwyn Pate had tried to start a Welsh language band 'Y Pedwar Cainc' in 1966 with fellow Aberystwyth students but their only performance in Aberafan had not gone down well with an audience surprised to hear amplified instruments. The following year, 1967, Y Blew were formed. Following a successful performance to Aberystwyth students they were invited to play in Talybont by Robat Gruffudd, founder of Y Lolfa publishing house. This too was a success and the band decided to spend the summer on tour.

== Tours ==
Poster for Y Blew, at Talybont Memorial Hall, Friday, 7 July 1967. Five shillings entry price

The band self-promoted three highly successful tours of south Wales, attempting to ensure the most professional organization they could. The first in June, the second in July and the third August–September. At the time it was not possible to hire PA systems or vans – the group having to obtain substantial loans to buy equipment and their own van. The band also paid 'bouncers' rather than the usual practice in Welsh language events of relying on friends or volunteers. Large advertising hoardings were booked and thousands of flyers with the slogan "Mae'r Blew yn dod" (Y Blew are coming) were distributed.

The gigs were often attended by the young people of a small town or village, coming to see the new phenomenon of a band singing in Welsh. Following one gig, the band found that messages in lipstick had been written all over their van by enthusiastic female fans.

Not having time to compose 25 or so new songs for the tours, the band translated current popular hits:

We did covers from Sergeant Pepper translated into Welsh, we even did 'San Francisco' by Scott McKenzie in Welsh, and some by Cream, that sort of thing and some of our own, particularly stuff that gave the guitarist Richard Lloyd a chance. He was a quite a good player, the style at the time was to stand right up to the amp to get feedback – Dafydd Evans

== Bala Eisteddfod, 1967 ==
The band's only performance north of Corris was at the 1967 Eisteddfod festival in Bala. The festival site was divided into Maes A (A field), Maes B (B field), Maes C etc. with the young people camping on 'Maes B' where the band set up a performance, bringing the spirit of psychedelia to an otherwise traditional festival.

== Band split ==
The band performed up until Christmas 1967 before splitting up at the end of the year, the various members going their own ways. Singer Maldwyn Pate going to New York to be a choreographer, guitarist Rick Lloyd eventually became a member of the a cappella group The Flying Pickets who had a Christmas number one hit in 1983 in the UK Singles Chart with their cover of Yazoo's track 'Only You'.

Following the end of the Y Blew, it took almost five years for the next Welsh language rock groups to be formed – with Brân and Edward H. Dafis in 1972-3.

I think it took time for the penny to drop. The ethos of Welsh speakers was based on 'Peralau Tâf', 'Y Peldyrau' (acoustic folk bands) ... that's the sort of thing that went at that time. – Dafydd Evans interviewed in 1986.

== "Maes B" single ==

Y Blew were invited to record a single with Cambrian Records whose usual output was male voice choirs, acoustic folk and traditional music. However, the band were of the opinion that the Cambrian's one-track recording studio would not be suitable. Instead they accepted an offer from Pontardawe based Qualiton as they were able to offer the use of the BBC studio in Swansea.

The song on A side of the single "Maes B" takes its name from the field at the Eisteddfod where the band had played. The lyrics, however, make no direct mention of the event. The lyrics reflect the psychedelic influence of pop songs of the era with lines such as: pam 'na nei di ddod 'da fi i weld y tylwyth teg a chael clywed cloc y dref yn taro tair ar ddeg (why not come with me to see the fairies and hear the town clock strike thirteen)

The song "Maes B" was written the evening prior to the recording by Dave Williams (keyboards) with suggestions from Maldwyn Pate (vocals). Dave Williams's main interest at the time being Tamla Motown is clearly heard in the drum intro. "Maes B" and the song on the other side of the record were both recorded in a matter of hours – the band desperate to get to Aberystwyth for two concerts that same evening. The drummer had not heard the song before going into the studio. On the record Maldwyn Pate can be heard to sing 'Snos' rather than 'Nos' (night) but there was no time to re-record a corrected version.

The group where hoping for a heavier, more contemporary sound, similar to Cream or "Hey Joe" by Jimi Hendrix a huge hit at the time. Unfortunately for the band limited technology and number of tracks at the BBC Swansea studio curtailed these ambitions.

It is believed that approximately 2,000 singles were pressed. The song received little radio air play, the Welsh language seldom heard on the radio at that time with broadcasting services being almost completely based in London. The single was however played on a panel programme reviewing latest releases on newly launched BBC Radio 1 (Radio 1 started on air in October 1967 a month before 'Maes B' was released). Not surprisingly given the then low status of the Welsh language, the panel were of the opinion that the record was just a strange gimmick.

According to Dafydd Evans They sold quite well in south Wales, but we didn't perform in the north so the sales there were less.

=== Side 2 – "Beth Sy'n Dod Rhyngom Ni" ===
The flip side of the record is "Beth Sy'n Dod Rhyngom Ni (what comes between us)", the Blew's version of Curtis Mayfield's "You Must Believe Me". Y Blew had heard the song on The Spencer Davis Group's The Second Album. Mayfield had originally recorded the song with his trio The Impressions, reaching No. 15 in the U.S. Billboard charts in 1964. The song also appeared on the Impression L.P. People Get Ready.

The Trwynau Coch (Red Noses) recorded a cover version of "Beth Sy'n Dod Rhyngom Ni" on their 1980 L.P. Rhedeg Rhag y Torpidos (Run from the Torpedoes) (1980, SAIN-1186M).

== Tributes and references to "Maes B" ==
Y Blew received little attention in the years following 1967, the Welsh language music scene largely growing form bands such as Brân and Edward H Davis formed some five years later.

In 1986, Cymdeithas yr Iaith Gymraeg published a fanzine 'Hanes y Blew' (history of Y Blew) including a transcription of an in-depth interview recorded with Dafydd Evans. The fanzine also included archive press cuttings and photos.

It was not until 1987 that a TV documentary about the band appeared on S4C. The programme included clips of Y Blew's original TV performances and interviews with the members and fans. At the end of the programme the original line up re-record "Maes B" in a modern studio. Also in 1987 the annual National Eisteddfod festival returned to Bala with a number of radio and magazine articles referring to "Maes B" and Y Blew. It was decided to name the Eisteddfod's rock music stage and campsite 'Maes-B' in honour of the band.

Named after Maes B

- Maes B – The annual National Eisteddfod's rock music stage and nearby campsite is now named Maes-B in honour of the band.
- Maes E – Song by Datblygu released in 1997. The 'E' in question is ecstasy that had been in at the height of its popularity in the 1990s.
- Maes D – The Eisteddfod's pavilion for learners of the language has been named Maes D (the 'D' from Dysgwyr – Learners).
- MaesE.com – a popular Welsh language on line web forum founded in 2002 by Nic Dafis.
- Maes T – An on line database of Welsh language technology terminology

== See also ==
- Maes (eisteddfod)

== Bibliography ==
- Hanes y Blew (History of y Blew). Cymdeithas yr Iaith Gymraeg, Clwyd branch. 1986.
