= John Frost Bridge =

Bridge over the Lower Rhine at Arnhem

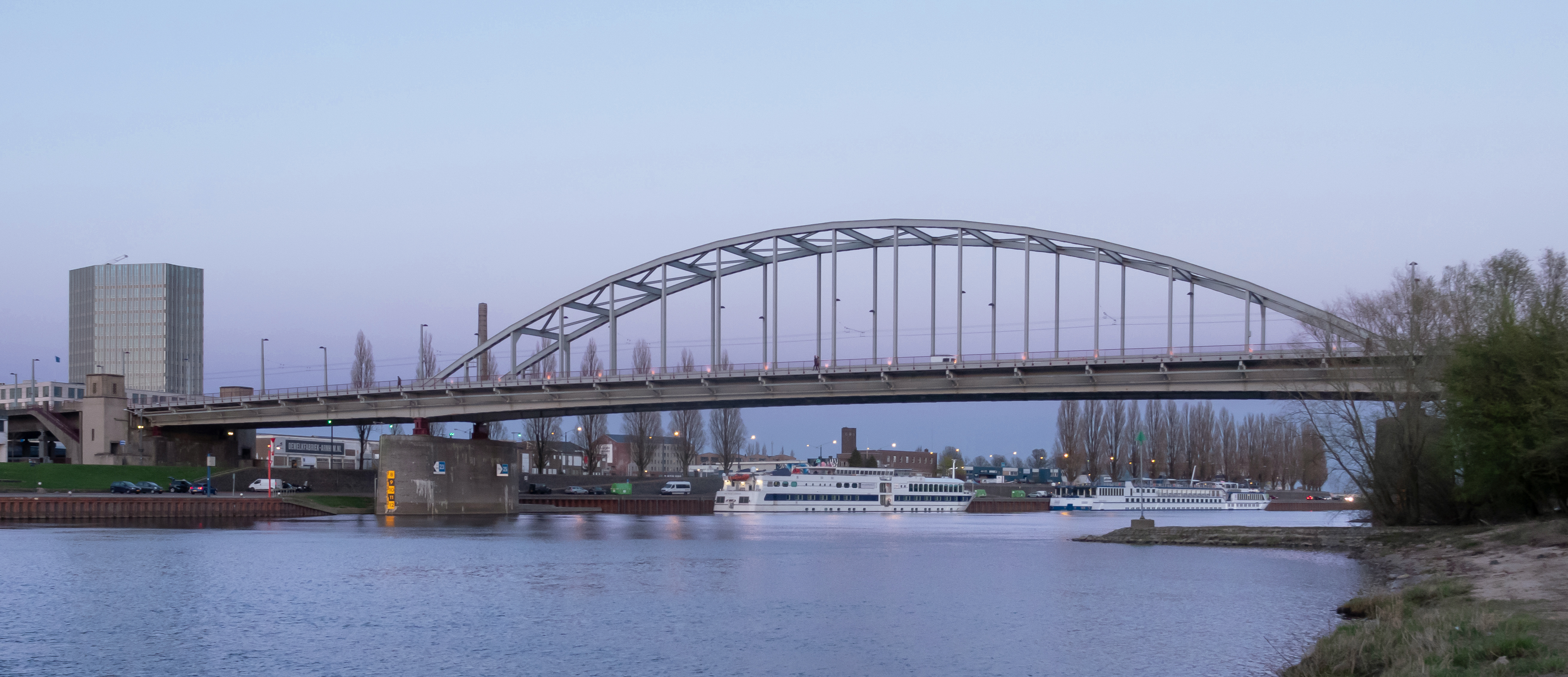
- Coordinates: 51°58′29″N 5°54′43″E
- Crosses: Lower Rhine

History
- Opened: 1948

Location
- Interactive map of John Frost Bridge

John Frost Bridge (John Frostbrug in Dutch) is the road bridge over the Lower Rhine at Arnhem, in the Netherlands. The bridge was inaugurated after the end of World War II, and is named after Major-General John Dutton Frost (1912–1993), who commanded the British forces that reached and temporarily defended the pre-existing Rijnbrug ("Rhine Bridge") at the same location during the Battle of Arnhem in September 1944. This was the bridge referenced in the 1977 Anglo-American film A Bridge Too Far, although the IJssel bridge in Deventer was used for the actual shooting of the film.

== History ==
=== Rijnbrug ===
There had been a floating bridge at Arnhem since 1603 but as the city grew in the early 20th century a permanent link across the Lower Rhine was needed. The Rijnbrug (literally Rhine bridge) was constructed between 1932 and 1935, but was destroyed by Dutch engineers in 1940 to slow the German advance during the invasion of the Netherlands. The Germans had need of the bridge however, and a pontoon bridge acted as a temporary replacement while the road bridge was repaired. The bridge was finished in August 1944.

=== The Battle of Arnhem ===
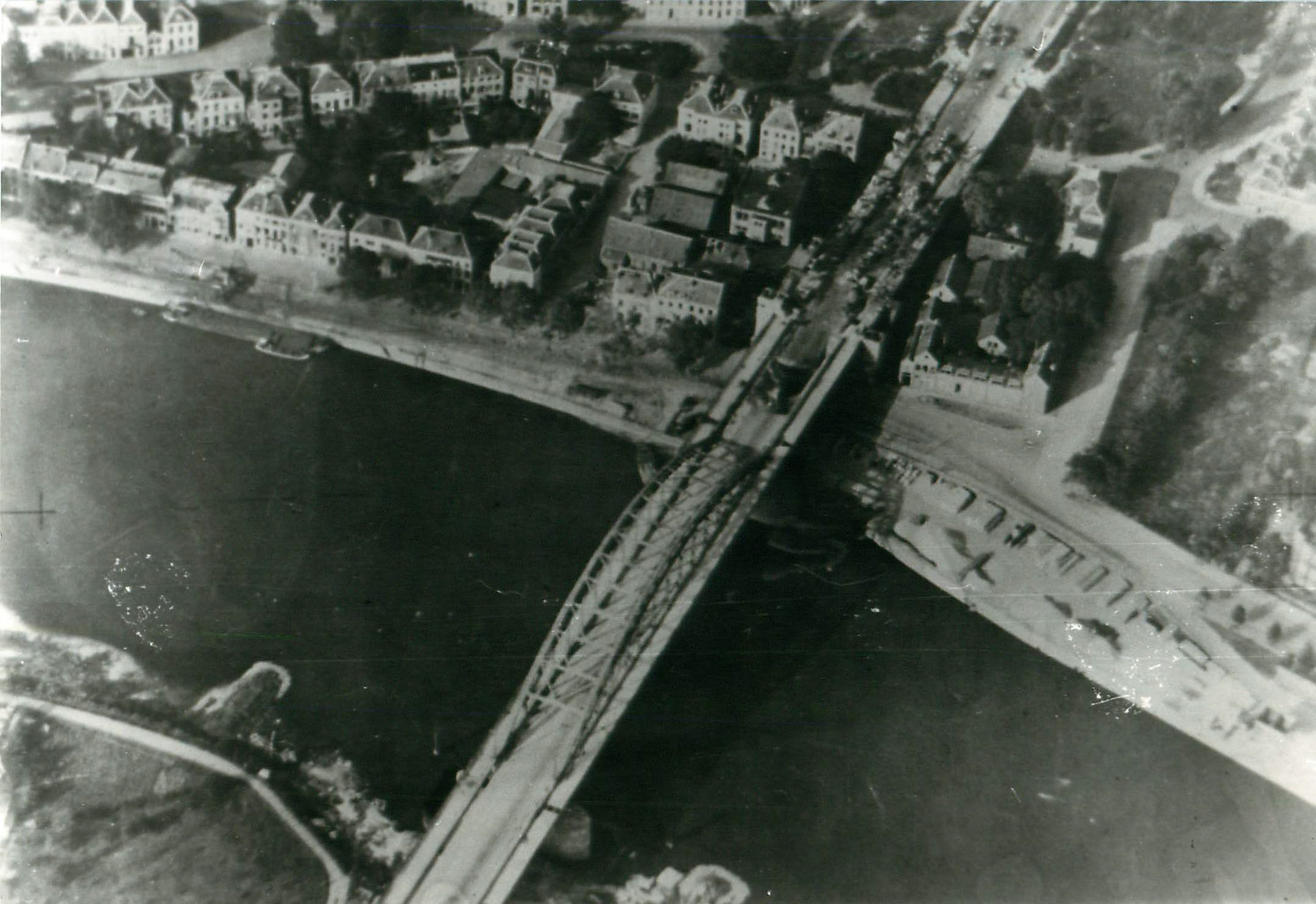
Aerial view of the old bridge during the fighting at Arnhem, September 1944

In September 1944 the Allies launched the military offensive Operation Market Garden. The road bridge across the Lower Rhine should have been the final objective of the operation, and its capture was tasked to the British 1st Airborne Division. Unexpected German resistance in Arnhem meant that only a small force of some 740 men were able to reach the northern end of the bridge, commanded by Lt-Colonel John Frost. On the night of 17 September the British attempted to take the southern end of the bridge, using a flame thrower to destroy German positions in the bridge's towers. This accidentally ignited an ammunition store and the fresh paint on the bridge caught fire, illuminating the area for most of the night and forcing the British to abandon their attempt.

The German forces in Arnhem eventually overwhelmed Frost's men, although this took several days. They had however succeeded in closing the bridge to German armour for some four days, twice as long as a whole division was expected to hold the bridge. The rest of the division held out at nearby Oosterbeek until 25 September before being evacuated across the river.

Although the bridge survived the battle, it was bombed and destroyed by Martin B-26 Marauders of the 344th Bomb Group on 7 October 1944. It was done to prevent the Germans from using it to send reinforcements south of the river during the German counter offensive against the Allied bridgehead.

== John Frostbrug ==
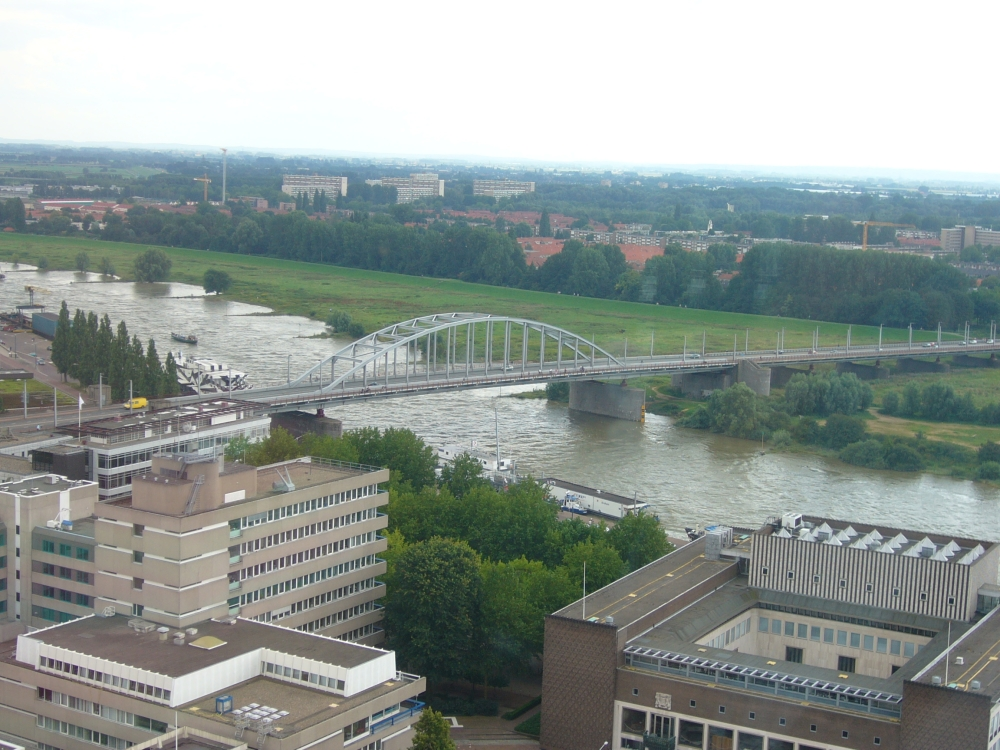
Aerial view from the church tower

Arnhem was captured and liberated in April 1945 and a Bailey bridge was erected alongside the remains of the bridge. The temporary bridge was too low for ships to pass underneath and was replaced by a higher Bailey bridge. Later, a new Rijnbrug was rebuilt in exactly the same style as the destroyed bridge; it opened in 1948. The bridge was depicted in the 1977 film A Bridge Too Far, but because the buildings near the bridge in Arnhem had changed so much since the war, the film was actually shot at Deventer where a similar bridge spans the IJssel.

The Arnhem road bridge was officially renamed the John Frostbrug on 17 December 1977.

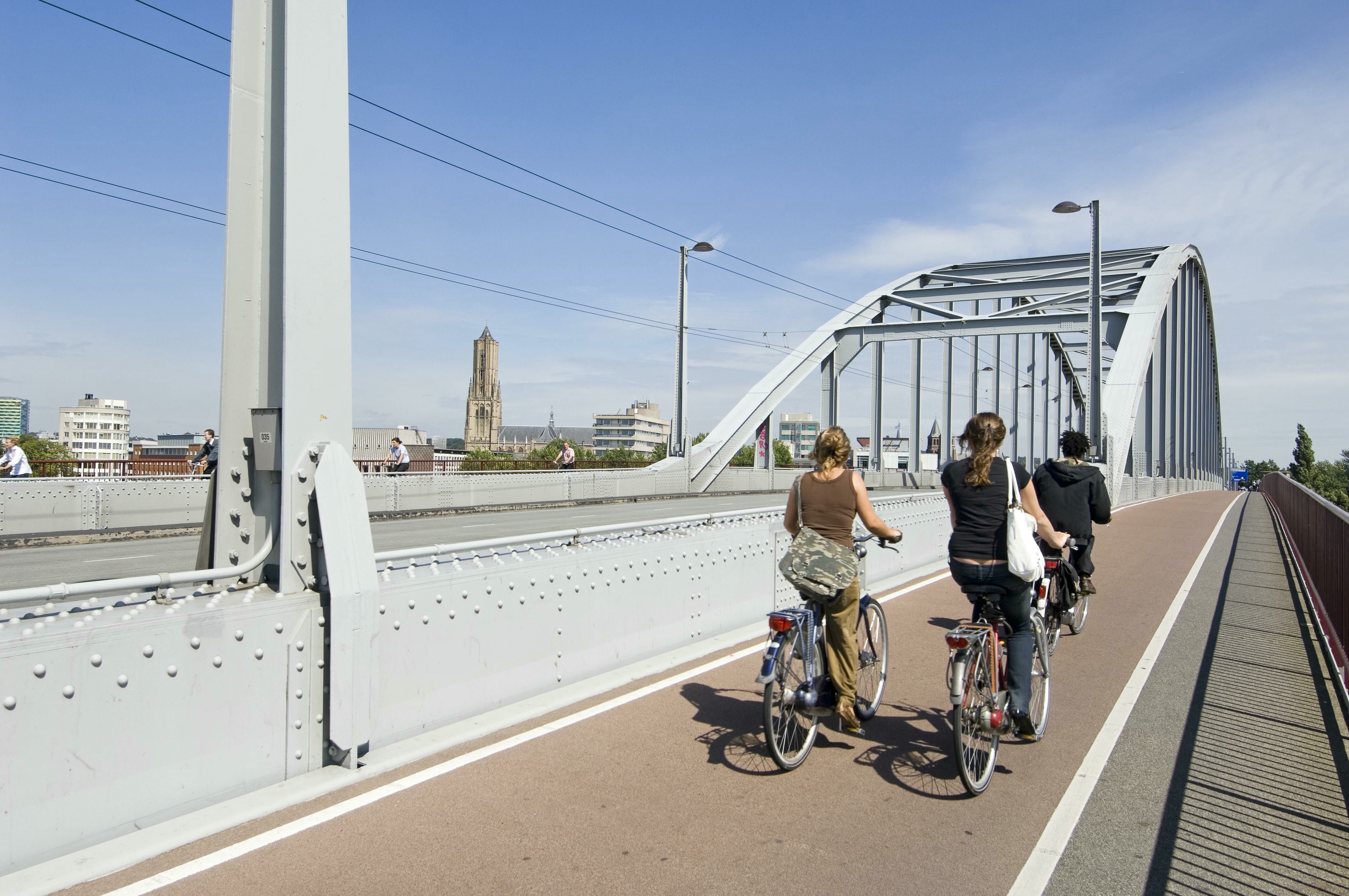
The Fietspad or Bicycle Path on the bridge.

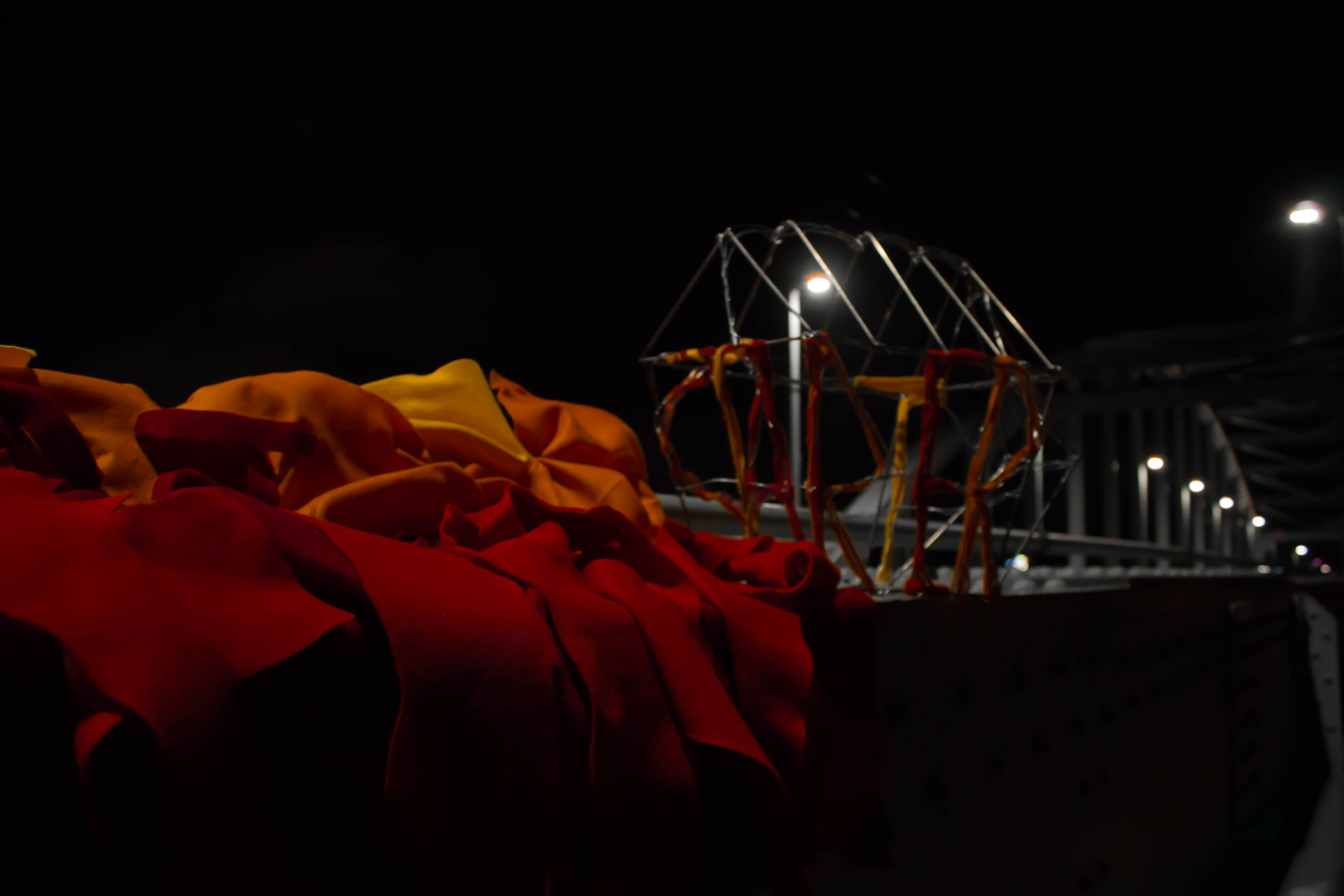
The Between-Fire-Starter art installation

On 8 May 1995 the World Liberty Concert was held at the bridge in honour of the 50th anniversary of the liberation of Europe. It was one of the largest memorial concerts ever held in the Netherlands.

== Other bridges at Arnhem ==
Arnhem has three bridges over the Lower Rhine: the John Frost Bridge, the Nelson Mandela Bridge and the Andrei Sakharov Bridge. There are plans for a new bridge over the Lower Rhine at Oosterbeek, to be named after Stanisław Sosabowski, the Polish general who also fought in the Battle of Arnhem.
