= The Flying Pickets discography =

- Studio albums: 12
- Live albums: 3
- Compilation albums: 2
- Singles: 10

This is the discography of the British a cappella vocal group the Flying Pickets.

The group had a Christmas number one hit in 1983 in the UK Singles Chart with their cover of Yazoo's track "Only You".

== Albums ==
=== Studio albums ===
Title	Album details	Peak chart positions					Certifications	Singers
Title	Album details	UK	AUT	BEL	GER	SWE	Certifications	Singers
Lost Boys	Released: 1984; Label: Virgin	11	—	—	44	19	UK: Silver	Rick Lloyd, David Brett, Ken Gregson, Brian Hibbard, Red Stripe, Gareth Wiliams
Waiting for Trains	Released: 1987	—	—	—	—	—		Rick Lloyd, David Brett, Ken Gregson, Gary Howard, Hereward Kaye, Gareth Wiliams
At Work	Released: 1989	—	—	—	—	—		Rick Lloyd, David Brett, Ken Gregson, Gary Howard, Hereward Kaye, Gareth Wiliams
Blue Money	Released: 1990; Label: Hey-U	—	17	—	—	—		Nick Godfrey, David Brett, Lex Lewis, Gary Howard, Hereward Kaye, Gareth Wiliams
The Warning	Released: 1992; Label: PMF	—	—	—	—	—		Nick Godfrey, Ricky Paine, Michael Henry, Gary Howard, Hereward Kaye
The Original Flying Pickets: Volume 1	Released: 1994; Label: Warner Music Group	—	—	—	—	—		David Brett, Ken Gregson, Brian Hibbard, Red Stripe, Gareth Wiliams
Politics of Need	Released: 1996; Label: Alora Music	—	—	—	—	—		Henrik Wager, Hamlet Edwards, Paul Kissaun, Gary Howard, Hereward Kaye
Vox Pop	Released: 1998; Label: Alora Music	—	—	49	—	—		Henrik Wager, Fraser Collins, Paul Kissaun, Gary Howard, Hereward Kaye
Everyday	Released: 2005; Label: In-Akustik	—	—	—	—	—		Michael Henry, Andrea Figallo, Andy Laycock, Simon Foster, Dylan Foster
Big Mouth	Released: 2008; Label: In-Akustik	—	—	—	—	—		Michael Henry, Andrea Figallo, Andy Laycock, Simon Foster, Damion Scarcella
Only Yule	Released: 2010; Label: In-Akustik	—	—	—	—	—		Michael Henry, Andrea Figallo, Andy Laycock, Simon Foster, Damion Scarcella
Strike Again	Released: 2015; Label: The Company Presents	—	—	—	—	—		Michael Henry, Chris Brooker, Andy Laycock, Simon Foster, Martin George
Only Human	Released: 2018; Label: The Company Presents	—	—	—	—	—		Chris Brooker, Andy Laycock, Simon Foster, Martin George, Henrik Wager

=== Compilation albums ===
Title	Album details
Only You: The Best of The Flying Pickets	Released: 1991; Label: Virgin VIP

=== Live albums ===
Title	Album details	Peak chart positions	Certifications	Singers
Title	Album details	UK	Certifications	Singers
Live at the Albany Empire	Released: 1982; Label: AVM	48	UK: Silver	
Live	Released: 1985; Label: Virgin EMI	—		
Next Generation: Live in Hamburg	Released: 2003; Label: FP Records	—		Michael Henry, Dylan Foster, Andy Laycock, Henrik Wager, Andrea Figallo
"—" denotes items that did not chart or were not released in that territory.

=== Other albums featuring The Flying Pickets ===
- Freudiana (1990)

The last Alan Parsons Project album, which was released simply as a solo album by Eric Woolfson. It was soon after adapted into Woolfson's first musical of the same name.

The Flying Pickets sing all the vocals on two tracks, (6) "Funny You Should Say That" and (8) "Far Away From Home."

== Singles ==
Year	Title	Peak chart positions										Certifications	Album
Year	Title	UK	AUT	BEL	CAN	GER	IRE	NED	NZ	SWE	SWI	Certifications	Album
1983	"Only You"	1	3	3	17	1	1	5	9	3	2	UK: Gold	Lost Boys
1984	"When You're Young and in Love"	7	—	—	—	—	5	—	—	—	—		Lost Boys
1984	"So Close"	88	—	—	—	—	—	—	—	—	—		Lost Boys
1984	"Who's That Girl?"	71	—	—	—	—	—	—	—	—	—		Lost Boys
1985	"Only the Lonely"	79	—	—	—	—	—	—	—	—	—		Non-album singles
1985	"Sealed with a Kiss"	132	—	—	—	—	—	—	—	—	—		Non-album singles
1986	"Take My Breath Away"	—	—	—	—	—	—	—	—	—	—		Non-album singles
1987	"Porterhouse Blue"	122	—	—	—	—	—	—	—	—	—		
1991	"Englishman in New York"/"Purple Rain"	—	—	—	—	—	—	—	—	—	—		Blue Money
1992	"Tainted Love"/"The Warning"	—	—	—	—	—	—	—	—	—	—		The Warning
1994	"Under the Bridge"	80	—	—	—	—	—	—	—	—	—		The Original Flying Pickets: Volume 1
"—" denotes items that did not chart or were not released in that territory.
