= Wise Guys (band) =

German a cappella group, 1990–2017

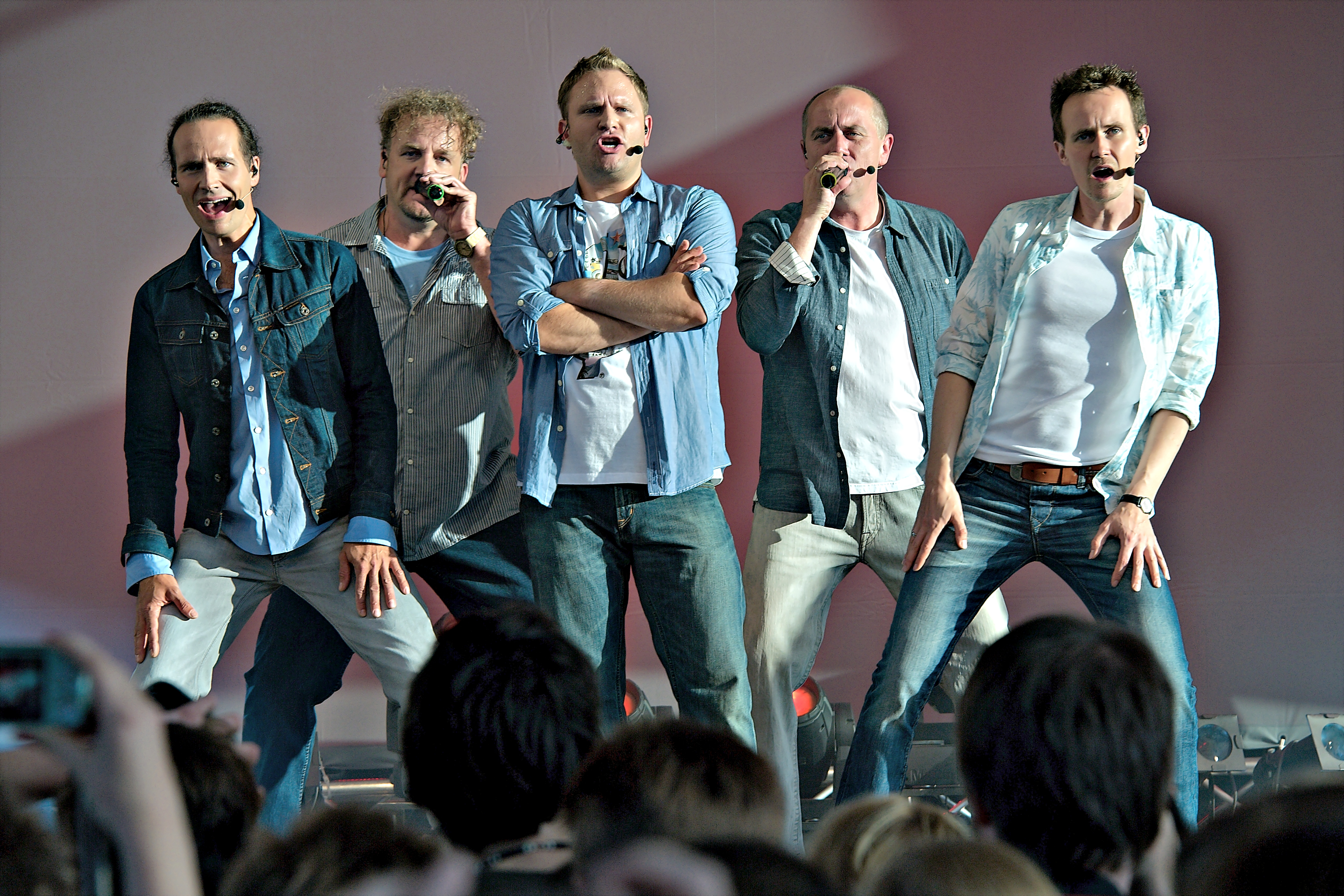
- Wise Guys performing at Tanzbrunnen 2011

Background information
- Origin: Cologne, Germany
- Genres: A cappella, pop
- Years active: 1990–2017
- Labels: EMI, Pavement, Universal Music Group
- Members: Daniel (Dän) Dickopf (1990-2017), Edzard (Eddi) Hüneke (1990-2017), Marc (Sari) Sahr (1990-2017), Björn Sterzenbach (2016-2017), Nils Olfert (2009-2017)
- Past members: Christoph Tettinger (1990-1995), Clemens Tewinkel (1990–2008), Ferenc Husta (1995-2012), Andrea Figallo (2012-2016)

The Wise Guys were a German a cappella band that was formed in 1990 in Cologne, Germany and split in 2017.

== History of the group ==
Apart from Nils Olfert and Björn Sterzenbach, the members all attended the Hildegard-von-Bingen-Gymnasium in Cologne from 1981 to 1990. With their schoolmates Clemens Tewinkel and Christoph Tettinger, who also founded a brass band with them, they formed a rock band. At a school event, the band performed a single a cappella song.

After graduating from high school with their A-levels (Abitur) in 1990, the group focused on the a cappella genre. They soon named themselves the "Wise Guys". Eddi (Edzard) joined an 18-month alternative service for conscientious objectors in Brussels, which left the group as a quartet. The remaining four joined the Ersten Kölner Barbershop Choir. In early 1994, the group placed third in a Barbershop Quartet competition. However, this type of music was not representative of their later work.

In April 1995, Ferenc Husta joined the group as the bass voice, replacing Christoph Tettinger, who could no longer sing for professional reasons. Christoph Tettinger instead became the group's manager.

After their first album Dut-Dut-Duah! (1994), which was mostly in English along with some cover songs, the band concentrated on German language, rhythm-based compositions. In 1997, the Wise Guys turned professional, and released their third album Alles im grünen Bereich, produced by Uwe Baltrusch. Their following album was with EMI. With their Live-Album (2000), the band moved to Pavement Records.

The usual tours were supplemented by big events such as "Tanzbrunnen", "Totalnacht", and "Spezialnacht", festivals taking place in Cologne. In 2001 they got a world record for the concert on "Tanzbrunnen" (a big area for concerts in Cologne) with 12,500 spectators. Their open-air concerts at the "evangelischer Kirchentag" in 2005, 2007 and 2009 (Protestant church congress) were visited by 35,000, 70,000, and 65,000 viewers respectively.

In 2012, the band released an album in two parts entitled "Zwei Welten". It consisted of an a capella album released in May 2012 and an instrumental album released in September 2012. "Zwei Welten" was also released as a two-disc package with two bonus tracks in December 2012, which brought them to their fifth gold record.

At the end of March 2012, Ferenc Husta decided to leave the group. Andrea Figallo took his place in December 2012. In February 2016, the band published an official statement on their web site announcing that bass singer and producer Andrea Figallo would leave the band in April 2016, and that the group would stop performing altogether in summer 2017. Björn Sterzenbach replaced Andrea Figallo in May 2016.

== Discography ==
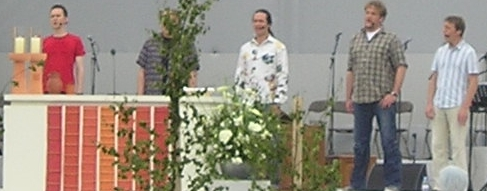
Protestant Church Congress 2007

=== Albums ===
| Year | Title | Chart Positions | | | Produced by |
| Year | Title | DE | AT | CH | Produced by |
|---|---|---|---|---|---|
| 1994 | Dut-Dut-Duah! (Dut-Dut-Duah!) | – | – | – | |
| 1996 | Haarige Zeiten (Difficult Times [lit. Hairy Times]) | – | – | – | |
| 1997 | Alles im grünen Bereich (Everything OK [lit. Everything in the Green Zone]) | – | – | – | Uwe Baltrusch und Hannes Schöner |
| 1999 | Skandal (Scandal) | – | – | – | Uwe Baltrusch |
| 2000 | Live (Live) | 93 | – | – | Uwe Baltrusch |
| 2001 | Ganz weit vorne (two meanings: Right in Front / Really Great) | 49 | – | – | Uwe Baltrusch |
| 2003 | Klartext (Straight Talk) | 10 | – | – | |
| 2004 | Wo der Pfeffer wächst (Long Way Off [lit. Where the Pepper Grows]) | 13 | – | – | Uwe Baltrusch |
| 2006 | Radio (Radio) | 3 | – | – | Uwe Baltrusch |
| 2008 | Frei! (Free!) | 2 | 67 | – | Uwe Baltrusch |
| 2010 | Klassenfahrt (School Trip) | 2 | 48 | – | Uwe Baltrusch |
| 2012 | Zwei Welten – a cappella (Two Worlds - a capella) | 3 | 5 | 45 | Uwe Baltrusch |
| 2012 | Zwei Welten – instrumentiert (Two Worlds - instrumental) | 3 | 5 | 45 | |
| 2012 | Zwei Welten Komplett (Two Worlds Complete) | 64 | 58 | – | Uwe Baltrusch |
| 2013 | Mein Herz macht bumm! (My heart goes boom!) | 36 | – | – | Uwe Baltrusch |
| 2014 | Achterbahn (Roller Coaster) | 2 | – | – | Andrea Figallo |
| 2015 | Läuft bei euch (What's up) | 6 | 22 | – | Andrea Figallo |
| 2016 | Live in Wien (Live in Vienna) | 22 | 58 | – | Andrea Figallo |
| 2016 | Das Beste komplett (The Best complete) | 33 | – | – | |

=== Singles and EPs ===
(Numbers in brackets indicate highest position achieved on the German Music Hits List.)

- 1996 - (Die Frau hat) Rhythmus [--] ([The Woman's Got] Rhythm)
- 1997 - Alles Banane [--] (Everything in Order [lit. It's all Bananas])
- 1999 - Nein, Nein, Nein [--] (No, No, No)
- 2000 - Die Heldensage vom heiligen Ewald [--] (The Heroic Saga of Saint Ewald)
- 2001 - Höher Schneller Weiter (Projektsingle) [--] (Higher, faster, further)
- 2001 - Jetzt ist Sommer [78] (It's Summer Now)
- 2001 - Wenn sie tanzt [--] (When She Dances)
- 2002 - Kinder [--] (Children)
- 2004 - Früher (Mini-Album) [51] (In Past Times)
- 2005 - Weltmeister (Mini-Album) [38] (World Champion)
- 2006 - Klinsi, warum hast du das getan? [published as a single track at the iTunes Music Store] (Klinsi, why did you do this?)
- 2012 - Lauter (Mini-Album) [49] (Louder)
- 2012 - Mach Dein Ding! [--] (Do Your Thing!)
- 2013 - Antidepressivum [88] (Antidepressant)

=== DVDs ===
- 2003 - Wise Guys - die DVD
- 2005 - Wise Guys Spezialnacht Philipshalle Düsseldorf, 6. November 2004
- 2009 - Wise Guys - Live im Capitol
