= David Brett =

English actor and singer

- Born: Coalville, Leicestershire, England
- Occupation(s): Actor, singer, arranger

David Brett is an English actor, singer and arranger. He was one of the original members of The Flying Pickets, and arranged a number of the group's songs, including the number one hit Only You. His work as an actor, mainly on stage, has included Lark Rise to Candleford at the Finborough Theatre, London, but he has also participated in a number of TV productions and played Dedalus Diggle in Harry Potter and the Philosopher's Stone.

Brett appeared in a 1998 London stage adaptation of Terry Pratchett's Guards! Guards! as Corporal Nobbs, who was "disqualified from the human race for pushing."

== Career ==
In 1976 Brett worked for the Mikron Theatre Company and was one of the writers of the play "Puddle It!", the story of the people who built the canals 1761–1827. He also collaborated in writing some of the music and lyrics for the show, along with Antony Burton, John Saxon, Mark Steeves and Ruth Tansey. In the same year, the Mikron Theatre Company also took the play "Up The Cut" on the national waterways tour, in which he also performed .

In 1980 he appeared in the stage production of The Hitchhiker's Guide to the Galaxy at the Rainbow Theatre as Ford Prefect; although not critically acclaimed, this show was well received by HHGTTG aficionados.

Brett is the first of two actors from the Mikron Theatre Company to appear in a Harry Potter film, the other being Mark Williams who appears as Arthur Weasley.
