= Alles im grünen Bereich =

Studio album by Wise Guys
- Released: 1997
- Recorded: April–May 1997
- Genre: A cappella
- Length: 45:25
- Label: EMI
- Producer: Uwe Baltrusch

Wise Guys chronology
Haarige Zeiten (1996)	Alles im grünen Bereich (1997)	Skandal (1999)

Alles im grünen Bereich (Everything OK [lit. Everything in the Green Zone]) is the third album of the German-speaking a cappella group Wise Guys. It was released in 1997 and is the first album by the group under the EMI label and with producer Uwe Baltrusch. Except for the last two songs, everything is the work of Daniel Dickhopf and Edzard Hüneke.

Recording was done in April and May 1997. Some songs were only completed during the recordings, as the previous album came out only a year and a half before.

Musically the album is an advancement for the group because different facets of a cappella music and vocal percussion dominate the songs.

== Remaster ==
In 2010, EMI Music published a remastered version, containing an additional song "Total egal". The band reacted angrily, as they were no longer under contract with the label and had not been informed of the new release. They accused the record company of attempting to share in the success of the album Klassenfahrt, especially since this CD is also sold with the publication date of 2010.

== Track list ==
1. "Wise Guys Opener" – 3:00
2. "Ruf doch mal an" – 3:38
3. "Alles im grünen Bereich" – 2:35
4. "Ich schmeiß' mein Auto auf den Müll" – 2:43
5. "Wie kann es sein" – 2:39
6. "Schwachkopf" – 4:04
7. "Julia" – 1:11
8. "Ich bin raus" – 3:18
9. "Dumm gelaufen" – 3:04
10. "Tekkno" – 1:24
11. "Köln ist einfach korrekt" – 3:21
12. "Alles Banane" – 2:51
13. "Haarige Zeiten" – 2:58
14. "Wie die Zeit vergeht" – 2:55
15. "(Die Frau hat) Rhythmus" – 2:35
16. "Ich will keine a cappella" – 1:49 (Music and text: Jack Morrow / special text: Daniel Dickopf)
17. "Lullaby (Goodnight, My Angel)" – 3:20 (Music and text: Billy Joel)
18. "Total egal (Live)" – 2:29 (only on the remastered version)
