= Brian Hibbard =

Welsh actor and singer (1946–2012)

Brian Lewis Hibbard
- Born: 26 November 1946; Ebbw Vale, Monmouthshire, Wales
- Died: 17 June 2012 (aged 65); Cardiff, Wales
- Occupations: Actor, singer
- Years active: 1980–2012
- Known for: Founding member of The Flying Pickets
- Children: 3

Brian Hibbard (26 November 1946 – 17 June 2012) was a Welsh actor and singer from Ebbw Vale, Wales, best remembered as the lead vocalist in the original The Flying Pickets.

== Early life and career ==
Hibbard was born into a working class family in Ebbw Vale, Monmouthshire, and had a socialist upbringing. He was educated at Ebbw Vale Grammar School. After various jobs including teacher, steel worker, barman and chimney sweep, he formed The Flying Pickets with a group of other actors who had practised a cappella singing while travelling by coach to their appearances. Their cover version of Yazoo's track "Only You" was the Christmas number one in 1983 on the UK Singles Chart.

Following the group's success, Hibbard pursued a career as a television actor, making a guest appearance in the 1987 Doctor Who story Delta and the Bannermen. His first regular TV role came in 1989, playing petty criminal "Chunky" in three series of Manchester-based comedy drama Making Out (1989-1991), followed by a two-year stint in Coronation Street as garage mechanic Doug Murray. Other soap appearances included brief stints in Emmerdale as Bobby-John Downes, and as Henry Mason, a man who ran a children's home where Billy Mitchell and Julie Perkins were in care, in EastEnders.

Other appearances include Minder, The Armando Iannucci Shows, Satellite City, Welsh language soap Pobol y Cwm as well as the youth drama Pam Fi, Duw? and in the 1997 film Twin Town as the self-styled "Karaoke King" Dai Rees.

== Personal life and death ==
Hibbard and his wife Caroline had three children.

In 2000, Hibbard was diagnosed with prostate cancer; he died of the disease on 17 June 2012 at the age of 65.
