= Gavin Muir (British actor) =

British actor and musician

- Born: Gavin Muir; 15 September 1951; London, UK
- Died: 15 July 2002 (aged 50); London, UK
- Occupation: actor

Gavin Muir (15 September 1951 – 15 July 2002), was a British actor and musician probably best known for his role in the 1983 Television version of Accidental Death of an Anarchist.

Muir trained as a child actor at the Arts Educational School during which he made Radio appearances including work on the Archers. He was very politically active during the 1970s working for a variety of Theatre in Education companies including national touring work with Brian Way, and several years with the Wearabout Theatre Company in Sunderland. As an active member of the Workers Revolutionary Party, he was drawn to the political theatre company Belt and Braces run by Gavin Richards, and appeared in their West End run of Accidental Death of an Anarchist by Dario Fo. He met and married his wife, Teresa, a Northern Irish woman, in 1974. They remained together until his death in 2002.

== Career ==
Muir had small parts in various television programmes including The Bill, Thieftakers, Cracker, Jo Brand and Our Friends in the North. He appeared in films such as Accidental Death of an Anarchist (1983), a small film called Representative Radio in which he played the role of Joseph Goddard and The One And Only in which he played a surgeon (2002). From 21 September 1990 to 5 January 1991 he played the role of an English jockey in the farce Tiercé Gagnant at the 700 seat Théâtre de la Michodière in Paris. The original play, Dry Rot, by John Chapman, featured a French jockey. The adaptation and transposition of the play to France, by Stewart Vaughan and Jean-Claude Islert, required that the nationality of the jockey be reversed. The play was directed by Christopher Renshaw. Muir worked for BBC Radio for many years. He appears as the voice of Rosencrantz in Shakespeare's Hamlet and was the voice of Blacksmith in a TV series called animated tales of the world, in 2000. His theatre work include many years working for such establishments such as Regent's Park Open Air Theatre and The Royal Shakespeare Company. He was an early member of the singing group The Flying Pickets.

== Filmography ==
Year	Title	Role	Notes
1995	The Gnomes' Great Adventure	The Man / The King / Pit	Voice
2001	Representative Radio	Joseph Godard	
2002	The One and Only	Surgeon	(final film role)
