= The Flying Pickets =

British band

- Origin: London, England
- Genre: A cappella
- Years active: 1982–present
- Label: Virgin
- Members: Martin George; Andy Laycock; Simon John Foster; Henrik Wager; Christopher Brooker
- Past members: Brian Hibbard; Ken Gregson; David Brett; Red Stripe; Rick Lloyd; Gareth Williams; Ron Donachie; Christopher Ryan; Dylan Foster; Hereward Kaye; Gary Howard; Nick Godfrey; Lex Lewis; Ricky Payne; Paul Kissaun; Fraser Collins; Andrea Figallo; Damion Scarcella; Mike Henry; Gavin Muir
- Website: www.pickets.co.uk

The Flying Pickets are a British a cappella vocal group which had a Christmas number one hit in 1983 on the UK Singles Chart with their cover version of Yazoo's track "Only You".

== History ==
The band of six was founded by Brian Hibbard in 1982 from a group of actors who had been active with him in John McGrath's 7:84 theatre group, a fringe theatre organisation who had sung a cappella in their production of the 1981 play One Big Blow. The group chose the name the Flying Pickets as band members had played a part in the UK miners' strikes of 1972 and 1974.

Performing in clubs and pubs in London, the Flying Pickets came up with a concept of transferring the art of a cappella to the pop music scene. Joining Hibbard in the group were Rick Lloyd (who also wrote the music to One Big Blow), Gareth Williams, David Brett, Ken Gregson (real name Kenneth Gregory) and Red Stripe (real name David Gittins). The members were internationally renowned for their flamboyant appearance: Hibbard's huge sideburns, Stripe's thick eye-liner, and the others showing off gaudy suits and large hats. Two of the other original members, Ron Donachie and Christopher Ryan, left the band before "Only You".

"Only You", their first single, was the UK Christmas number one in 1983, spending five weeks at the top, and also doing well around Europe and in Canada, where it reached number 17 in spring 1984. It emulated the success of the original Yazoo version. The video was shot in the Red Duster public house in South Shields, Tyne and Wear.

The name Flying Pickets refers to mobile strikers who travel in order to join a picket, reflecting the group's radical socialist political views. The height of the group's fame coincided with the 1984 miners strike, when the National Union of Mineworkers called strike action following the National Coal Board's decision to close 20 pits – a move which claimed some 20,000 jobs. The Flying Pickets were vocal in their support of miners during the dispute and came to blows with the record label Virgin after they picketed Drax Power Station in Yorkshire. They also performed benefit gigs for the miners. Hibbard himself claimed that their political beliefs probably had a detrimental effect on the group's mainstream image but it was a sacrifice they were willing to make; according to the group, one well-known record store refused to sell the group's albums due to their support of strike action.

Despite the group's socialist views, the Conservative Prime Minister Margaret Thatcher proclaimed, to much amusement and scepticism, that "Only You" was her favourite record. A second single, a cover version of Van McCoy's "(When You're) Young and in Love" (originally written for Ruby and the Romantics), reached number 7 in the UK, but their third, a cover of the Eurythmics' "Who's That Girl", barely charted.

In 1986, Hibbard and Stripe left the band and were replaced by Gary Howard and Hereward Kaye. Hibbard and Stripe tried to stay in the music industry, forming their own act called Brian and Stripe, but their first and only single, a cover version of Yazoo's "Mr. Blue", failed to chart, and they returned to their separate acting careers.

In 1987, the Flying Pickets sang the title song (in Latin, Dives in Omnia) and end titles reprise to Porterhouse Blue, in the style of a medieval university drinking-song.

The group sang two songs on the Eric Woolfson/Alan Parsons 1990 album Freudiana.

The Flying Pickets' line-up has changed throughout the years, but the band never died; since the Pickets began, there have been around 27 members. The last member of the original line-up, David Brett, left the band in 1990. However, in 1994, the original line-up (minus Lloyd) reformed to record one more album.

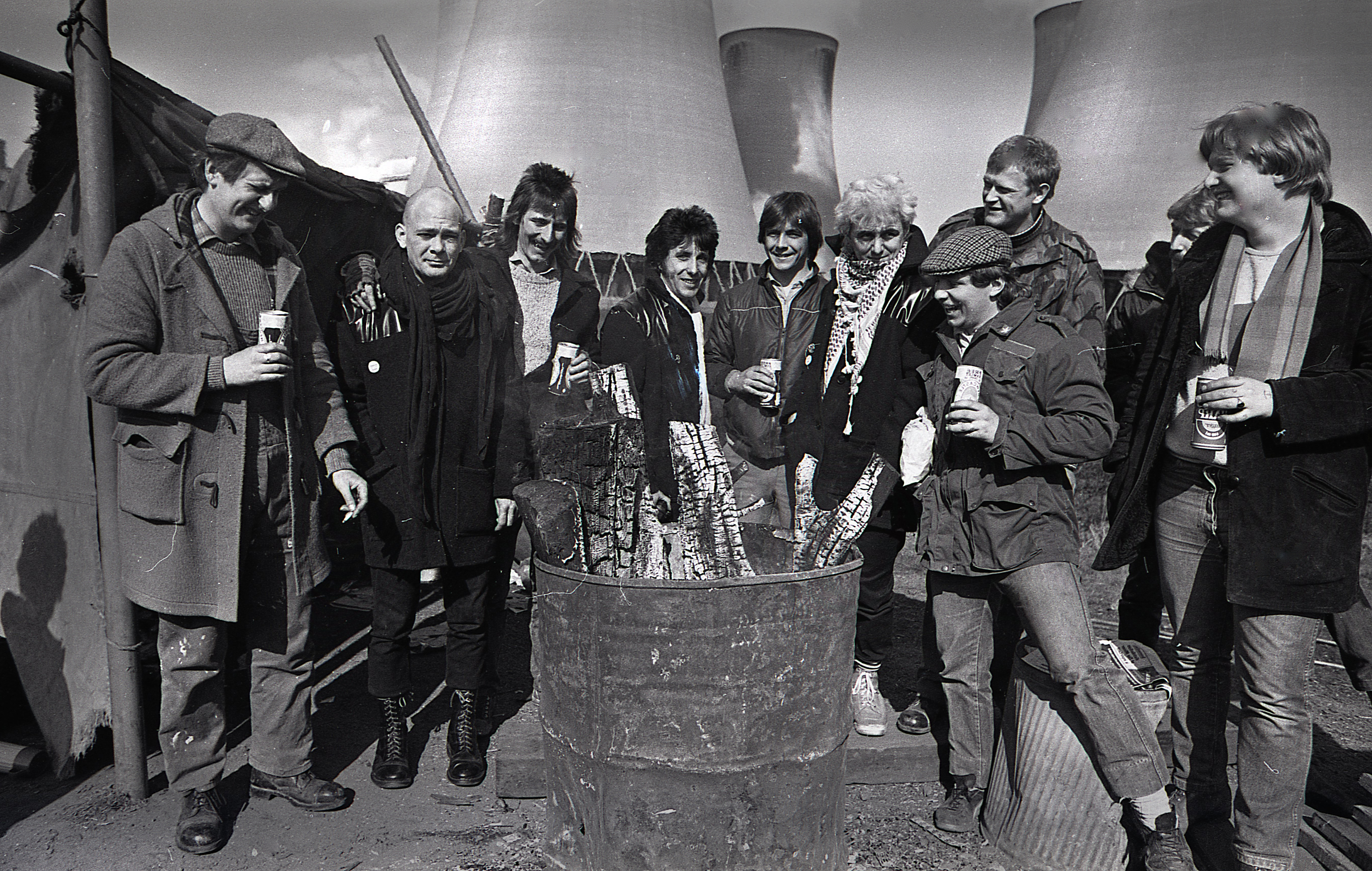
The Flying Pickets supporting the miner's strike, Drax Power Station, 1984

Although none of the founding members have been part of the group since 1990, the Flying Pickets continue to record albums and tour all over Europe and abroad.

== Post-Picket activities ==
Hibbard, the group's founder and lead singer, pursued a career as a television actor, making a guest appearance in the 1987 Doctor Who story Delta and the Bannermen. His first regular TV role came in 1989, playing petty criminal Chunky in three series of Manchester-based comedy drama Making Out (1989–1991), followed by a two-year stint in Coronation Street as garage mechanic Doug Murray. Other appearances include Minder, The Armando Iannucci Shows, Satellite City, Welsh language soap Pobol y Cwm as well as the youth drama Pam Fi, Duw? and in the 1997 film Twin Town as the self-styled "Karaoke King" Dai Rees.

In 2006 Hibbard won the BAFTA Cymru Award for Best Actor for his role as Tony in the film Little White Lies. He died on 17 June 2012.

Brett toured with the English Shakespeare Company and appeared as Mad Mike the Mechanic in the BBC children's TV programme Marlene Marlowe Investigates. In 2000, Brett played the part of Dedalus Diggle in the film Harry Potter and the Philosopher's Stone.

Williams toured in a production of South Pacific and also with The English Shakespeare Company; he played Nathan Detroit in a production of Guys & Dolls. He also worked with Jonathan Miller on a TV adaptation of Henry Mayhew's London Labour, London Poor. In 2009, he understudied and went on for Patrick Stewart in the Theatre Royal Haymarket production of Waiting for Godot.

Gittins worked in bread delivery after leaving the band, then decided to move to Australia where he took a job as a stage mechanist at the Victorian State Theatre. He also co-developed the techno act Poets of the Machine.

Gregson also emigrated to Australia and has made an appearance in the soap Neighbours.

Lloyd was a joint winner of a BAFTA TV Award for his work on the 1987 TV series Porterhouse Blue, and was musical director for the 1999 film Julie and the Cadillacs.

== Members ==
=== Original ===
- Brian Hibbard
- Ken Gregson
- David Brett
- Red Stripe
- Rick Lloyd
- Gareth Williams

=== Present ===
- Andy Laycock
- Simon John Foster
- Henrik Wager
- Christopher Brooker
- Martin George

=== Other past members ===
- Mike Henry
- Andrea Figallo
- James Gibb
- Damion Scarcella
- Dylan Foster
- Hereward Kaye
- Gary Howard
- Nick Godfrey
- Lex Lewis
- Ricky Payne
- Paul Kissaun
- Fraser Collins
- Gavin Muir
- Christopher Ryan
