= Try Anything Once =

1993 studio album by Alan Parsons

Studio album by Alan Parsons
- Released: 26 October 1993
- Recorded: October 1992 – August 1993
- Genre: Progressive rock
- Length: 59:36
- Label: Arista
- Producer: Alan Parsons

Alan Parsons chronology
Freudiana (1990)	Try Anything Once (1993)	On Air (1996)

Singles from Try Anything Once
- 1. "Turn It Up" Released: 1993; 2. "Wine From the Water" Released: 1994 (Europe); 3. "Oh Life (There Must Be More)" Released: 14 February 1994 (US)

Professional ratings
Review scores
Source	Rating
AllMusic	2.5/5 stars
Deseret News	(favorable)
The Times Transcript	4/5 stars

Try Anything Once is the first solo album by Alan Parsons, released in 1993. It was his first album following the split of the Alan Parsons Project.

This album features vocals by Ambrosia's David Pack, Jacqui Copland, former Mindbender and 10cc guitarist Eric Stewart, and Manfred Mann's Earth Band frontman Chris Thompson. The album features completely digital recording and mixing. It was recorded at Parson's first "Parsonics" studio in Sussex England with the orchestra recorded at Air Studios in London.

There is an Easter egg inside the inlay. One of the pictures is a stereogram; when the viewer looks at it correctly, an image of a man and woman upside down will appear, similar to the other pictures in the album's artwork. This image is also on the CD itself.

== Track listing ==
No.	Title	Writer(s)	Lead vocals	Length
1.	"The Three of Me"	David Pack; Andrew Powell	David Pack	5:52
2.	"Turn It Up"	Ian Bairnson	Chris Thompson	6:13
3.	"Wine from the Water"	Alan Parsons; Bairnson	Eric Stewart	5:43
4.	"Breakaway" (instrumental)	Parsons		4:07
5.	"Mr Time"	Stuart Elliott; Jacqui Copland; Rick Driscoll	Jacqui Copland	8:17
6.	"Jigue" (instrumental)	Parsons; Powell		3:24
7.	"I'm Talkin' to You"	Pack; Powell	David Pack	4:38
8.	"Siren Song"	Bairnson; Frank Musker	Eric Stewart	5:01
9.	"Dreamscape" (instrumental)	Parsons		3:01
10.	"Back Against the Wall"	Bairnson	Chris Thompson	4:38
11.	"Re-Jigue" (instrumental)	Parsons; Powell		2:28
12.	"Oh Life (There Must Be More)"	Pack; Parsons	David Pack	6:33

== Personnel ==
- Alan Parsons – synthesizer, acoustic guitar, bass, flute, background vocals, producer
- Ian Bairnson – synthesizer, bass, guitar, pedal steel guitar, background vocals
- Richard Cottle – synthesizer, saxophone
- Andrew Powell – bass, synthesizer, electric piano, autoharp, orchestra director
- Stuart Elliott – drums, synthesizer
- David Pack – synthesizer, guitar, vocals
- Jeremy Parsons – guitar
- Philharmonia Orchestra – strings
- Graham Preskett – fiddle, violin, mandolin
- Eric Stewart – vocals
- Chris Thompson – vocals
- Jacqui Copland – vocals, background vocals

== Charts ==
Chart performance for Try Anything Once
Chart (1993)	Peak position
Dutch Albums (Album Top 100)	64
German Albums (Offizielle Top 100)	78
Swiss Albums (Schweizer Hitparade)	34
US Billboard 200	122
