= Andrea Figallo =

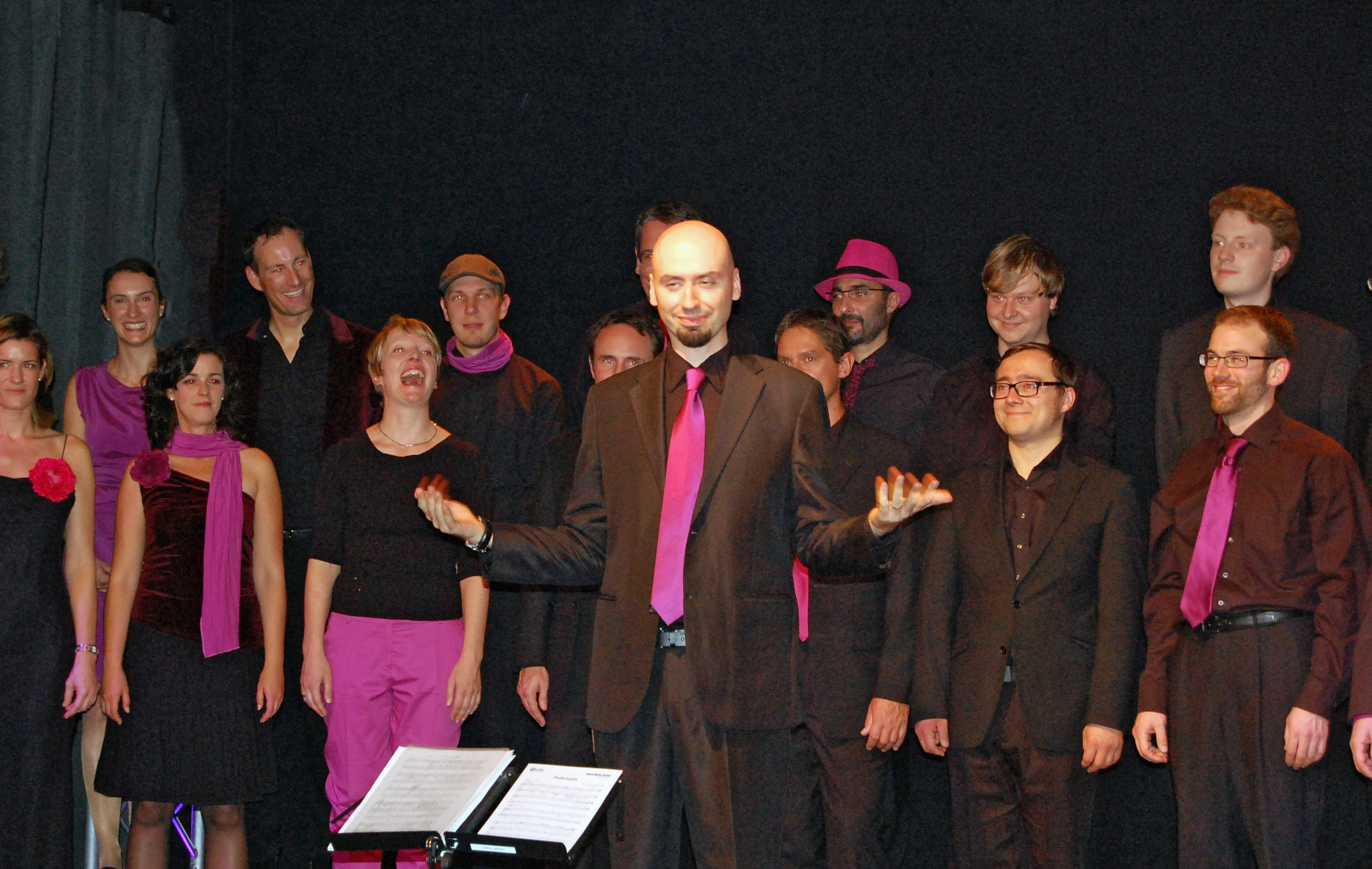
- Figallo singing with the Wise Guys, 2013.

Background information
- Born: 11 February 1972 (age 53); Gorizia, Italy
- Genres: Pop, jazz
- Occupations: Musician, Producer, Conductor, Songwriter
- Instruments: Vocals, vocal percussion
- Years active: 1992–present
- Labels: Universal
- Website: www.andreafigallo.com

Andrea Figallo is an Italian vocal coach, vocalist and producer.

== Career ==
Figallo has been involved for many years in the vocal a cappella music scene, teaching voice, coaching choirs, conducting, arranging, adjudicating vocal contests and holding workshops on many subjects: singing bass, vocal percussion, vocal group singing and all things vocal.

He a member of the Wise Guys (band) and the Flying Pickets. He's also founder of The Ghost Files, a vocal studio project dedicated to original vocal music recordings. He is a freelance conductor working all over Europe. From June 2012 to June 2013 he was the musical director of the choir don camillo chor, Munich.

His original choral music is published by Edition Ferrimontana GmbH and Helbling GmbH.

On 31 October 2012 he was introduced as the new bass singer of the German a capella band Wise Guys and successor of the former bass singer Ferenc Husta. Since the beginning of December 2012 he has been living in Cologne.

In February 2016, the Wise Guys made two important announcements: 1) the decision to disband in July 2017, 2) Andrea would leave the band two months later.

Figallo travels around the world teaching music, coaching choirs, producing recordings and adjudicating choral competitions.

== Discography ==
- Jazz'n Jam, Uno, Tape, 1996, singer, arranger
- Jazz'n Jam, Libera La Fantasia, CD, 1998, producer, singer, arranger
- Flying Pickets, Live in Hamburg, CD, 2001, producer, singer, arranger
- Flying Pickets, Vocal Zone EP, 2002, singer
- Flying Pickets, Everyday, CD, 2004, album producer, singer, arranger, recording engineer
- The Ghost Files, New Folder, CD, 2008, album producer, composer, singer, arranger, recording engineer
- Flying Pickets, Big Mouth, CD, 2008, producer, singer, arranger, recording engineer
- Esmeralda Grao, Sottovoce, CD, 2009, album producer, recording engineer, singer
- Bobby McFerrin, VOCAbuLarieS, CD, 2010, singer (3 Grammy Nominations)
- Flying Pickets, Only Yule, CD, 2010, producer, composer, singer, arranger
- Comedaccordo, CD, 2012, album producer, recording engineer
- Wise Guys, Antidepressivum single, 2013, producer, recording engineer, singer
- Bonner Jazzchor, Bottle This Moment, CD, 2013, album producer, singer
- Wise Guys, Achterbahn, 2014, producer, recording engineer, singer
- Wise Guys, Läuft bei euch, 2015, producer, recording engineer, singer
- Wise Guys, Live in Wien CD/DVD/Blu-ray, 2016, producer, arranger, singer
- Upsweep, Home, EP, 2017, producer, recording engineer, arranger
- Takarabune, Live in Kobe 2017, CD, 2017, producer, recording engineer
- Queen's Tears Honey, JUKEBOX Live From Kobe, CD, 2017, producer, recording engineer

== Published vocal arrangements ==
- Christmas Lullaby (Andrea Figallo), Helbling GmbH
- Shine (Andrea Figallo), Helbling GmbH
- She Walks In Beauty (Andrea Figallo), Helbling GmbH
- I Don't Know (Noa), Published by Edition Ferrimontana GmbH
- My Funny Valentine (Rodgers-Hart), Published by Edition Ferrimontana GmbH
- Letter from Home (Pat Metheny-Noa), Published by Edition Ferrimontana GmbH
- Watch Them Grow (Zach Gill), Published by Edition Ferrimontana GmbH
- I Can't Make You Love Me (Mike Reid, Allen Shamblin), Published by Andrea Figallo
- No Potho Reposare (Giuseppe Rachel, Salvatore Sini), Published by Edition Ferrimontana GmbH
- Dilly Dilly Baby (Figallo-Kamei), Published by Andrea Figallo
- What if (Figallo-Hüneke-Kamei), Published by Edition Ferrimontana GmbH
- Ti Vorrei Sollevare (Elisa), Published by Edition Ferrimontana GmbH
