= You're the Voice =

1986 single by John Farnham

Single by John Farnham

from the album Whispering Jack
- B-side: "Going, Going, Gone"
- Released: 15 September 1986
- Recorded: 1985–1986
- Genre: Soft rock
- Length: 5:04
- Label: Wheatley
- Songwriters: Chris Thompson; Maggie Ryder; Andy Qunta; Keith Reid
- Producer: Ross Fraser

John Farnham singles chronology
"Break the Ice" (1986)	"You're the Voice" (1986)	"Pressure Down" (1986)

Music video
- "You're the Voice" by John Farnham on YouTube

"You're the Voice" is a song recorded by Australian singer John Farnham released in 1986. It became an immediate hit in Australia as well as several European countries including the United Kingdom and Ireland. It was released as a single in September 1986 ahead of his twelfth studio album, Whispering Jack (1986), and was written by Andy Qunta, Keith Reid, Maggie Ryder and Chris Thompson.

In the United States, the song is perhaps best known for a charting version issued in 1991 by the band Heart. The year before, Farmham's version peaked at numbers 72 and 82 on the US Cash Box Top 100 and Billboard Hot 100 charts in 1990. It was also recorded by the Alan Parsons band, featuring Chris Thompson on vocals, and performed by them at the World Liberty Concert in the Netherlands in May 1995. It climbed the charts in Australia again in 2012 after being used in a TV advert.

From early September 2023, Farnham's song was used in a video advert to advocate for the unsuccessful "Yes" campaign in the 2023 Australian Indigenous Voice referendum.

== Background ==
"You're the Voice" was composed by British songwriters Chris Thompson, Andy Qunta and Maggie Ryder in response to an anti-nuclear demonstration in London's Hyde Park in 1985. More than 100,000 people attended the rally, but Thompson overslept. As an act of penance he decided to express his remorse by composing a song that emphasised the importance of invoking personal agency when it comes to effecting political change.

Lyricist Keith Reid confirmed in June 2008 that "You're the Voice" started life with Thompson, who had the musical idea and wanted to have a lyricist involved. It was another of his projects where the music essentially preceded the words, which are all Reid's.

The song was recorded in 1986 by Thompson in a version (not then released) which Farnham's version closely resembles (though it contained no bagpipes) according to Keith. It was included on the Keith Reid Project's The Common Thread 2008 solo CD.

Thompson was initially doubtful if Farnham was able to do the song justice, as he only knew the singer from the novelty song "Sadie (The Cleaning Lady)", which Farnham had performed about 20 years prior as a teenager. Thompson later admitted in an interview that his reaction to Farnham was "You've got to be joking. He's not doing it."

Farnham, who was in considerable debt due to a series of "very bad business decisions", heard the demo and knew this was a make-or-break moment for his career. Having sold his house and car to pay down debts, Farnham went to the basement of the house he was renting and recorded the song. He made the decision to swap out the bass in the demo for bagpipes, which turned out to be a masterstroke. Thompson said, "They changed one note on the bass and put in this brilliant bagpipe solo."

Despite the song going through the chain of command and being improved at every juncture, they hit a wall when it came to securing a deal for Farnham. Wheatley said, "Every label passed on it. I had to release it on Wheatley Records because I couldn't get anyone to take the punt. I knew people at radio would still have a problem playing a John Farnham song [;] they'd still think you of him as Johnny Farnham." Even when the single was released, radio stations were resistant to play it due to the "Johnny Farnham" image.

The song, however, became hugely successful, revived Farnham's career and significantly helped Whispering Jack go 24× Platinum, with sales of 1.68 million in Australia alone. To date, Whispering Jack is the third-highest-selling album of all time in Australia.

== Music video ==
The music video for "You're the Voice" was recorded with celebrities (Derryn Hinch and Jacki Weaver) portraying a married couple having an argument in the kitchen and musicians James and Vince Leigh of Pseudo Echo), Brett Garsed and Greg Macainsh, none of whom are on the original audio recording except Brett Garsed. The cast and band were assembled by Farnham's manager, Glenn Wheatley. Wheatley later recalled, "[it] was done on a shoestring budget. I called in Derryn and Jacki, some of the guys from Pseudo Echo (James and Vince Leigh) and Greg Macainsh from Skyhooks are in the band, it was pretty much anyone who'd do me a favour".

== Chart reception ==
"You're the Voice" was released as a single in September 1986 ahead of Farnham's album Whispering Jack. It was written by Andy Qunta, Keith Reid, Maggie Ryder, and Chris Thompson.

The song was one of the biggest hits of 1986 in Australia, topping the Kent Music Report singles chart for seven weeks from 3 November to 21 December. At the ARIA Music Awards of 1987 it won Single of the Year.

It re-entered the Australian singles chart more than 25 years after its original release (reaching No. 64), due to its appearance in a 2012 Ford TV commercial to advertise the company's SYNC voice control system.

The power ballad is also one of Farnham's biggest successes in Europe, charting at No. 1 in Germany and Sweden and reaching the Top 10 in Austria, Ireland, Switzerland and the UK. Although "You're the Voice" was also successful in Canada (reaching the Top 20), in the United States the track performed relatively poorly, missing the chart on its initial 1987 issue. BMG/RCA re-released the song in the US in February 1990 after Farnham made the Adult Contemporary chart with "Two Strong Hearts". Farnham's version eventually spent eight weeks on the US charts, peaking at No. 82, but in the US the song is perhaps best known for a charting version issued in 1991 by the band Heart.

In January 2018, as part of Triple M's "Ozzest 100" of the "most Australian' songs of all time", the song was ranked number 6. The song was voted 15 in the Triple J Hottest 100 of Australian Songs.

== Charts ==
=== Weekly charts ===
Weekly chart performance for "You're the Voice"
Chart (1986–1990)	Peak position
Australia (Kent Music Report)	1
Austria (Ö3 Austria Top 40)	6
Belgium (Ultratop 50 Flanders)	20
Belgium (Ultratop 50 Wallonia)	13
Canada Top Singles (RPM)	12
Europe (Eurochart Hot 100)	9
Ireland (IRMA)	3
Netherlands (Dutch Top 40)	15
Netherlands (Single Top 100)	18
New Zealand (Recorded Music NZ)	13
Quebec (ADISQ)	10
Sweden (Sverigetopplistan)	1
Switzerland (Schweizer Hitparade)	3
UK Singles (Official Charts)	6
US Billboard Hot 100	82
US Cash Box Top 100	72
West Germany (GfK)	1

Weekly chart performance
Chart (2026)	Peak position
Norway Airplay (IFPI Norge)	69

=== Year-end charts ===
1986 year-end chart performance for "You're the Voice"
Chart (1986)	Position
Australia (Kent Music Report)	14

1987 year-end chart performance for "You're the Voice"
Chart (1987)	Position
Australia (Australian Music Report)	62
Canada Top Singles (RPM)	72
Europe (European Hot 100 Singles)	28
Switzerland (Schweizer Hitparade)	13
UK Singles (OCC)	53
West Germany (Media Control)	6

== Certifications ==
Certifications and sales for "You're the Voice"
Region	Certification	Certified units/sales
Australia (ARIA)	8× Platinum	560,000^{‡}
Denmark (IFPI Danmark)	Gold	45,000^{‡}
New Zealand (RMNZ)	3× Platinum	90,000^{‡}
Sweden (GLF)	Gold	25,000^{^}
United Kingdom (BPI)	Platinum	600,000^{‡}
^{^} Shipments figures based on certification alone.^{‡} Sales+streaming figures based on certification alone.

== In popular culture ==
The song has been featured in numerous TV and film productions, including the films Hot Rod, Alan Partridge: Alpha Papa, the BBC series Merlin and comedian Peter Kay's Car Share.

The Australian Electoral Commission has used the song in advertisements surrounding Australian state and federal elections since 2001.

John Farnham performed the song live at the closing ceremony the Melbourne 2006 Commonwealth Games.

In 2009, the song was included in Grand Theft Auto: Episodes from Liberty City for the Vice City FM radio station, but was removed following its 10th anniversary.

In 2012 the song was used in a Ford TV commercial to advertise the company's SYNC voice control system.

The song was used by anti-lockdown protesters who rallied in Melbourne, Victoria, during the COVID-19 pandemic. On 21 September 2020, it was reported by Seven News that the song had become a common theme at rallies around the city as Stage 4 lockdowns continued. Farnham's manager described the unauthorised use of the song as "offensive" to Farnham and the manager himself.

From 3 September 2023, the song was used to advocate for the "Yes" campaign in the 2023 Australian Indigenous Voice referendum, a vote to change the Australian Constitution to enshrine a Voice to Parliament for Indigenous Australians. The song played as a soundtrack for a video advert directed by filmmaker Warwick Thornton, which was released on social and other digital media and television.

== Heart version ==
"You're the Voice"

Single by Heart

from the album Rock the House Live!
- B-side: "Wild Child" (live)
- Released: 2 September 1991
- Recorded: November 1990
- Genre: Rock
- Length: 5:05
- Label: Capitol
- Songwriters: Andy Qunta; Keith Reid; Maggie Ryder; Chris Thompson
- Producer: Richie Zito

Heart singles chronology
"Secret" (1991)	"You're the Voice" (1991)	"Black on Black II" (1993)

Music video
- "You're The Voice" by Heart on YouTube

As a lead promotion for their first live album, Rock the House Live!, in 1991, US rock band Heart released their live version of "You're the Voice" as a single. It was recorded during the US leg of their Brigade world tour in November 1990. Commercially, the single reached No. 20 on the US Billboard Album Rock Tracks chart. In the UK, the single peaked at No. 56. A music video was released that includes footage shot from the tour while coverage of the then-ongoing Gulf War intervene.

The song was released in multiple limited-edition formats in different territories. A studio version of the track had been recorded in late 1989 as part of the sessions for the Brigade album, though it did not make the album track list. This studio version would not see release until July 2000, when it was included on Greatest Hits: 1985–1995.

=== Charts ===
Weekly chart performance for "You're the Voice"
Chart (1991)	Peak position
Canada Top Singles (RPM)	65
UK Singles (Official Charts)	56
US Mainstream Rock Airplay (Billboard)	20

=== Release history ===
Release dates and formats for "You're the Voice"
Region	Date	Format(s)	Label(s)	Ref.
United Kingdom	2 September 1991	7-inch vinyl; 10-inch vinyl; CD; cassette	Capitol	
Japan	20 September 1991	Mini-CD	Capitol	
Australia	2 March 1992	CD	Capitol	

== Alan Parsons and Chris Thompson versions ==
"You're the Voice"

Single by Alan Parsons
- B-side: "White Dawn"
- Released: 1995
- Recorded: February 1995
- Studio: Parsonics, Santa Barbara, California
- Genre: Rock; pop
- Length: 4:14 (radio edit)
- Label: CNR Music
- Songwriters: Andy Qunta, Keith Reid, Maggie Ryder, Chris Thompson
- Producer: Alan Parsons

Alan Parsons singles chronology
"Luciferama (live)" (1994)	"You're the Voice" (1995)	"Brother up in Heaven" (1996)

Audio
- "You're the Voice" by Alan Parsons on YouTube

Chris Thompson had joined Alan Parsons' band for his first solo album after the split of the Alan Parsons Project and was also one of the two frontmen on the ensuing tour, which was captured on the album Alan Parsons Live. For the US release of this album in 1995 (retitled The Very Best Live), the band added three new studio recordings recorded in February 1995. One of these was "You're the Voice", which marked the first time a version featuring the original songwriter had been released. Parsons produced the song.

"You're the Voice" was then performed at the World Liberty Concert in May 1995 by the Alan Parsons Band, Thompson and Metropole Orkest. The only official release associated with the concert was a single featuring a radio edit of the live version (faded out after four minutes). The B-side was a live recording of "White Dawn", which was performed by Metropole Orkest and the Gelders Opera and Operetta Gezelschap (GOOG) choir. The song was arranged by Andrew Powell and conducted by Dick Bakker. During the performance of "White Dawn", a battle was simulated that included gunfire, which can be heard around the middle of the recording. This track has not been issued on any other release.

=== Track listing ===
1. "You're the Voice (Radio Edit)" – (Qunta, Thompson, Reid, Ryder) – 4:14 lead vocals Chris Thompson
2. "White Dawn" – (Parsons) – 4:50 instrumental

Thompson has continued singing the song live in concert, e.g. with Mandoki Soulmates as recorded on the live album BudaBest as well as recording several more studio versions, e.g. with Mads Eriksen on the album Rediscovery. The original demo by Qunta and Thompson appeared on the deluxe reissue of Qunta's album Legend in a Loungeroom.

== Other cover versions ==
=== Rebecca St. James ===
On her second release, "God", in 1996 it is featured as the second track.

=== Planet Rock Allstars ===
In November 2019, a single in support of the mental health charity MIND was curated by Planet Rock DJ Wyatt Wendels in conjunction with a 2000-mile charity cycle ride The Road to Rockstock. The limited release CD was then made available from the ride's support vehicle, during late November/early December. The CD features three versions, the main version featuring many rock artists including Alice Cooper, Joe Elliott, Justin Hawkins, Bruce Dickinson and Dan Reed. The other versions include the original backing track with Toby Jepson on vocals, and a version with vocals by Joe Elliott. The song was released as a digital download on 6 December 2019.
