= Maggie Ryder =

- Born: England, United Kingdom
- Occupations: Singer; songwriter; musician
- Instruments: Keyboards; vocals
- Label: Polydor

Maggie Ryder is an English singer/songwriter and musician, principally known as a backing singer for artists such Brian May and Eurythmics.

== Career ==
In her early career, Ryder was the keyboard player with British funk/rock band Krakatoa. She co-wrote much of the band's repertoire with her partner Graeme Lamb. She left the band to pursue a solo career as a vocalist/songwriter and was replaced on keyboards in Krakatoa by Hans Zimmer.

She had a solo record deal with Polydor Records in the 1970s and released a self-titled album in 1978. She worked as a backing singer and songwriter through the Eighties. She sang backing vocals for Marvin Gaye (1981), Eurythmics (1983), Manfred Mann's Earth Band (1987/96), Go West (1987), and Queen at the Freddie Mercury Tribute Concert in 1992. Ryder was one of the songwriters of "You're the Voice," an international hit single for John Farnham.

Ryder sang backing vocals on Brian May's Back to the Light album, released in 1992, and on the subsequent world tour. Ryder worked with Eric Clapton during his 1993 Tour and his 1994 Royal Albert Hall dates.

She was the co-writer (with Derek Magoogan) of "Love With No Strings" on Chaka Khan's "The Woman I Am" album.

== Television appearances ==
She appeared in a few TV dramas, including an episode of Juliet Bravo in 1983.

== Web designer ==
Ryder moved to New York in 1995 and is now a website designer and creative technologist.
