= Sherbet discography =

- Studio albums: 10
- Extended plays: 1
- Live albums: 3
- Compilation albums: 11
- Singles: 38
- Video albums: 2

The discography of Sherbet, including releases under the names Highway and The Sherbs, consists of ten studio albums, thirty-eight singles, one extended play, eleven compilation albums, three live albums and two video album/DVDs.

By February 1979, the band had amassed a total of six platinum and five gold albums in Australia.

== Studio albums ==
Year	Title	Chart peak positions			Certification
Year	Title	AUS KMR	NZL	US	Certification
1972	Time Change... A Natural Progression: Released: December 1972; Label: Infinity Records (INL-34725), Festival Records; Formats: LP, cassette; Producer: Howard Gable, Pat Austin, Ross Linton	66	—	—	AUS: Gold
1973	On with the Show: Released: November 1973; Label: Infinity Records (L-35007), Festival Records; Formats: LP; Producer: Tweed Harris	6	—	—	AUS: Gold
1974	Slipstream: Released: September 1974; Label: Infinity Records (L-35275), Festival Records; Formats: LP, cassette; Producer: Richard Batchens, Sherbet	3	—	—	AUS: Gold
1975	Life... Is for Living: Released: November 1975; Label: Infinity Records (L-35652), Festival Records; Formats: LP, cassette; Producer: Clive Shakespeare, Garth Porter, John L Sayers	3	—	—	
1976	Howzat: Released: July 1976; Label: Infinity Records (L-35905), Festival Records; Formats: LP, cassette; Producer: Richard Lush, Sherbet	1	12	—	
1977	Photoplay aka Magazine: Released: June 1977; Label: Festival Records (L-36268), MCA (2304); Formats: LP, Cassette; Producer: Richard Lush, Sherbet	4	—	—	
1978	Sherbet aka Highway 1 by Highway: Released: August 1978; Label: Festival Records (L-36617); Formats: LP, cassette: Producer: Jay Lewis	6	—	—	
1980	The Skill by The Sherbs: Released: October 1980; Label: Festival Records (L-37394), Razzle Records; Formats: LP, cassette; Producer: Richard Lush, The Sherbs	85	—	100	
1981	Defying Gravity by The Sherbs: Released: November 1981; Label: Festival Records (L-37698); Formats: LP, cassette; Producer: Richard Lush, The Sherbs	—	—	—	
1982	Shaping Up by The Sherbs: Released: November 1982; Label: Razzle Records, Festival Records (L 20021); Formats: Mini-LP, cassette; Producer: Richard Lush	—	—	—	
"—" denotes releases that did not chart or were not released in that country.

== Live albums ==
Year	Title	Chart peak positions
Year	Title	AUS KMR
1975	In Concert: Released: March 1975; Label:Infinity Records (L-35443), Festival Records; Formats: LP, Cassette; Producer: Richard Batchens, Roger Davies, Sherbet	11
1977	Caught in the Act... Live: Released: October 1977; Label: Festival Records (L-36417); Formats: LP, Cassette; Producer: Sherbet, Richard Lush	33
2007	Live – And the Crowd Went Wild: Released: 23 June 2007; Label: Liberation Records (BLUE1262); Formats: CD; Producer:	—
"—" denotes releases that did not chart or were not released in that country.

== Compilation albums ==
Year	Title	Chart peak positions	
Year	Title	AUS KMR	NZL
1975	Sherbet's Greatest Hits 1970–75: Released: August 1975; Label:Infinity Records (L 35525), Festival Records; Formats: LP, Cassette	1	—
1976	The Sherbet Collection: Released: November 1976; Label: Festival Records (L36027); Formats: LP, Cassette	5	8
1979	Track Record: Released: August 1979; Label: Festival Records (L 368218); Formats: LP, Cassette	79	—
1980	The Sherbet Phenomenon: Released: 1980; Label: Hammard Records (HAM056); Formats: LP, Cassette	59	—
1984	The Hits 1969–1984: Released: March 1984; Label: Festival Records (L38171); Formats: LP, cassette	75	—
1999	Howzat! – 30th Anniversary Celebration Collection: Released: August 1999; Label: Festival Records(D 46110); Formats: 2×CD	98	—
2001	The Great Sherbet: Released: 2001; Label: RedX Records (RMGR0415); Formats: 3×CD	—	—
2001	Anthology: Released: 2001; Label: Burning Airlines (PILOT 106); Formats: CD	—	—
2006	Super Hits: Released:17 July 2006; Label: Liberation Records (BLUE1242); Formats: CD	13^{°}	—
2008	Anthology: Released: 2008; Label: Liberation Records (BLUE163.2); Formats: 2×CD	—	—
2017	Greatest Hits: Released:24 November 2017; Label: Liberation Records (BLOOD6); Formats: CD, DD	—	—
"—" denotes releases that did not chart or were not released in that country.

Notes

- ° Australian Music DVD Chart.

== Extended plays ==
Year	Title	Chart peak positions	
Year	Title	AUS Go-Set	AUS KMR
1971	Can You Feel It Baby (EP): Released: September 1971; Label:Festival Records (FX-11,796); Formats: EP; Producer: Pat Aulton, Nova	22	16

== Singles ==
Year	Title	Peak chart positions								Album
Year	Title	AUS Go-Set	AUS KMR	NZL RIANZ	UK	US Hot	US Main	NLD Top 40	NOR VG-lista	Album
1970	"Crimson Ships" b/w "Everything"	—	—	—	—	—	—	—	—	Can You Feel It Baby (EP)
1971	"Can You Feel It, Baby?" b/w "The Love You Save (May Be Your Own)"	22	16	—	—	—	—	—	—	Time Change... A Natural Progression
1971	"Free the People" b/w "All Our Yesterdays"	33	18	—	—	—	—	—	—	Time Change... A Natural Progression
1972	"You're All Woman" b/w "Back Home"	13	19	—	—	—	—	—	—	Time Change... A Natural Progression
1972	"You've Got the Gun" b/w "Do It"	29	27	—	—	—	—	—	—	Time Change... A Natural Progression
1973	"Hound Dog" b/w "Can I Drive You Home"	21	18	—	—	—	—	—	—	Non-album single
1973	"Cassandra" b/w "Time Change"	5	9	—	—	—	—	—	—	On with the Show
1974	"So Glad You're Mine" b/w "For Your Love"	—	44	—	—	—	—	—	—	Slipstream
1974	"Slipstream" b/w "Jungle Jiver"	7	5	—	—	—	—	—	—	Slipstream
1974	"Silvery Moon" b/w "Summer Satisfaction"	—	5	—	—	—	—	—	—	Slipstream
1975	"Summer Love" b/w "(You Go Your Way) I'll Go Mine"	—	1	—	—	—	—	—	—	Non-album single
1975	"Freedom" b/w "Wishing Well" (live double A-side)	—	52	—	—	—	—	—	—	Sherbet in Concert
1975	"Life" b/w "Survival"	—	4	—	—	—	—	—	—	Life... Is for Living
1975	"Only One You" b/w "Matter of Time" (double A-side)	—	5	—	—	—	—	—	—	Life... Is for Living
1976	"Child's Play" b/w "Just Being You"	—	4	—	—	—	—	—	—	Non-album single
1976	"Howzat" b/w "Motor of Love"	—	1	1	4	61	—	6	8	Howzat!
1976	"Gimme' Love" b/w "Hollywood Dreaming" (double A-side)	—	43	—	—	—	—	—	—	Howzat!
1976	"Rock Me Gently" b/w "You've Got the Gun (1976 version)" (double A-side)	—	6	—	—	—	—	—	—	The Sherbet Collection
1977	"Magazine Madonna" b/w "Still in Love with You"	—	2	25	—	—	—	—	—	Photoplay
1977	"High Rollin'" b/w "Midsummer Madness"	—	33	—	—	—	—	—	—	Photoplay
"—" denotes a recording that did not chart or was not released in that territory.

Year	Title	Peak chart positions			Album
Year	Title	AUS KMR	US Hot	US Main	Album
1978	"Nowhere Man"	40	—	—	Caught in the Act... Live
1978	"(Feels Like It's) Slipping Away" b/w "Safe Water"	22	—	—	Sherbet
1978	"Another Night on the Road" b/w "Winnipeg Sidestep"	10	—	—	Sherbet
1978	"Beg Steal or Borrow" / "You Made a Fool" (double A-side)	—	—	—	Sherbet
1979	"Angela" b/w "Take My Heart"	85	—	—	Non-album single
1979	"Heart Get Ready" b/w "Skyline (Live)" (A-side by Highway)	89	—	—	Non-album single
1980	"Never Surrender" b/w "Love You to Death" (by The Sherbs)	—	—	—	The Skill
1980	"I'm OK" b/w "Into the Heat" (by The Sherbs)	—	—	—	The Skill
1980	"Juliet and Me" b/w "I'll Be Faster" (by The Sherbs)	—	—	—	The Skill
1980	"I Have the Skill" b/w "Parallel Bars" (by The Sherbs)	—	61	14	The Skill
1981	"Crazy in the Night" b/w "Into the Heat" (by The Sherbs)	—	—	—	The Skill
1981	"Free the Sailor" b/w "Blood On My Hands" (by The Sherbs)	—	—	—	Defying Gravity
1982	"Some People" b/w "We Ride Tonight" (by The Sherbs)	—	—	—	Defying Gravity
1982	"We Ride Tonight" b/w "Some People" (by The Sherbs; Re-release of the Some People single, with We Ride Tonight as the A-side)	—	—	26	Defying Gravity
1982	"Don't Throw It All Away" b/w "Knowing You" (by The Sherbs)	62	—	—	Shaping Up
1982	"Shaping Up" b/w "I Don't Wanna Lose You" (by The Sherbs)	76	—	—	Shaping Up
1983	"The Arrow" b/w "Wild Is the Sea" (by The Sherbs)	—	—	—	Shaping Up
1984	"Tonight Will Last Forever" b/w "Howzat (Live)"	69	—	—	The Hits: 1969–1984
2006	"Hearts are Insane" b/w "Red Dress"	—	—	—	Super Hits
"—" denotes a recording that did not chart or was not released in that territory.

== DVDs ==
Year	Title
2006	Super Hits: Released: 15 July 2006; Label: Liberation Records (LIBDVD1062)
2007	Live....And The Crowd Went Wild: Released: 22 June 2007; Label: Liberation Records (LIBDVD1068)
