= The Sherbet Phenomenon =

Compilation album by Sherbet
- Released: late 1980
- Genre: Rock, pop
- Label: Hammard Records
- Producer: Howard Gable, Pat Austin, Ross Linton, Tweed Harris, Richard Batchens, Sherbet

Sherbet chronology
The Skill (1980)	The Sherbet Phenomenon (1980)	Defying Gravity (1981)

The Sherbet Phenomenon is the fourth compilation album by Australian rock band Sherbet released in 1980.

== Track listing ==
Side A
No.	Title	Writer(s)	Album	Length
1.	"Free the People"	Barbara Keith	Time Change... A Natural Progression	2:37
2.	"You're All Woman"	Ted Mulry	Time Change... A Natural Progression	2:52
3.	"Hound Dog"	Jerry Leiber and Mike Stoller	Non album single	2:24
4.	"Cassandra"	Garth Porter, Clive Shakespeare	On With the Show	3:15
5.	"Slipstream"	Porter, Shakespeare	Slipstream	2:57
6.	"Silvery Moon"	Porter, Shakespeare	Slipstream	3:21
7.	"You're My World" (Daryl Braithwaite solo)	Umberto Bindi, Gino Paoli, Carl Sigman	non album single	3:06
8.	"Summer Love"	Porter, Shakespeare	non album single	3:34
9.	"Life"	Porter, Shakespeare	Life... Is for Living	3:26
10.	"Only One You"	Porter, Shakespeare	Life... Is for Living	3:27

Side B
No.	Title	Writer(s)	Album	Length
1.	"Matter of Time"	Porter, Shakespeare	Life... Is for Living	2:57
2.	"Child's Play"	Porter, Shakespeare	non album single	3:17
3.	"Howzat"	Porter, Tony Mitchell	Howzat	3:42
4.	"Rock Me Gently"	Porter, Braithwaite, Alan Sandow, Mitchell	The Sherbet Collection	3:34
5.	"You've Got the Gun"	Porter, Shakespeare, Braithwaite	The Sherbet Collection	3:30
6.	"Love Has No Pride" (Daryl Braithwaite solo)	Eric Kaz, Libby Titus	Daryl Braithwaite... Best Of	3:18
7.	"Magazine Madonna"	Mitchell	Photoplay	4:05
8.	"(Feel Like It's) Slippin' Away"	Porter, Morgan	Sherbet	3:21
9.	"Another Night On the Road"	Porter, Mitchell, Roger Davies, Jon Wood	Sherbet	3:46

== Chart positions ==
Chart (1981)	Peak position
Australian Kent Music Report	59

== Personnel ==
- Bass, vocals – Tony Mitchell
- Drums – Alan Sandow
- Guitar, vocals – Clive Shakespeare
- Keyboards, vocals – Garth Porter
- Lead vocals – Daryl Braithwaite
