= Sherbet's Greatest Hits =

Greatest hits album by Sherbet
- Released: July 1975
- Recorded: 1970–1975
- Genre: Rock
- Length: 44:12
- Label: Infinity (distributed by Festival Records)
- Producer: Pat Aulton; Ross Linton; Sherbet; Howard Gable; Tweed Harris; Richard Batchens; John French

Sherbet chronology
Sherbet in Concert (1975)	Sherbet's Greatest Hits (1975)	Life... Is for Living (1975)

Professional ratings
Review scores
Source	Rating
AllMusic	4/5 stars

Sherbet's Greatest Hits (1970–75) is a compilation album released on Infinity Records in Australia in July 1975 at the height of Sherbet's popularity in Australia. It spent one week at the top of the Australian albums chart in 1975.

It was Sherbet's first number-one album in Australia and covered the band's singles released from 1970 to 1975.

== Track listing ==
Side A
No.	Title	Writer(s)	Album	Length
1.	"Can You Feel It, Baby?"	Roger Cook, Roger Greenaway	Time Change... A Natural Progression	3:20
2.	"Free the People"	Barbara Keith	Time Change... A Natural Progression	2:43
3.	"You're All Woman"	Ted Mulry	Time Change... A Natural Progression	2:55
4.	"You've Got the Gun"	Garth Porter, Clive Shakespeare, Daryl Braithwaite	Time Change... A Natural Progression	3:10
5.	"Hound Dog"	Jerry Leiber and Mike Stoller	Non-album single	2:24
6.	"Cassandra"	Porter, Shakespeare	On with the Show	3:16
7.	"So Glad You're Mine"	Porter, Shakespeare	Slipstream	3:16

Side B
No.	Title	Writer(s)	Album	Length
1.	"Slipstream"	Porter, Shakespeare	Slipstream	2:58
2.	"Silvery Moon"	Porter, Shakespeare	Slipstream	3:20
3.	"You're My World" (Daryl Braithwaite solo)	Umberto Bindi, Gino Paoli, Carl Sigman	non-album single	3:05
4.	"Can I Drive You Home?"	Braithwaite, Porter, Shakespeare	B-side single of "Hound Dog"	3:05
5.	"For Your Love"	Shakespeare	B-side single of "So Glad You're Mine"	3:10
6.	"Back Home"	Porter	B-side single of "You're All Woman"	2:58
7.	"Do It"	Porter, Shakespeare	Time Change... A Natural Progression	2:13
Total length:				44:12

== Personnel ==
- Tony Mitchell – bass guitar, vocals
- Alan Sandow – drums
- Clive Shakespeare – guitar, vocals
- Garth Porter – keyboards, vocals
- Daryl Braithwaite – lead vocals

== Charts ==
=== Weekly charts ===
Chart (1975)	Peak position
Australian Albums (Kent Music Report)	1

=== Year-end charts ===
Chart (1975)	Position
Australian Albums (Kent Music Report)	16

== Release history ==
Country	Date	Label	Format	Catalog
Australia	July 1975	Infinity Records	LP, Cassette	L 35525
Australia	1998	Infinity	CD (re-release)	D20028
