= The Hits 1969–1984 =

The Hits 1969-1984

Greatest hits album by Sherbet
- Released: March 1984
- Genre: Rock, pop
- Label: Festival

Sherbet chronology
Shaping Up (1982)	The Hits 1969-1984 (1984)	Howzat! – 30th Anniversary Celebration Collection (1999)

Singles from The Hits 1969–1984
- 1. "Tonight Will Last Forever" Released: March 1984

The Hits 1969–1984 is a compilation album by Sherbet released in March 1984. It contains no songs they recorded as "The Sherbs", which was the name the band used from 1980 through 1983—nor, despite the title, does it include any recordings from as early as 1969. Instead, this compilation concentrates solely on presenting the group's hits recorded as Sherbet between 1971 and 1978, alongside one new Sherbet track from 1984 entitled "Tonight Will Last Forever".

== Track listing ==
Side A

1. "Can You Feel It, Baby?" - 3:27
2. "Free the People" - 2:40
3. "You're All Woman" - 2:52
4. "You've Got the Gun" - 3:09
5. "Hound Dog" - 2:23
6. "Cassandra" - 3:14
7. "Slipstream" - 2:56
8. "Silvery Moon" - 3:22
9. "Summer Love" - 3:34

Side B

1. "Life" - 3:27
2. "Only One You" - 3:27
3. "Child's Play" - 3:29
4. "Howzat" - 3:43
5. "Rock Me Gently" - 3:46
6. "Magazine Madonna" - 4:07
7. "Another Night On the Road" - 3:47
8. "Tonight Will Last Forever" - 3:28

== Charts ==
Chart (1984)	Peak position
Australia (Kent Music Report)	76
