= In Concert (Sherbet album) =

Live album by Sherbet
- Released: March 1975
- Genre: Pop rock
- Length: 38:43
- Label: Infinity, Festival
- Producer: Richard Batchens, Roger Davies, Sherbet

Sherbet chronology
Slipstream (1974)	In Concert (1975)	Sherbet's Greatest Hits (1975)

Singles from In Concert
- 1. "Freedom" Released: March 1975

In Concert is the first live album by Sherbet, released in March 1975. It reached number 11 on the Kent Music Report in Australia.

== Track listing ==
Side A
No.	Title	Writer(s)	Length
1.	"Cassandra"	Garth Porter, Clive Shakespeare	3:28
2.	"Wishing Well"	John Bundrick, Paul Kossoff, Paul Rodgers, Simon Kirke, Tetsu Yamauchi	3:40
3.	"Another Hustler"	Porter, Shakespeare	3:28
4.	"Jungle Jiver"	Porter, Shakespeare	6:15
5.	"Do It"	Porter, Shakespeare	2:24

Side B
No.	Title	Writer(s)	Length
1.	"Freedom"	Porter, Shakespeare	3:46
2.	"Medley" ("Can You Feel It, Baby?", "You've Got the Gun", "You're All Woman")	Roger Cook, Roger Greenaway, Porter, Shakespeare, Daryl Braithwaite, Ted Mulry	8:29
3.	"Hound Dog"	Jerry Leiber and Mike Stoller	5:06
4.	"Medley" ("Au Revoir", "Goodbye")	Porter, Shakespeare	3:27
Total length:			38:43

== Charts ==
Chart (1975)	Peak position
Australia Kent Music Report	11

== Personnel ==
- Bass guitar, harmony vocals – Tony Mitchell
- Drums, percussion – Alan Sandow
- Lead guitar, slide guitar, harmony vocals – Clive Shakespeare
- Lead vocals, tambourine – Daryl Braithwaite
- Organ [Hammond], grand piano [Steinway Concert], mellotron, electric piano [Wurlitzer], harmony vocals – Garth Porter

Production

- Producer – Roger Davies, Sherbet
- Produced, engineered, mixed and edited by Richard Batchens

== Notes ==
- Recorded live on Sherbet's National '74 Spring Tour at the Sydney Opera House and Melbourne Festival Hall.
- Engineered, mixed and edited at Festival's 'Studio 24', December 1974.
- "Wishing Well" is a cover from Free's 1973 Heartbreaker album and was released as the B-side of the "Freedom" single.

== Release history ==
Country	Date	Label	Format	Catalog
Australia	March 1975	Festival Records	LP	L 35443
