= Can You Feel It Baby (EP) =

EP by Sherbet
- Released: September 1971
- Genre: Rock
- Length: 11:56
- Label: Festival Records
- Producer: Pat Aulton, Nova

Sherbet chronology
Can You Feel It Baby (1971)	Time Change... A Natural Progression (1972)

Singles from Can You Feel It Baby
- 1. "Crimson Ships" Released: 1970; 2. "Can You Feel It, Baby?" Released: June 1971

Can You Feel It Baby is the debut EP album by Australian band Sherbet, released in September 1971.

The EP includes the single "Can You Feel It, Baby?", which was released in June 1971 and peaked at number 16 on the Kent Music Report.

== Track listing ==
No.	Title	Writer(s)	Length
1.	"Can You Feel It, Baby?"	Roger Cook, Roger Greenaway	3:25
2.	"Everything"	Clark, Northern, Bailey	2:08
3.	"The Love You Save (May Be Your Own)"	Corporation	2:49
4.	"Crimson Ships"	Tom and Pete	3:33

== Personnel ==
- Denis Loughlin – lead vocals
- Daryl Braithwaite – lead vocals
- Bruce Worrall – bass
- Tony Mitchell – bass
- Sam See – keyboards, vocals
- Garth Porter – keyboards, vocals
- Clive Shakespeare – guitar, vocals
- Alan Sandow – drums
