= The Skill =

Studio album by The Sherbs
- Released: October 1980
- Genre: Rock, pop
- Length: 45:31
- Label: Atco, Infinity, Festival
- Producer: Sherbs, Richard Lush

The Sherbs chronology
Track Record (1979)	The Skill (1980)	The Sherbet Phenomenon (1980)

Singles from The Skill
- 1. "Never Surrender" Released: February 1980; 2. "I'm OK" Released: May 1980; 3. "Juliet and Me" Released: August 1980; 4. "I Have the Skill" Released: November 1980; 5. "Crazy in the Night" Released: March 1981

Professional ratings
Review scores
Source	Rating
AllMusic	3/5 stars

The Skill is the eighth studio album by the Australian band Sherbet but also the first under their new name, The Sherbs. It was released in October 1980 and reached at number 85 on the Kent Music Report.

The title track single, "I Have the Skill" peaked at No. 61 on the Billboard Hot 100 Charts in early 1981. It also peaked as high as No. 14 on the Billboard Mainstream Rock Charts.

== Reception ==
Cash Box wrote: "The revitalised fivesome plays a nifty brand of modern power pop that should please both Top 40 and AOR programmers. Best cuts are 'I Have the Skill' and 'Cindy's Waiting'".

== Track listing ==
Side A
No.	Title	Writer(s)	Length
1.	"I Have the Skill"	Daryl Braithwaite, Garth Porter, Tony Mitchell	3:46
2.	"Back to Zero"	Braithwaite, Porter, Mitchell, Harvey James, Alan Sandow	3:22
3.	"Cindy is Waiting"	Porter	4:16
4.	"Crazy in the Night"	Porter	3:50
5.	"I'll Be Faster"	Braithwaite, Porter, Mitchell, James, Sandow	3:43
6.	"Never Surrender"	Braithwaite, Porter, Mitchell, James, Sandow	3:47

Side B
No.	Title	Writer(s)	Length
1.	"No Turning Back"	Braithwaite, Porter, Mitchell, James, Sandow	5:30
2.	"Love You to Death"	Braithwaite, Porter, Mitchell, James, Sandow	4:08
3.	"Into the Heat"	Braithwaite, Porter, Mitchell, James, Sandow	3:14
4.	"I'm OK"	Braithwaite, Porter, Mitchell, James, Sandow	3:31
5.	"Juliet and Me"	Braithwaite, Porter, Mitchell	4:16
6.	"Parallel Bars"	Porter, Mitchell	4:08
Total length:			45:31

== Personnel ==
- Tony Mitchell – bass guitar
- Garth Porter – keyboards
- Daryl Braithwaite – vocals
- Alan Sandow – drums
- Harvey James – guitar

== Charts ==
Chart (1980)	Peak position
Australia Kent Music Report	85
US Billboard 200	100

== Release history ==
Country	Date	Label	Format	Catalog
Australia	October 1980	Festival	LP, Cassette	L 37394
United States	January 1981	Atco	LP	K 50783
Australia	5 July 1999	Festival	CD	D20087
United States	14 March 2000	Renaissance	CD	RMED-00171
