= The Sherbet Collection =

Compilation album by Sherbet
- Released: November 1976
- Genre: Rock, pop
- Length: 42:04
- Label: Festival

Sherbet chronology
Howzat (1976)	The Sherbet Collection (1976)	Photoplay (1977)

Singles from The Sherbet Collection
- 1. "Rock Me Gently"/"You've Got the Gun" Released: October 1976

The Sherbet Collection is a compilation album by Australian band Sherbet released in November 1976. The album reached number 5 on the Kent Music Report of Australia and number 8 on the Recorded Music NZ chart.

== Track listing ==
Side A
No.	Title	Writer(s)	Length
1.	"You've Got the Gun (1976 Version)"	Garth Porter, Clive Shakespeare, Daryl Braithwaite	3:56
2.	"If I Had My Way"	Porter	4:13
3.	"Old Sid"	Warren Morgan	3:25
4.	"Only One You"	Porter, Shakespeare	3:27
5.	"Time"	Braithwaite	2:46
6.	"Howzat"	Porter, Tony Mitchell	3:47

Side B
No.	Title	Writer(s)	Length
1.	"Rock Me Gently"	Porter, Braithwaite, Alan Sandow, Mitchell	3:39
2.	"Matter of Time"	Porter, Shakespeare	3:00
3.	"Child's Play"	Shakespeare	3:19
4.	"Cavalry"	Braithwaite, Mitchell, Ronnie Peel	3:36
5.	"(You Go Your Way) I'll Go Mine"	Mitchell	3:11
6.	"Summer Love"	Porter, Shakespeare	3:39
Total length:			42:04

== Chart positions ==
Chart (1976/77)	Peak position
Australian (Kent Music Report)	5
Recorded Music NZ	8

== Release history ==
Country	Date	Label	Format	Catalog
Australia	November 1976	Festival	LP, Cassette	L36027
Australia	1999	Festival	CD	D20037
