= Rock Me Gently =

Rock Me Gently may refer to:

- "Rock Me Gently" (Andy Kim song)
- "Rock Me Gently" (Erasure song)
- "Rock Me Gently", a 1976 song on The Sherbet Collection, an album by Sherbet
