= Countdown Spectacular =

The Countdown Spectacular is a series of concerts reviving the nostalgia of the Australian music television series Countdown.

== Countdown Spectacular ==
The first tour was staged from June to August 2006. It featured mainly Australian artists and groups, some re-forming specially for the tour. The Melbourne concert was edited into a television special and CD/DVD.on Liberation Records

CD 1

1. "Yesterday's Hero" by John Paul Young
2. "If I Were a Carpenter" by Swanee
3. "Change in Mood" by Scott Carne (of Kids in the Kitchen)
4. "Spend the Night" by Cheetah
5. "Run to Paradise" by Choirboys
6. "Looking for an Echo" by Frankie J Holden and Wilbur Wilde (of Ol' 55)
7. "On the Prowl" by Frankie J Holden and Wilbur Wilde (of Ol' 55)
8. "Play the Game by Wendy Stapleton
9. "Everybody Wants to Work" by Brian Mannix (of Uncanny X-Men)
10. "Stuck On You" by Paul Norton
11. "Shape I'm In" by Jo Jo Zep
12. "What About Me?" by Alex Smith (of Moving Pictures
13. "Send Me An Angel" by David Sterry (of Real Life)
14. "Who Listens to the Radio" by Stephen Cummings (of The Sports)
15. "Heaven (Must Be There)" by Eurogliders
16. "Don't Fall in Love" by Bill Miller (of The Ferrets)
17. "Shaddap You Face" by Joe Dolce
18. "Glad All Over" by Hush
19. "Bony Moronie" by Hush

CD 2

1. "Solid Rock" by Shane Howard (of Goanna)
2. "You Make Me Feel Like Dancing" by Leo Sayer
3. "When I Need You" by Leo Say
4. "I Hear Motion" by James Freud and Sean Kelly (of Models)
5. "Out of Mind, Out of Sight" by James Freud, Sean Kelly (of Models)
6. "Wanna Be Up" by Chantoozies
7. Medley > "Words Are Not Enough" / "Six Ribbons" by Jon English
8. "Hollywood 7" by Jon English
9. "Funkytown" by Brian Canham (of Pseudo Echo)
10. Medley > "Cool World" / "Summer of '81" by Mondo Rock
11. "Come Said the Boy" by Mondo Rock

CD 3

1. "It's a Man's Man's Man's World" by Renée Geyer
2. "Say I Love You" by Renée Geyer
3. "Reckless" by James Reyne (of Australian Crawl)
4. Medley > "Fall of Rome" / "Beautiful People" / "Errol" / "The Boys Light Up" by James Reyne (of Australian Crawl)
5. "I Hate the Music" by John Paul Young
6. "Summer Love" by Sherbet
7. "Cassandra" by Sherbet
8. "Life" by Sherbet
9. "Rock Me Gently" by Sherbet
10. "Matter of Time" by Sherbet
11. "Howzat" by Sherbet
12. Finale Medley > "Living in the 70's" / "Never Tear Us Apart" / "April Sun in Cuba" / "High Voltage" by The Countdown Spectacular Live Cast

=== Charts ===
Chart performance for The Countdown Spectacular Live
Chart (2006–2007)	Peak position
Australian Albums (ARIA)	44
Australian DVD (ARIA)	4

=== Certifications ===
Certifications for The Countdown Spectacular Live
Region	Certification	Certified units/sales
Australia (ARIA)	2× Platinum	30,000^{^}
^{^} Shipments figures based on certification alone.

== Countdown Spectacular 2 ==
A second tour was held from Saturday 18 August to Wednesday 5 September 2007 in all major capital cities of Australia. The concerts were hosted by Ian "Molly" Meldrum, John Paul Young and Gavin Wood. A CD was released.

CD 1

1. "Walking On Sunshine" by Katrina Leskanich (of Katrina and the Waves)
2. "Ça plane pour moi" by Plastic Bertrand
3. "It's All Over Now, Baby Blue" by Graham Bonnet
4. "Comin' Home" by The Radiators
5. "Do Ya Do Ya (Wanna Please Me)" by Samantha Fox
6. "Touch Me (I Want Your Body)" by Samantha Fox
7. "They Won't Let My Girlfriend Talk to Me" by Ignatius Jones (of Jimmy and the Boys)
8. "I'm Not Like Everybody Else" by Ignatius Jones (of Jimmy and the Boys)
9. "Magic" by David Paton (of Pilot)
10. "January" by David Paton (of Pilot)
11. "Lay Your Love on Me" by Richard Gower (of Racey)
12. "Some Girls" by Richard Gower (of Racey)
13. "Maxine" by Sharon O'Neill & Alan Mansfield
14. "Pop Muzik" by Robin Scott (of M)
15. "Stimulation" by Paul Gray) of Wa Wa Nee)
16. "Sugar Free" by Paul Gray (of Wa Wa Nee)
17. "Take a Long Line" by Doc Neeson's Angels
18. "No Secrets" by Doc Neeson's Angels
19. "Am I Ever Gonna See Your Face Again" by Doc Neeson's Angels

CD 2

1. "I Was Only 19" by John Schumann & Hugh McDonald (of Redgum)
2. "My Sharona" by Doug Fieger (of The Knack)
3. "Quasimodo's Dream" by Dave Mason (of The Reels)
4. "I Like It Both Ways" by Supernaut
5. "Sweet Dreams" by Wolfgramm Sisters (Eurythmics song)
6. "Mamma Mia" by Wolfgramm Sisters (ABBA song)
7. "Knock On Wood" by Wolfgramm Sisters (Amii Stewart song)
8. "Vogue" by Wolfgramm Sisters (Madonna song)
9. "Lady Marmalade" by Wolfgramm Sisters (Labelle song)
10. "I Only Want to Be with You" by Les McKeown (of Bay City Rollers)
11. "Give a Little Love" by Les McKeown (of Bay City Rollers)
12. "Bye Bye Baby" by Les McKeown (of Bay City Rollers)
13. "Trust Me" by Kate Ceberano (of I'm Talking)
14. "Love Don't Live Here Anymore" by Kate Ceberano (of I'm Talking)
15. "Girls On the Avenue" by Richard Clapton
16. "Deep Water" by Richard Clapton
17. "I Am An Island" by Richard Clapton
18. "Where the Action Is" by John Paul Young
19. "Total Control" by Martha Davis (of The Motels)
20. "Only The Lonely" by Martha Davis (of The Motels)
21. "Take the L" by Martha Davis (of The Motels)
22. Medley > "It's a Long Way There" / "Reminiscing" / "Everyday of My Life" / "Curiosity (Killed the Cat)" / "The Night Owls" / "Cool Change" / "Lonesome Loser" / "Help Is on Its Way" by Beeb Birtles, Glenn Shorrock & Graeham Goble (of The Little River Band)
23. "Affair of the Heart" by Rick Springfield
24. "Don't Talk to Strangers" by Rick Springfield
25. "Speak to the Sky" by Rick Springfield
26. "Jessie's Girl" by Rick Springfield

=== Charts ===
Chart performance for The Countdown Spectacular Live 2
Chart (2007)	Peak position
Australian Albums (ARIA)	99
Australian DVD (ARIA)	14

== Awards and nominations ==
=== ARIA Music Awards ===
The ARIA Music Awards is an annual awards ceremony that recognises excellence, innovation, and achievement across all genres of Australian music. They commenced in 1987.

Year	Nominee / work	Award	Result	Ref.
2007	The Countdown Spectacular Live	Best Original Soundtrack, Cast or Show Album	Nominated	
2007	The Countdown Spectacular Live	Best Music DVD	Nominated	
2008	Countdown Spectacular 2	Best Original Soundtrack, Cast or Show Album	Nominated	

== See also ==
- Countdown (Australian TV program)
