= Photoplay (album) =

Studio album by Sherbet
- Released: June 1977
- Recorded: EMI Studios, Sydney
- Genre: Rock, pop
- Length: 35:17
- Label: Festival, Epic, Infinity, MCA, EMI
- Producer: Richard Lush, Sherbet

Sherbet chronology
The Sherbet Collection (1976)	Photoplay (1977)	Caught in the Act... Live (1977)

Singles from Photoplay
- 1. "Magazine Madonna" Released: May 1977; 2. "High Rollin'" Released: August 1977

Photoplay the sixth studio album by Australian rock band, Sherbet released in June 1977. The album peaked at number 4 on the Kent Music Report.

At the Australian 1977 King of Pop Awards the song won Most Popular Australian Album.

The album was titled Magazine in North America.

== Reception ==
Cash Box magazine said "Their soft toned harmonies smooth the rough edges when the rock gets gritty, but the overall mood is one of studied balance and control."

== Track listing ==
Side A
No.	Title	Writer(s)	Length
1.	"High Rollin'"	Tony Mitchell	3:42
2.	"Magazine Madonna"	Mitchell	4:07
3.	"Midsummer Madness"	Garth Porter, Mitchell, Harvey James	3:26
4.	"What Do You Do"	Mitchell	3:35
5.	"I Got Love"	Mitchell, Alan Sandow	3:46

Side B
No.	Title	Writer(s)	Length
1.	"Still in Love With You"	Daryl Braithwaite	3:42
2.	"Love Is Fine"	Mitchell	4:10
3.	"Let Me Flow"	Porter, Mitchell	4:35
4.	"The Way I Am"	Porter, Mitchell, Harvey James	2:39
5.	"It's a Game"	Porter, Mitchell	3:35
Total length:			35:17

== Personnel ==
- Bass, vocals – Tony Mitchell
- Drums – Alan Sandow
- Guitar, vocals – Harvey James
- Keyboards, vocals – Garth Porter
- Lead vocals – Daryl Braithwaite

Production

- Photography By – Graeme Webber
- Producer – Richard Lush, Sherbet
- Remastered By – William Bowden

== Charts ==
Chart (1977)	Peak position
Australia Kent Music Report	4

== Release history ==
Country	Date	Label	Format	Catalog
Australia	June 1977	Festival	LP, Cassette	L 36268
USA	October 1977	MCA	LP, Cassette	MCA-2304
Australia	1999	Festival	CD	D20039
