= Doug Rea =

Australian musician

Doug Rea (born 10 October 1948) is one of the founders of the Down Town Roll Band in Sydney, Australia, from which the band Sherbet was formed. Guitarist Clive Shakespeare was also one of the founders. Rea left Sherbet to perform with Maple Lace who covered the UK single "Gimme Dat Ding." Their cover version reached number 6 on the Australian music charts in 1970.

In the 1980s he relocated to Byron Shire and teamed up with Peter Jaggle. In 1991, he moved with his family to Tasmania. A car accident in 1995 meant he could not perform live whilst he recovered, but he returned to live music two years later until deciding to retire to the studio in 1999. However, he continued to play with Tasmanian musicians, Graham Austen (keyboards), Christine Brightman (vocals), and ex-Sydney guitarist Alan Andrewartha and other guitarists and musicians from time to time at Graham and Christine's studio.
