= Slipstream (Sherbet album) =

Studio album by Sherbet
- Released: September 1974
- Genre: Rock, pop
- Length: 38:32
- Label: Infinity, Festival
- Producer: Richard Batchens, Sherbet

Sherbet chronology
| On with the Show (1973) | Slipstream (1974) | In Concert (1975) |

Singles from Slipstream
- 1. "So Glad You're Mine" Released: January 1974; 2. "Slipstream" Released: May 1974; 3. "Silvery Moon" Released: August 1974

Slipstream is the third studio album by Sherbet released in September 1974 and it peaked at No. 3 in Australia and was certified gold.

== Track listing ==
Side A
| No. | Title | Writer(s) | Length |
|---|---|---|---|
| 1. | "Slipstream" | Garth Porter, Clive Shakespeare | 2:53 |
| 2. | "Endless Place" | Porter, Shakespeare | 3:38 |
| 3. | "Wild Love" | Porter, Shakespeare, Roger Davies | 3:21 |
| 4. | "Another Hustler" | Porter, Shakespeare | 3:36 |
| 5. | "What Is It All About?" | Porter, Shakespeare | 2:21 |
| 6. | "Freedom" | Porter, Shakespeare | 3:48 |

Side B
| No. | Title | Writer(s) | Length |
|---|---|---|---|
| 1. | "Silvery Moon" | Porter, Shakespeare | 3:25 |
| 2. | "Handy Mandy" | Porter, Shakespeare | 4:47 |
| 3. | "When the Sunshine Turns to Grey" | Porter, Shakespeare | 4:05 |
| 4. | "Earthquake in My Head" | Porter, Shakespeare | 3:37 |
| 5. | "So Glad You're Mine" | Porter, Shakespeare | 3:01 |
| Total length: | | | 38:32 |

== Personnel ==
- Lead vocals – Daryl Braithwaite
- Bass, vocals – Tony Mitchell
- Keyboards, vocals – Garth Porter
- Drums – Alan Sandow
- Guitar, vocals – Clive Shakespeare
- Co-producers – Richard Batchens, Sherbet
- Engineer – Richard Batchens
- Remastered by William Bowden

== Charts ==
=== Weekly charts ===
| Chart (1974/75) | Peak position |
|---|---|
| Australia (Kent Music Report) | 3 |

=== Year-end charts ===
| Chart (1974) | Peak position |
|---|---|
| Australia (Kent Music Report) | 19 |

== Certifications ==
| Region | Certification | Certified units/sales |
|---|---|---|
| Australia (ARIA) | Gold | 20,000^{^} |
^{^} Shipments figures based on certification alone.

== Release history ==
| Country | Date | Label | Format | Catalog |
|---|---|---|---|---|
| Australia | September 1974 | Festival | LP, Cassette | L35275 |
| Australia | 1999 | Festival | CD | D20025 |
