= Howzat! (album) =

Studio album by Sherbet
- Released: June 1976
- Recorded: March–May 1976
- Studio: EMI Studios, Sydney, New South Wales, Australia
- Genre: Rock, pop
- Length: 40:13
- Label: Infinity/Festival
- Producer: Sherbet, Richard Lush

Sherbet chronology
Life... Is for Living (1975)	Howzat! (1976)	The Sherbet Collection (1976)

Singles from Howzat
- 1. "Howzat" Released: May 1976; 2. "Hollywood Dreaming"/"Gimme Love" Released: July 1976

Howzat! is the fifth studio album by Australian rock band, Sherbet. released in June 1976. It spent two weeks at number one on the Australian albums chart in 1976.

At the Australian 1976 King of Pop Awards the album won Most Popular Australian Album.

== Reception ==
Cash Box magazine said "Their sound is a bit pop-ish, but the somewhat heavy-handed treatment of the instrumentation lends just enough punch to make Howzat! a solid choice for the FM programmer as well. We highly recommend the title track and 'Blueswalkin' to the progressive programmer, while 'Dancer' will supplement these just fine in the pop markets."

== Track listing ==
Side A
No.	Title	Writer(s)	Length
1.	"Howzat"	Garth Porter, Tony Mitchell	3:46
2.	"Lady of the Night"	Porter, Mitchell, Daryl Braithwaite	4:04
3.	"Gimme' Love"	Porter, Mitchell	4:01
4.	"If I Had My Way"	Porter	4:09
5.	"Hollywood Dreaming"	Porter	4:03

Side B
No.	Title	Writer(s)	Length
1.	"Dancer"	Porter, Mitchell	3:22
2.	"Blueswalkin'"	Porter, Mitchell, Alan Sandow	3:56
3.	"Motor of Love"	Porter, Mitchell, Sandow	3:24
4.	"The Swap (You Can Get the Lot)"	Porter, Mitchell, Harvey James	4:16
5.	"Can't Find True Love"	Porter, Mitchell, Sandow	2:57
6.	"I'll Be Coming Home"	Porter, Mitchell	2:15
Total length:			40:13

== Personnel ==
Sherbet

- Daryl Braithwaite – lead vocals (tracks 1–4, 6–11), tambourine (tracks 1, 3, 6), backing vocals (track 5)
- Harvey James – electric guitar, backing vocals; acoustic guitar (tracks 1, 5, 10)
- Garth Porter – clavinet (track 1, 6, 8–10), backing vocals (track 1–4, 6–11), Wurlitzer electric piano (track 2, 3, 6, 7, 8), Yamaha organ (track 3), piano (track 4, 5, 8, 10, 11), lead vocals (track 5), Hammond organ (track 7, 9), saxophone (track 7) synthesizer (track 8)
- Tony Mitchell – bass, backing vocals; ukulele (track 11)
- Alan Sandow – drums; congas (tracks 6), bongos (tracks 6), percussion (track 11), backing vocals (track 11)

== Charts ==
Weekly charts

Chart (1976/77)	Peak position
Australia (Kent Music Report)	1

Year-end charts

Chart (1976)	Peak position
Australia (Kent Music Report)	10

== Sales ==
Sales for "Howzat!"
Region	Certification	Certified units/sales
Australia	—	100,000

== Release history ==
Country	Date	Label	Format	Catalog
Australia	June 1976	Festival	LP, Cassette	L35905
United Kingdom	1976	Epic	LP, Cassette	EPC 81623
United States	1976	MCA	LP	MCA 2226
Australia	1998	Infinity, Festival Records	CD	D20034
Australia	2006	Liberation	CD+DVD	BLUE125.5
