= Silvery Moon (song) =

Single by Sherbet

from the album Slipstream
- B-side: "Summer Satisfaction"
- Released: August 1974
- Recorded: Armstrong Studios, Festival Studios
- Genre: Rock
- Length: 3:20
- Label: Infinity; Festival
- Songwriters: Garth Porter; Clive Shakespeare
- Producers: Richard Batchens; Sherbet

Sherbet singles chronology
| "Slipstream" (1974) | "Silvery Moon" (1974) | "Summer Love" (1975) |

"Silvery Moon" is a song by Australian rock band Sherbet, released in August 1974 as the third and final single from the band's third studio album, Slipstream. The song reached number 5 on the Kent Music Report.

The song was written by Garth Porter and Clive Shakespeare.

== Track listing ==
| No. | Title | Writer(s) | Length |
|---|---|---|---|
| 1. | "Silvery Moon" | Garth Porter, Clive Shakespeare | 3:20 |
| 2. | "Summer Satisfaction" | Clive Shakespeare | 2:49 |

== Personnel ==
- Daryl Braithwaite - Lead vocals
- Tony Mitchell - Bass, vocals
- Garth Porter - Keyboards, vocals
- Alan Sandow - Drums
- Clive Shakespeare - Guitar, vocals

== Charts ==
=== Weekly charts ===
| Chart (1974/75) | Peak position |
|---|---|
| Australia (Kent Music Report) | 5 |

=== Year-end charts ===
| Chart (1974) | Rank |
|---|---|
| Australia (Kent Music Report) | 44 |
