= Free the People (Sherbet song) =

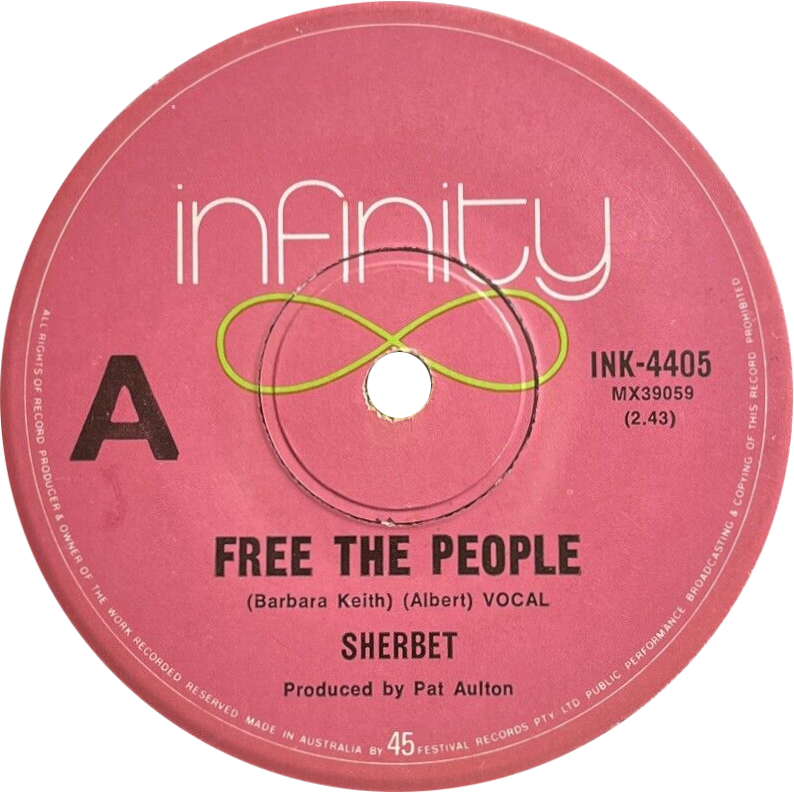
- Side A of the Australian single

Single by Sherbet

from the album Time Change... A Natural Progression
- B-side: "All Our Yesterdays"
- Released: October 1971
- Genre: Rock
- Length: 2:43
- Label: Infinity; Festival
- Songwriter: Barbara Keith
- Producer: Pat Aulton

Sherbet singles chronology
"Can You Feel It, Baby?" (1971)	"Free the People" (1971)	"You're All Woman" (1972)

"Free the People" is a song by Australian band Sherbet. It was released in October 1971 as the second single from Sherbet's debut studio album Time Change... A Natural Progression. The song charted at number 33 on Go-Set and number 18 on the Kent Music Report.

Written by American singer-songwriter Barbara Keith, the song has been recorded by Keith (1970), Delaney & Bonnie (1970), Barbra Streisand (1971), and Olivia Newton-John (1974), amongst others.

== Track listing ==
No.	Title	Writer(s)	Length
1.	"Free the People"	Barbara Keith	2:43
2.	"All Our Yesterdays"	Clive Shakespeare	2:43

== Charts ==
Chart (1971)	Peak Position
Australia (Kent Music Report)	18
Australia (Go-Set)	33

== Personnel ==
- Alan Sandow – drums, percussion, bongoes, chimes
- Daryl Braithwaite – lead vocals, tambourine, tabla
- Clive Shakespeare – guitar, vocals
- Garth Porter – keyboards, clavinet, piano, lead vocals, backing vocals, Hammond organ, electric piano, synthesiser
