= On with the Show (Sherbet album) =

Studio album by Sherbet
- Released: November 1973
- Genre: Rock, pop
- Length: 40:56
- Label: Infinity, Festival
- Producer: Tweed Harris

Sherbet chronology
| Time Change... A Natural Progression (1972) | On with the Show (1973) | Slipstream (1974) |

Singles from On with the Show
- 1. "Cassandra" Released: September 1973

On with the Show is the second studio album by Australian band, Sherbet released in November 1973. The album spent 12 weeks in the Australian charts, peaking at number #6. "Cassandra" was the only single to be released.

== Track listing ==
Side A
| No. | Title | Writer(s) | Length |
|---|---|---|---|
| 1. | "We Can Make It Right" | Garth Porter, Clive Shakespeare | 4:48 |
| 2. | "Summertime Satisfaction" | Shakespeare | 2:49 |
| 3. | "Jubilee Morning" | Porter, Shakespeare | 5:44 |
| 4. | "Cassandra" | Porter, Shakespeare | 3:19 |
| 5. | "Roll Me Over" | Shakespeare | 2:55 |

Side B
| No. | Title | Writer(s) | Length |
|---|---|---|---|
| 1. | "Chicago" | Graham Nash | 10:38 |
| 2. | "Jungle Jiver" | Porter, Shakespeare | 4:43 |
| 3. | "Sweet Valentine" | Shakespeare | 3:23 |
| 4. | "Au Revoir" | Porter, Shakespeare |
| 9. | Untitled | | 2:38 |
| Total length: | | | 40:56 |

== Personnel ==
- Alto saxophone – Ken Schroader (tracks: 5)
- Bass, vocals – Tony Mitchell
- Congas – Gary Hyde (tracks: 6)
- Drums – Alan Sandow
- Electric guitar, acoustic guitar, slide guitar, vocals – Clive Shakespeare
- Lead vocals – Daryl Braithwaite
- Organ, piano, mellotron, harpsichord, vocals – Garth Porter

== Charts ==
| Chart (1973/74) | Peak position |
|---|---|
| Australia (Go-Set Chart) | 6 |
| Australia (Kent Music Report) | 13 |

== Certifications ==
| Region | Certification | Certified units/sales |
|---|---|---|
| Australia (ARIA) | Gold | 20,000^{^} |
^{^} Shipments figures based on certification alone.

== Release history ==
| Country | Date | Label | Format | Catalog |
|---|---|---|---|---|
| Australia | November 1973 | Festival | LP | L 35007 |
| Australia | 26 October 1998 | Festival | CD | D 20020 |
