= Time Change... A Natural Progression =

Studio album by Sherbet
- Released: December 1972
- Recorded: September 1972
- Studio: TCS Studios, Melbourne & Festival Studios Sydney, Australia
- Genre: Rock, pop
- Length: 37:30
- Label: Infinity, Festival
- Producer: Howard Gable, Pat Austin, Ross Linton

Sherbet chronology
Can You Feel It Baby (EP) (1971)	Time Change... A Natural Progression (1972)	On with the Show (1973)

Singles from Time Change... A Natural Progression
- 1. "Can You Feel It, Baby?" Released: June 1971; 2. "Free The People" Released: October 1971; 3. "You're All Woman" Released: June 1972; 4. "You've Got the Gun" Released: October 1972

Time Change... A Natural Progression is the debut studio album by Sherbet released in December 1972. The album includes the bands hit singles "Can You Feel It, Baby?", "Free the People", "You're All Woman" and "You've Got the Gun". The album peaked at number 66 on the Kent Music Report.

== Track listing ==
Side A
No.	Title	Writer(s)	Length
1.	"You've Got the Gun"	Garth Porter, Clive Shakespeare, Daryl Braithwaite	5:03
2.	"Thinkin' About You"	Porter, Shakespeare, Tony Mitchell	4:09
3.	"Midnight Blues"	Porter, Shakespeare	2:57
4.	"Do It"	Porter, Shakespeare	2:13
5.	"Time Change"	Porter, Shakespeare, Braithwaite, Mitchell, Alan Sandow	5:49

Side B
No.	Title	Writer(s)	Length
1.	"Love the One You're With"	Stephen Stills	4:54
2.	"Movie Star"	Porter, Braithwaite	3:06
3.	"Can You Feel It, Baby?"	Roger Cook, Roger Greenaway	3:35
4.	"Free The People"	Barbara Keith	2:43
5.	"You're All Woman"	Ted Mulry	2:55
Total length:			37:30

== Personnel ==
- Daryl Braithwaite – vocals
- Garth Porter – organ, piano, vocals, wurlitzer electric piano
- Tony Mitchell – bass guitar, vocals
- Alan Sandow – drums
- Clive Shakespeare – guitar, vocals
- Bruce Worrall – bass guitar on "Can You Feel It Baby"

== Charts ==
Chart (1972/73)	Peak position
Australia (Kent Music Report)	66

== Certifications ==
Region	Certification	Certified units/sales
Australia (ARIA)	Gold	20,000^{^}
^{^} Shipments figures based on certification alone.

== Release history ==
Country	Date	Label	Format	Catalog
Australia	December 1972	Festival	LP	INL 34725
Australia	1975	Festival	LP (re-release), cassette	L 34725
Australia	26 October 1998	Festival	CD	D20018
