= You're All Woman =

Single by Sherbet

from the album Time Change... A Natural Progression
- B-side: "Back Home"
- Released: June 1972
- Genre: Rock
- Length: 2:55
- Label: Infinity; Festival
- Songwriter: Ted Mulry
- Producer: Ross Linton

Sherbet singles chronology
"Free the People" (1971)	"You're All Woman" (1972)	"You've Got the Gun" (1972)

"You're All Woman" is a song by Australian band Sherbet. It was released in June 1972 as the third single from Sherbet's debut studio album Time Change... A Natural Progression. The single reached at number 19 on the Kent Music Report and it also reached at number 13 on Go-Set.

== Track listing ==
No.	Title	Writer(s)	Length
1.	"You're All Woman"	Ted Mulry	2:55
2.	"Back Home"	Garth Porter	2:58

== Charts ==
Chart (1972)	Peak Position
Australia (Kent Music Report)	19
Australia (Go-Set)	13

== Personnel ==
- Alan Sandow – drums, percussion, bongoes, chimes
- Daryl Braithwaite – lead vocals, tambourine, tabla
- Clive Shakespeare – guitar, vocals
- Garth Porter – keyboards, clavinet, piano, lead vocals, backing vocals, Hammond organ, electric piano, synthesiser
- Producer - Richard Batchens (tracks: 2)
