= Richard Batchens =

- Occupations: Record producer, audio engineer, mixer
- Labels: Festival/Infinity

Richard Batchens is an Australian record producer and audio engineer. From 1971 to 1976 he was the main in-house producer for Festival Records' imprint Infinity Records. His work includes most of the early albums and singles for Sherbet, one of Australia's most successful pop bands of the 1970s, and the first six albums by singer-songwriter, Richard Clapton. He also produced some of the early Cold Chisel material, including the single, "Goodbye (Astrid Goodbye)" (1978), and their second album, Breakfast at Sweethearts (1979).

== Career ==
Richard Batchens worked in Sydney with Festival Records in-house producer, Pat Aulton, in the late 1960s. Aulton continued as main producer of Festival's pop music releases until 1973. In 1970 Festival established a new imprint label, Infinity Records, and Batchens became its main producer and engineer.

Batchens co-produced the debut album, At the Mountains of Madness (April 1971), by progressive rock and heavy rockers, Blackfeather, with their lead guitarist, John Robinson. Its associated single, "Seasons of Change" appeared in May. The material was recorded in late 1970 and featured guest appearances by two members of Fraternity, an Adelaide-based group: Bon Scott on recorder and percussion, and John Bissett on keyboards. The album reached No. 7 in the Australian national charts. The track, "Seasons of Change", had originally been written by Robinson and Neale Johns for Fraternity. It proved to be one of Blackfeather's most popular singles and became a national Top 20 hit when released, against the band's wishes, as a single. This track also crops up on Raven's Golden Miles CD compilation in 1994 along with the album track, "Long Legged Lovely".

From 1972 to 1975 he produced or co-produced five albums for pop group, Sherbet. From 1973 to 1979 he produced six albums for Richard Clapton including his first four studio albums, a soundtrack album, Highway One (1976), and a compilation album, Past Hits and Previews (1979).

Cold Chisel's debut self-titled album in 1978 had been produced by Peter Walker. For their second album, Breakfast at Sweethearts, the record company, Elektra Records, decided to use a more experienced producer. Batchens was chosen due to his work with Sherbet and Clapton. According to Australian journalist, Ed Nimmervoll, Batchens "was not all that keen on the band's individual performances in the studio and made them do things over and over". Although "he smoothed out the rough edges", however he "lost some of the life". Meanwhile, "the more sophisticated approach tended to highlight the quality of the songs". Nimmervoll noted that the "band had their reservations, but they were reasonably happy with the results". Breakfast at Sweethearts proved to be their commercial breakthrough, turning Cold Chisel into platinum selling superstars. After attempting to record a follow-up single with Batchens, Cold Chisel decided to record their next album, East (1980), with Mark Opitz producing.

=== Australian Record Awards ===
Year	Nominee / work	Award	Result
1975	Richard Batchens	Producer of the Year	Won

== Production/engineering credits ==
According to sources:

Year	Artist(s)	Title	Role	Label
1971	Heart'n'Soul	Hot Boogie Band	Engineer	Infinity
1971	The Cleves	Cleves	Producer	Infinity/Festival (SINL-934031)
1971	Blackfeather	At the Mountain of Madness, "Seasons of Change"	Co-producer with John Robinson	Infinity/Festival (L34159)
1971	Greg Quill and Country Radio	"Radio Rag"	Producer	
1971	Russell Morris	"Wings of an Eagle"	Arranger (strings)	
1971	Peter Hiscock	"A Certain Mr. Brown"	Producer	Festival (FK-4286)
1972	Sherbet	Time Change... A Natural Progression	Co-producer with Howard Gable, Pat Austin, Ross Linton	Infinity/Festival (INL 34725, L34725 LP)
1973	Sherbet	On with the Show	Producer	Infinity/Festival (L 35007)
1973	Sharon Sims	"To Be the One You Love"	Co-producer with Martin Erdman	
1973	Richard Clapton	Prussian Blue	Producer, engineer, mixer	Infinity/Festival (L 34956)
1974	Sherbet	Slipstream	Co-producer with Sherbet	Infinity/Festival (L35275 LP)
1974	Sherbet	In Concert	Producer	Infinity/Festival (L35443 LP)
1975	Sherbet	Life... Is for Living	Co-producer with Clive Shakespeare, Garth Porter	Festival (L 35652)
1975	Richard Clapton	Girls on the Avenue	Producer	Infinity/Festival (L 35508)
1975	Split Enz	Mental Notes	Engineer	Mushroom
1976	Richard Clapton	Highway One soundtrack	Producer, engineer, mixer	Festival (L 36138)
1976	Richard Clapton	Main Street Jive	Producer	Infinity/Festival (L 35963)
1977	Richard Clapton	Goodbye Tiger	Producer, mixer	Infinity/Festival (L 36352)
1977	Cold Chisel	You're Thirteen, You're Beautiful, and You're Mine (live EP)	Consultant producer	
1978	Cold Chisel	"Goodbye (Astrid Goodbye)"	Producer	Elektra (100078)
1978	Richard Clapton	Past Hits and Previews compilation	Producer	Infinity/Festival (L 36691)
1979	Cold Chisel	Breakfast at Sweethearts	Producer	Elektra (600042-1 LP)
