= Shaping Up (album) =

Studio album by The Sherbs
- Released: November 1982
- Genre: Rock, pop
- Label: Razzle, Festival

The Sherbs chronology
Defying Gravity (1981)	Shaping Up (1982)	The Hits 1969–1984 (1984)

Singles from Shaping Up
- 1. "Don't Throw It All Away" Released: August 1982; 2. "Shaping Up" Released: October 1982; 3. "The Arrow" Released: March 1983

Shaping Up is the tenth and final studio album by Australian band, The Sherbs. It was released in November 1982 and peaked at number 76 on the Kent Music Report.

== Track listing ==
Side A

1. "Shaping Up"
2. "No Holding Back (The Feeling)"
3. "Don't Throw It All Away"
4. "(I'll) Take It on the Run"

Side B

1. "The Arrow"
2. "Wild Is the Sea"
3. "I Don't Wanna Lose You"
4. "Knowing You" (Bonus track on cassette release)

== Charts ==
Chart (1982/83)	Peak position
Australia (Kent Music Report)	76
