= Life... Is for Living =

Life... Is For Living

Studio album by Sherbet
- Released: November 1975
- Recorded: 1975
- Studio: Trafalgar Studios, Armstrong Studios, Festival Studios
- Genre: Rock, pop
- Length: 36:43
- Label: Infinity, Festival
- Producer: Clive Shakespeare, Garth Porter, John L Sayers

Sherbet chronology
Greatest Hits 1970-1975 (1975)	Life... Is For Living (1975)	Howzat (1976)

Singles from Life...Is for Living
- 1. "Life" Released: August 1975; 2. "Only One You" Released: October 1975

Life... Is for Living is the fourth studio album by Sherbet released in November 1975. The album reached at number 3 on the Kent Music Report.

== Track listing ==
Side A
No.	Title	Writer(s)	Length
1.	"Arrival"	Garth Porter, Clive Shakespeare	1:56
2.	"Survival"	Porter, Shakespeare	2:03
3.	"Life"	Porter, Shakespeare	3:28
4.	"I Wanna Live"	Porter, Shakespeare	4:12
5.	"Only One You"	Porter, Shakespeare	3:46
6.	"Matter of Time"	Porter, Shakespeare	3:00

Side B
No.	Title	Writer(s)	Length
1.	"Just Being You"	Porter, Shakespeare	3:50
2.	"Bluesong"	Clive Shakespeare	2:46
3.	"I've Been in It Too Long"	Porter, Shakespeare	2:55
4.	"Where Do We Go?"	Shakespeare	4:15
5.	"Survival (Reprise)"	Porter, Shakespeare	4:32
Total length:			36:43

== Personnel ==
=== "Survival" ===
- Garth Porter – clavinet, Hammond and Yamaha combo organ, Moog
- Clive Shakespeare – guitars
- Tony Mitchell – bass guitar
- Alan Sandow – drums

=== "Life" ===
- Daryl Braithwaite – lead vocals
- Garth Porter – Mu-Tron, clavinet, Moog, organ, harmony vocals
- Clive Shakespeare – electric guitar, acoustic classical guitar, harmony vocals
- Tony Mitchell – bass guitar, harmony vocals
- Alan Sandow – drums, roto-toms

=== "I Wanna Live" ===
- Daryl Braithwaite – lead vocals
- Garth Porter – organ, clavinet, saxophones, harmony vocals
- Clive Shakespeare – slide guitars, acoustic guitars, Burns Flyte guitars, harmony vocals
- Tony Mitchell – bass guitar, harmony vocals
- Alan Sandow – drums, roto-toms, percussion
- Dalvanius and The Fascinations – harmony vocals

=== "Only One You" ===
- Daryl Braithwaite – lead vocals
- Garth Porter – Hammond and Yamaha organ, piano, string synthesizer, harmony vocals
- Clive Shakespeare – classical guitars, 12 string guitars, harmony vocals
- Tony Mitchell – bass guitar, harmony vocals
- Alan Sandow – drums
- Bruce Sandell – flute

=== "Matter of Time" ===
- Garth Porter – lead vocals, saxophones, piano
- Clive Shakespeare – electric guitar
- Tony Mitchell – bass guitar
- Alan Sandow – drums
- Daryl Braithwaite – Burns Flyte guitar
- Geoff Oakes – saxophone solo

=== "Just Being You" ===
- Daryl Braithwaite – lead vocals, tambourine
- Garth Porter – clavinet, piano, saxes, harmony vocals
- Clive Shakespeare – lead guitar, Uni-Vibe guitars, 12 string guitars, Burns Flyte guitars
- Tony Mitchell – bass guitar, harmony vocals
- Alan Sandow – drums
- Dal & Fascinations – vocals

=== "Bluesong" ===
- Tony Mitchell – bass guitar, lead vocals
- Garth Porter – Wurlitzer piano
- Clive Shakespeare – guitars, harmony vocals
- Alan Sandow – drums, gon bop congas
- Peter Jones – vibes

=== "I've Been In It Too Long" ===
- Daryl Braithwaite – vocals
- Garth Porter – lead vocals on 2nd verse, piano, saxophones
- Clive Shakespeare – ukulele, vocals, harp, kitchen sink
- Tony Mitchell – bass guitar, vocals
- Alan Sandow – lead vocals on 1st verse, drums

=== "Where Do We Go?" ===
- Daryl Braithwaite – lead vocals, tambourine
- Garth Porter – electric and grand piano, organ, saxophones, harmony vocals
- Clive Shakespeare – 12 string guitar, slide guitars, Burns Flyte guitar, harmony vocals
- Tony Mitchell – bass guitar, harmony vocals
- Alan Sandow – drums, harmony vocals
- Dal & The Fascinations – harmony vocals
- David Bronn – saxophone
- Miguel Carranza – trombone
- Bruce Sandell – flute
- Russell Smith – trumpet

=== "Survival (Reprise)" ===
- Daryl Braithwaite – vocals
- Garth Porter – electric piano, synthesizers, strings, Yamaha combo organ
- Clive Shakespeare – electric guitars, acoustic guitars
- Tony Mitchell – bass guitar
- Alan Sandow – drums
- Russell Smith – trumpet

== Charts ==
Chart (1975/76)	Peak position
Australia Kent Music Report	3

== Release history ==
Country	Date	Label	Format	Catalog
Australia	November 1975	Festival	LP, cassette	L 35652
Australia	23 August 1999	Festival	CD	D20031
