= Can You Feel It, Baby? =

Single by Sherbet

from the album Time Change... A Natural Progression
- B-side: "The Love You Save (May Be Your Own)"
- Released: June 1971
- Genre: Rock
- Length: 3:35
- Label: Infinity; Festival
- Songwriters: Roger Cook; Roger Greenaway
- Producer: Pat Aulton

Sherbet singles chronology
| "Crimson Ships" (1970) | "Can You Feel It, Baby?" (1971) | "Free the People" (1971) |

"Can You Feel It, Baby?" is the second single by Australian band Sherbet, released in June 1971. It was released as the first single from Sherbet's debut studio album Time Change... A Natural Progression. The song charted at number 22 on Go-Set and it also peaked at number 16 on the Kent Music Report. The song was written by English songwriters Roger Cook and Roger Greenaway and was originally recorded by Blue Mink appearing on their debut album in 1969.

== Track listing ==
| No. | Title | Writer(s) | Length |
|---|---|---|---|
| 1. | "Can You Feel It, Baby?" | Roger Cook, Roger Greenaway | 3:35 |
| 2. | "The Love You Save (May Be Your Own)" | Freddie Perren, Fonce Mizell, Deke Richards, Berry Gordy Jr. | 2:55 |

== Charts ==
| Chart (1971) | Peak position |
|---|---|
| Australia (Kent Music Report) | 16 |
| Australia (Go-Set) | 22 |

== Personnel ==
- Alan Sandow – drums, percussion, bongoes, chimes
- Daryl Braithwaite – lead vocals, tambourine, tabla
- Clive Shakespeare – guitar, vocals
- Garth Porter – keyboards, clavinet, piano, lead vocals, backing vocals, Hammond organ, electric piano, synthesiser
- Bruce Worrall – bass guitar
