= Roger Davies (talent manager) =

Australian music producer

- Born: 11 March 1952 (age 74); Melbourne, Victoria, Australia
- Occupations: Talent manager, record producer
- Years active: 1970–present
- Known for: Olivia Newton-John, Tina Turner, Dalbello, Cher, Janet Jackson, Joe Cocker, Sade, Pink.

Roger Davies (born 11 March 1952) is an Australian artist manager, business manager and music producer.

He has managed multiple pop and rock performers, including Sherbet (1970–1979), Olivia Newton-John (1979–1986), Tina Turner (1981–2010), Dalbello (1984), James Reyne (1986–1990), Tony Joe White (1989–2000), Janet Jackson (1989–2002), Joe Cocker (1991–2014), Sade (1991–present), M People (1997–2000), Cher (1999–present), and Pink (2001–2024).

== Biography ==
Roger Davies was born on 11 March 1952 and grew up in Melbourne, Australia. He attended Brighton Grammar School. In 1970, aged 18, Davies left his economics and politics university course to become a roadie for a progressive rock band, Company Caine.

The following year, he relocated to Sydney, where he worked for a booking agency, Consolidated Rock, which was set up by Michael Browning and Michael Gudinski.

At age 20, in October 1972, along with a fellow workmate, Michael Chugg, he set up Sunrise booking agency. Among their clients included Sherbet.

=== Sherbet (1970–1979) ===
Davies became the talent manager for the pop-rock group Sherbet, where he was impressed by the group's attitude: their "willingness to work anywhere, anytime, whatever it took." According to musicologist Ian McFarlane, "Under the direction of astute manager Roger Davies, the band also pioneered the concept of the national rock tour by undertaking arduous, cross-country treks to play in the far-flung corners of the continent. Sherbet's carefully cultivated image tended to alienate the 'serious' music fan, although the band's ability to deliver well-crafted pop music has never been in doubt."

Unusual for the time, Sherbet, under Davies' direction, established its own record label, publishing company, and merchandising company. With no previous management experience, Davies proceeded along the path he perceived successful English bands to have taken. Starting their own record label was a major achievement, and for a band to also have a merchandising company put them ahead of their time.

Sherbet evolved from a soul-based covers band into a teen-oriented pop-rock outfit, that relied mostly on original material. They had 11 singles peak in the Australian top ten. From 1975, Davies and Sherbet turned their attention to the international market. The single "Howzat" (1976) was inspired by the sport of cricket, which went to No. 1 in Australia and New Zealand. It was a top-10 hit in several European countries, including No. 4 on the UK Singles Chart. It had less chart success in the United States, where it reached No. 61 on the Billboard Hot 100. Nevertheless, its success led to an extensive international tour from 1976 to 1977.

Sherbet's foray into the US market began in 1977 with their album Photoplay, later retitled Magazine for the American market; however, it failed to chart in the US. Sherbet then signed with RSO Records and changed their name to Highway, but it had no US charting with their subsequent album, Highway 1 (1978). In mid-1979, the group disbanded and returned to Australia; nonetheless, Davies remained in America. Later on, in 1980, the band reformed as the Sherbs.

=== Olivia Newton-John (1979–1986) ===
In 1978, in Los Angeles, Roger Davies became the manager for Steve Kipner (ex–Steve and the Board, Tin Tin), a singer-songwriter, who had been in Australia during the 1960s. Davies also worked for Olivia Newton-John's then-manager, Lee Kramer. Kipner had co-written the track "Physical" for Tina Turner, another of Kramer's clients, who thought it "too obvious" and rejected it. Davies and Kramer heard Kipner's demo and offered it to Newton-John. Olivia Newton-John recorded "Physical" but felt the lyrics were "too risqué to release." In 1979, Davies took over Newton-John's management following her split with Lee Kramer.

In September 1981, "Physical" was released and provided Newton-John with an international hit. Supported by a ground-breaking video, it stayed at the top of the US charts for 10 weeks. Davies helped continue Newton-John's commercial success during the early 1980s, including her studio albums Physical (October 1981) and Soul Kiss (October 1985), and on the road with her North American Physical Tour (1982).

In April 2018, the Australian television biopic Olivia Newton-John: Hopelessly Devoted To You featured Delta Goodrem as Olivia Newton and Gyton Grantley as manager Roger Davies.

=== Tina Turner (1980–2010) ===
In 1980, Roger Davies' employer Lee Kramer became the manager of Tina Turner. Turner had divorced her husband, Ike, in March 1978, and by 1979 was without a record contract. To support herself, Turner had worked on the club circuit.

It was on the set of Olivia Newton-John's pre-recorded ABC TV Special "Hollywood Nights" in March 1980 that Davies first met Tina Turner, a performing guest on Olivia's show, which was broadcast on 14 April 1980. Later on, Tina invited Davies and Kramer to her performances at the Venetian Room at the famous Fairmont Hotel, San Francisco, in May, where "She said 'I want to get out of here and play rock venues'." Turner asked Lee Kramer to be her manager, and Roger Davies reluctantly went along with the plan. By 1981, Roger Davies was Turner's manager. Davies used his industry contacts to put together a comeback, advised Turner to drop the cabaret ensemble, and they remodeled the show into a grittier rock'n'roll showcase.

Turner's return to popularity began in the United Kingdom with a cover version of The Temptations "Ball of Confusion" (1982), and was followed by a cover of Al Green's "Let's Stay Together" (1983), which was a hit in Europe. Her major breakthrough came with "What's Love Got to Do with It" (June 1984), a track written by Terry Britten (ex–The Twilights) and Graham Lyle. Turner disliked the song and originally turned it down; however, despite her reservations, it provided her with her first Billboard Hot 100 No. 1 hit in September 1984.

Davies then booked Turner at The Ritz in New York City for a series of three gigs on 27, 28 and 29 January in 1983. One night saw the attendance of David Bowie and Capitol Records, and it was reviewed as "a hip-shaking, knee-swinging rendition of a rock song, she pauses for a deep, sweeping, bow, delivered with a diva's hauteur".

The single "Private Dancer", penned by Mark Knopfler, was released 29 May 1984, and become an international hit. The related album Private Dancer earned Turner three Grammy Awards in 1985, re-establishing her as one of the world's top rock performers. At the age of 45, Turner undertook the role of "Aunty Entity" alongside Mel Gibson in Mad Max Beyond Thunderdome, filmed in the Australian summer in 1984–1985.

In 1993, What's Love Got to Do with It, a biopic about Turner by Kurt Loder, was filmed with Angela Bassett in the lead role, and Australian singer-actor James Reyne (former lead singer of Australian Crawl) portrayed Davies. Davies was also satirically portrayed by Alec Baldwin in a sketch on Saturday Night Live when Turner guested on the program on 22 February 1997.

After a successful solo career, on 1 October 2008, Turner returned to the world stage at the age of 69 to celebrate her 50th anniversary in music with 90 live dates. The tour was captured by director David Mallet at the GelreDome in Arnhem, Netherlands, on 21 March 2009, and released by EMI later that year as Tina Live. Turner retired from performing live following the tour's conclusion on 5 May 2009, at the Sheffield Arena, England. Tina Turner died in Switzerland on 24 May 2023.

=== Dalbello (1984) ===
Roger Davies became the manager of Canadian singer-songwriter Dalbello (aka Lisa Dal Bello) after she had released her fourth album, whomanfoursays (1984). On that album, Dalbello had worked with Mick Ronson (David Bowie) as producer and musician. Davies preferred to work with other UK-based producers after a previous negative meeting with Ronson at an interview for production work for Tina Turner. According to Sam Lederman (Ronson's then-manager), "We met with Tina and Roger all day but Mick got tongue-tied, he just couldn't explain what he wanted to do."

Dalbello started to record with Rupert Hine producing, but Davies "vetoed the project and suggested that she look for another producer who might be more commercial." Dalbello provided demo versions of new material, which she had self-produced under an anagrammatic pseudonym, Bill da' Salleo. This was a ruse which convinced Davies and the label, A&R, to approve Bill da' Salleo as the producer for an album. Eventually Davies was told that Dalbello herself had self-produced the album, and Davies "began to question the strength of the album's production and commercial viability." The project was delayed, but it was finally released as she in 1987 on EMI and supported by the music video "Tango". The album included her biggest Canadian chart hits, "Tango" and "Black on Black".

=== James Reyne (1986–1990) ===
While managing Tina Turner, Davies was also the manager of Australian-based singer-songwriter James Reyne, known for his work in the rock band Australian Crawl. The eponymous album James Reyne was released on 1987 Capitol Records, with Olivia Newton-John credited on guest vocals. Hard Reyne was the follow-up album released 29 May 1989, also on Capitol Records.

Reyne later played the part of Roger Davies in the movie of Tina Turner's life-story, the semi-autobiographical 1993 film What's Love Got To Do With It. Years later, the American artist Pink saw the film and asked her record label to "arrange a meeting with the guy who managed Tina", as she wanted him to manage her. In 2001, Davies became Pink's manager.

=== Tony Joe White (1989–2000) ===
In 1989, Davies was approached by multiple artists for management, and, with Tina Turner's career consolidated, Davies agreed to manage blues singer and songwriter Tony Joe White from Louisiana, who worked with Tina Turner on the four songs he had written for her on the 1989 Foreign Affair album. Davies negotiated a record contract with Polydor for White and co-produced three albums: 1991's Closer to the Truth, 1993's The Path of a Decent Groove, and 1995's Lake Placid Blues. White is also credited on Joe Cocker's 1996 album Organic for the songs "Heart Full of Rain" and "High Lonesome Blue".

=== Janet Jackson (1989–2002) ===
Davies was approached by US lawyer Don Passman to manage Janet Jackson, who at the time was a successful MTV artist being managed by her father. As Tina Turner had moved to Europe and was wanting to slow down, Davies agreed to manage Janet Jackson, confident he could take her to a new level.

The first project they worked on was Jackson's fourth album, 1989's Janet Jackson's Rhythm Nation 1814 album and tour. The record on A&M Records was ambitious, with a social slant, very different from what Jackson had done before. It reached No. 1 on the US Billboard 200 and was certified six times platinum, eventually selling 14 million copies worldwide. It was certified as the best-selling album of the year in 1990, winning multiple music awards, and the corresponding video won a Grammy at the 32nd Annual Grammy Awards for Best Music Video, Long Form.

Billboard confirmed the album "launched an unprecedented seven singles to the top five of the Billboard Hot 100 in 1989–91. Four of those titles — "Miss You Much," "Escapade," "Black Cat" and "Love Will Never Do (Without You)" — hit number one, while "Rhythm Nation" and "Come Back to Me" reached the runner-up rank".

The subsequent Rhythm Nation World Tour 1990, the artist's first-ever tour, became the most successful debut tour by any recording artist. It played to over 2 million people, grossing $28 million in the US alone.

In 1991, following the success of Rhythm Nation 1814, Davies negotiated a highly publicized multimillion-dollar contract with Virgin Records, citing Janet as the highest-paid female recording artist in contemporary music. The following year, Janet recorded her next album Janet, released in 1993; it debuted at No. 1 on the Billboard 200, and the album's No. 1 hit single "That's the Way Love Goes" won a Grammy award for Best R&B song and sat at number one for eight consecutive weeks. The album was certified six times platinum, with worldwide sales exceeding 20 million copies.

In 1997, Davies launched the Velvet Rope album, which reached top-five status on global record charts. It debuted at No. 1 on the Billboard 200 and was certified triple platinum. Janet embarked on The Velvet Rope Tour, selling out stadiums across North America, Europe, Japan, Australia, and New Zealand. The concert was filmed for an HBO broadcast and received over 15 million viewers, surpassing the ratings of the four major networks and winning an Emmy for outstanding technical direction/camera work. The show was a massive production of theatrics and pyrotechnics, and the video, produced by Davies, has been judged by multiple critics to portray the most influential choreography and setting of any music video, achieving legendary status.

The album All for You was released in April 2001. It entered at No. 1 on the Billboard 200 with 605,000 copies sold, the highest first-week sales of her career. The title song broke the overall airplay debut record with a first-week audience of 70 million. It topped the Hot 100 for seven weeks, also reaching the top ten in 11 countries. The album was certified double platinum, selling 9 million copies worldwide.

In July 2001, Janet embarked on the All for You Tour in Hawaii. On the final night, the show was filmed and broadcast as a concert special for HBO, drawing an audience of 12 million viewers. The special was nominated for an Emmy Award, and the subsequent video was a major hit, reaching No. 1 in Australia.

=== Joe Cocker (1991–2014) ===
Davies started managing Joe Cocker in August 1991 after seeing Cocker perform at The Greek Theater, Los Angeles on Monday 22 July 1991. Although Davies and Joe Cocker had already crossed paths through EMI Records as label mates, Joe Cocker and Tina Turner were often on the same bill on European festivals during the 1980s.

Cocker had a checkered history, but, with good management and Cocker's dedication to his career, he recorded 10 albums under Davies' stewardship, and toured extensively. Davies was also instrumental in the management of Joe Cocker's back catalogue.

At the 1993 Brit Awards, Joe Cocker was nominated for Best British Male Artist.

Davies is first credited as a producer on Cocker's 1994 Have A Little Faith album.

On 3 June 2002, Joe Cocker performed at the Golden Jubilee of Elizabeth II and later was awarded the Order of the British Empire (OBE) at Buckingham Palace in the Queen's 2007 Birthday Honours list, and he subsequently was given the keys to his hometown, the City of Sheffield.

Cocker had a significant following in Europe, and the signing of a record deal with Sony Germany in 2005 revitalized his career. His final two albums were with Sony, supported with extensive festivals and arenas in Europe, Russia, North America, South America, Australia and New Zealand. Cocker completed his sell-out Fire It Up Live European arena tour in 2013, and it was filmed for Sony Germany at Lanxess Arena, Cologne, Germany, in April 2013.

Cocker died the following year at home at Mad Dog Ranch, Colorado, on 22 December 2014.

In 2017, a feature-length documentary, Joe Cocker: Mad Dog With Soul was released.

=== Sade (1991–present) ===
Davies added the British band Sade to his management list after an approach from the band's lawyer in London in March 1991.

The first album under Davies’ management was Love Deluxe, the band's fourth album released on Sony in 1992, which charted in the top 10 in several countries and achieved quadruple platinum status in the US. The album was the basis for the Love Deluxe World Tour, and the single "No Ordinary Love" won a Grammy Award for best R&B performance.

Sade's released The Best of Sade on 31 October 1994, and went on to become quadruple platinum in the US.

November 2000 the band released their fifth studio album, Lovers Rock, attaining triple platinum status and winning a Grammy Award for best pop vocal album in 2002. A North American tour followed, and was filmed at the Arrowhead Pond, Anaheim, California on 20 September 2001 and at the Great Western Forum, Inglewood, California on 21 September 2001 as part of the band's Lovers Rock Tour. Davies is credited as management on the Lovers Live CD/DVD released March 2002.

After an extended break, Sade's sixth studio album, Soldier of Love, was released February 2010. It debuted at No. 1 in 16 countries, including the US. The title track won the Grammy Award for Best R&B performance by a group.

In May 2011, the band's second compilation album was released, The Ultimate Collection, on Sony Music, and Sade toured for the first time in 11 years. The Soldier of Love Tour was a state-of-the-art production with 21 arena dates in Europe, commencing in Nice, France, on 29 April 2011, followed by 54 dates in North America, and arena dates in Chile, Argentina, and Brazil. The band returned to Europe for 15 more shows and ended the year with dates in Australia, New Zealand, their final date was Yas Arena, Abu Dhabi, on 16 December 2011. The tour was captured on film by director Sophie Muller and released on Sony as Bring Me Home: Live 2011; Roger Davies is credited as a producer. The film was nominated for a Grammy in 2012. Sade have not performed live since their 2011 tour.

=== M People (1997–2000) ===
Davies began managing Mike Pickering's British dance music band M People in 1997, with the recording of their fourth and final non-compilation album, Fresco, charting in September 1997 in the UK at No. 2 and being certified platinum. The following year, 1998, M People released the compilation album The Best of M People, which went on to sell 2 million copies, peaking at No. 2 and achieving triple platinum status.

=== Cher (1999–present) ===
Davies started managing Cher in 1999 after her international hit "Believe" thrust Cher back into the spotlight, and he is credited on Cher's 2002 album Living Proof, which was released on Warner Bros. Records. Davies set up Cher's 1999 world tour, Do You Believe?, as well as her record-breaking Living Proof: The Farewell Tour (later dubbed The Never Can Say Goodbye Tour) in 2002. Initially scheduled for 49 shows, the Living Proof tour was extended several times worldwide, finally ending in April 2005 after 325 shows—the highest-grossing music tour by a female artist at the time. The enduring tour was filmed for broadcast as Cher: The Farewell Tour by David Mallet, with Roger Davies credited as executive producer, and it received four wins and three nominations at the 55th Primetime Emmy Awards in 2003. Cher continues to work, record, and perform globally.

=== P!nk (2001–2024) ===
Davies hasworked with American singer-songwriter Pink. He took over her management starting with her second album, 2001's Missundaztood, where the album liner notes credit RD Worldwide Management. Pink was unhappy with her direction and reportedly had little control over her first album, so she enlisted the help of singer-songwriter Linda Perry (4 Non Blondes) for her next, more personal second album. Davies had been impressed enough with Pink's presence in her first video to review her debut album (which he also reportedly did not like), but when he heard some of the early songs Pink wrote with Perry, he was intrigued:

"She not only sang the tracks, but she acted them out. She said, 'This song is going to be the first single, and this is how the video should be.' By then I knew I wanted to manage her. I told her that she was taking a huge risk by changing her sound, but she knew that. She was just fearless." Davies' and Pink's determination and courageous gamble paid off extensively and launched her career into the stratosphere. Her second album proved a tremendous hit, with worldwide sales of over 16 million, winning over critics and fans alike and earning Pink two Grammy nominations, and the single "Get the Party Started" became a top-five US hit.

Pink's 2003 third album, Try This, sold over 3 million copies worldwide and earned Pink her second Grammy Award for her song "Trouble"; Roger Davies is listed in the management credits as well as one of the executive producers.

Her fourth album, 2006's I'm Not Dead, sold over 6 million copies worldwide; the album credits include a note from Pink that said: "Roger Davies, you are a force, a treat to be around. Thank you for your energy and support". The tour of the same name smashed attendance records in Australia and Europe for a solo female artist, playing 138 shows and grossing $42 million.

In 2009, Pink's fifth album, Funhouse, outsold her "I'm Not Dead" album and produced the hit singles "So What" and "Sober". Within the album credits, Davies is mentioned again: "Roger, when I think of you, I automatically feel better, safer, and smarter, and full of love and gratitude. Thank you for that. I feel like I won the lottery with you". Her Funhouse Tour sold out frequently and played to over 1.5 million people at 151 arena dates worldwide, grossing over $100 million, including $55 million in Australia alone, shattering box-office records for the country; and, in 2010, she followed it up with her Funhouse Summer Carnival Tour, playing 34 European stadium and festival shows in 14 countries in 12 weeks, adding a further one million fans in attendance.

Pink's seventh album, 2012's The Truth about Love, included 5 hit singles and a sold-out worldwide tour from 2013 to 2014.

Album seven, 2017's Beautiful Trauma, which included the hit single "What About Us", lists Davies along with Pink as executive producers, and within the liner notes written by Pink includes the following: "Thank you Roger Davies, for being a sounding board, a coach, a mentor, a priest, and a friend. My life is made up of memories and you are a huge part of my highlight reel, and even though you don't like to be in the picture, you're standing not far from all them. This is where it's at, at least it fucking used to be." The album released October 2017 was number one over eight countries.

Pink's eighth studio album, Hurts 2B Human, was released in April 2019, and the back page of the artwork booklet lists many thank-you notes, including "Roger Davies, I love you with all my heart". The album's lead single, "Walk Me Home", was released on 20 February 2019. On the release date, Pink performed the song alongside a medley of her biggest hits at the BRIT Awards, including "Try", "Just Give Me a Reason" and "What About Us". She was also awarded with the Outstanding Contribution to Music Award at the ceremony.

Pink has continued to record and tour globally. Her extensive stadium tour in 2019, Beautiful Trauma World Tour won Pollstar's Artist of the Year 2019. and became the second-highest-grossing tour of all time by a female solo artist, the highest-grossing tour of the 2010s by a female artist, and the tenth-highest-grossing tour of all time, earning $397.3 million and selling over 3 million tickets. Pink is currently touring Summer Carnival, her ongoing eighth concert tour. It began 7 June 2023, at the University of Bolton Stadium in Bolton, England and will finish in Miami, United States on 23 November 2024. It is in support of her ninth studio album Trustfall (2023).

Pink described her Davies in 2012:

I can say this factually and not opinion – the best manager in the business. He's the most respected person I've ever met. He has also been in the game for so many years and he still is the guy carrying your bags through the airport. He's my biggest cheerleader. After every night he's at the soundboards with me and he's checking my sound and making sure my outfit fits correctly. He's just helping me through all of this because he manages people like Sade, Cher, Tina Turner and Joe Cocker – legends who've been touring forever. He's believed in me and he's kept me going when I didn't have it in me for myself. He's a wealth of experience. I find myself wanting to impress him even more.

== Awards ==
=== 2008 APRA Awards ===
Davies was honoured by the Australian music industry. Famed within the music industry for his incredible career, he was awarded one of their highest accolades – the Ted Albert Award for Outstanding Services to Music. The award was presented at the Australasian Performing Right Association (APRA) awards ceremony in Sydney Australia on 16 June 2008.

=== 2017 ARIA Icon Award ===
Davies was presented with a special ARIA Icon Award by Pink via video, after he was unable to be present at the special pre-award ARIA chairman's event hosted by ARIA chairman Denis Handlin and ARIA CEO Dan Rosen.

=== 2026 Transformer Award at the Resonator Awards, Los Angeles. ===
Cher virtually presented the Transformer Award to Davies at the 2026 Resonator Awards.

== Current work ==
With his company, RDWM / RD Worldwide Management / Roger Davies Worldwide Management, Davies continues to manage the artists Cher and Sade.
