= Richard Lush (sound engineer) =

Australian recording engineer and producer

Richard Lush is a British-born Australian recording engineer and producer. He began his career in the mid-1960s as an assistant engineer at the EMI Abbey Road Studios in London.

Working alongside producer Sir George Martin and senior engineer Geoff Emerick, Lush participated in nearly one hundred Beatles recording sessions and he is credited as Second Engineer on all tracks of the Sgt Pepper's Lonely Hearts Club Band album.

Lush moved to Australia in the 1970s. In 1975, he took over from Richard Batchens as the producer for leading Australian pop band Sherbet; among his credits with them is the group's Australian Number 1 hit "Howzat" (1976), which was also a top 10 hit in the UK.

He produced the single "Night People" / "Superstar" for Herb McQuay which was recorded at Mandrill Studios in Auckland.

Among his more recent credits, Lush engineered and/or mixed numerous tracks for the official CD album of music from the Sydney 2000 Olympics, released by Sony Music Australia.

== Awards ==
=== King of Pop Awards ===
The King of Pop Awards were voted by the readers of TV Week. The King of Pop award started in 1967 and ran through to 1978.

Year	Nominee / work	Award	Result
1976	himself	Best Australian Record Producer	Won

== Disability ==
In 2009, Lush was diagnosed with life-threatening spinal dural arteriovenous fistula and experienced loss of function in his limbs. In a 2010 article in The Australian which was accompanied by a headline describing Lush as a "survivor back at his desk", music journalist Iain Shedden wrote of how Lush still continues to work in his wheelchair at recording studios like Sydney's Studios 301 with recording artists such as Mark Isaacs.
