= Harvey James =

English-Australian rock guitarist

- Born: Harvey William James Harrop; 20 September 1952; Sheffield, England
- Origin: Adelaide, South Australia, Australia
- Died: 15 January 2011 (aged 58) Melbourne, Victoria, Australia
- Genres: Rock; pop
- Occupation: Musician
- Instruments: Guitar; backing vocals
- Years active: 1972–2010
- Formerly of: Sayla; Mississippi; Ariel; Sherbet, the Party Boys

Harvey James born Harvey William James Harrop (20 September 1952 – 15 January 2011) was an English-Australian rock guitarist. He was a member of the bands Mississippi (1973–74), Ariel (1974–75), Sherbet (1976–80, 1980–81) and the Party Boys (1982–83). James was diagnosed with lung cancer in July 2010 and died on 15 January 2011, aged 58, leaving behind his three children, Gabriel, Alexandra and Joshua.

== Early life ==
Harvey James was born in Sheffield, England as Harvey William James Harrop on 20 September 1952 to James William and Vera Harrop (née Smith). He had an elder sister, Veronica. The family migrated to Australia in July 1964 via aeroplane. He attended Lyndale High School and joined a local group, Sayla, on guitar with John Lee on drums.

== Mississippi ==
In March 1973 James (ex-Clydehouse, Sayla) joined harmony pop group, Mississippi to replace Kerryn Tolhurst on lead guitar, alongside Beeb Birtles on guitar and vocals, Graeham Goble on guitar and vocals, Derek Pellicci on drums and Charlie Tumahai on bass guitar. He played on the band's hit single, "Will I" (early 1974), and was part of their appearance at Sunbury Pop Festival in January 1974. Mississippi sailed to the United Kingdom in April 1974, working on the Sitmar Line ship, Fairsky, but stagnated there soon after arriving. Back in Australia James left the group in June, while Birtles and Goble reconstituted the band, with Pellicci, in early 1975 recruiting new members and changing their name to Little River Band.

== Ariel ==
James, on guitar, joined progressive rock group, Ariel, in July 1974, in Melbourne, with former bandmate, Lee on drums, Bill Putt on bass guitar and Mike Rudd on guitar and vocals. He returned to the UK with that group in October, where they recorded their second album, Rock & Roll Scars (1975), at Abbey Road Studios. They returned to Australia in early 1975, by which time the band had added a fifth member, singer-guitarist, Glyn Mason. That line-up recorded another album, Goodnight Fiona (1976) and issued a single, "I'll Take You High", in January of that year.

== Sherbet ==
James joined a pop band, Sherbet (also performed as Highway and as the Sherbs), in Sydney in early 1976 to replace Gunther Gorman (ex-Home), on lead guitar, backing vocals and slide guitar. His first recording with the group was their biggest hit single, "Howzat" (May 1976), which peaked at No. 1 on the Kent Music Report Australian singles chart and reached the Top 5 on the UK Singles Chart. The group's first performance with James was at Canberra's Albert Hall on 25 June. Tony Catterall of The Canberra Times observed that, with James on guitar, "the band now has a lead instrument capable of carrying the load that hard rock imposes." James co-wrote subsequent singles, "Rock Me Gently" (1976), "Beg Steal and Borrow" (1978) and "Angela" (1979), with various band members. He remained with the group until late 1982. James returned to Sherbet for various reunions (including alongside his predecessor, their original guitarist, Clive Shakespeare).

In 1979, during Sherbet's hiatus, he was a member of Marc Hunter and the Romantics, which backed Hunter on his solo album, Fiji Bitter (November 1979) and for the associated tour. In 1982, after leaving Sherbet, James became an original member of the Party Boys, a Sydney-based cover versions group, with Graham Bidstrup on drums, Kevin Borich on lead guitar, Paul Christie on bass guitar, drums and backing vocals and James Reyne on lead vocals (on loan from Australian Crawl). James played on the Party Boys' first two live albums, Live at Several 21sts (March 1983) and Greatest Hits (of Other People) (November 1983). He also participated in a reunion of Ariel in August 1997.

== Illness and death ==
James was diagnosed with lung cancer in July 2010. A benefit gig, Gimme That Guitar, was organised by friends and supporters, in Melbourne on 18 November. James performed with a reformed line-up of Ariel. A second concert had been planned for Sydney on 17 February 2011. However, Harvey James died on 15 January 2011, aged 58. He was survived by his three children from his first marriage, Gabriel, Alexandra and Joshua

His family wrote, "Dad passed away peacefully at 8.15pm tonight. We would like to thank everybody for all the wonderful support over the past 6 months. The love has been overwhelming. Rest in peace my gorgeous, funny, amazing father. We will miss you everyday forever." Sherbet lead singer, Daryl Braithwaite, posted a message, "Rest in peace Harvey James, you will be sadly missed by everyone that saw you play and knew you. My condolences to your family and friends."
