= Cassandra (Sherbet song) =

Single by Sherbet

from the album On with the Show
- B-side: "Time Change"
- Released: September 1973
- Studio: Armstrong Studios, T.C.S Studios, Festival Records
- Genre: Rock
- Length: 3:16
- Label: Infinity; Festival
- Songwriters: Garth Porter; Clive Shakespeare
- Producer: Tweed Harris

Sherbet singles chronology
| "Hound Dog" (1973) | "Cassandra" (1973) | "So Glad You're Mine" (1974) |

"Cassandra" is a song by Australian band Sherbet, released in September 1973 as the first and only single from Sherbet's second studio album, On with the Show. The song was written by Sherbet members Garth Porter and Clive Shakespeare. "Cassandra" peaked at number 5 on Go-Set and it also peaked at number 9 on the Kent Music Report.

== Track listing ==
| No. | Title | Writer(s) | Length |
|---|---|---|---|
| 1. | "Cassandra" | Garth Porter, Clive Shakespeare | 3:16 |
| 2. | "Time Change" | Porter, Shakespeare, Daryl Braithwaite, Tony Mitchell, Alan Sandow | 5:49 |

== Personnel ==
- Bass, vocals – Tony Mitchell
- Drums – Alan Sandow
- Electric guitar, acoustic guitar, slide guitar, vocals – Clive Shakespeare
- Lead vocals – Daryl Braithwaite
- Organ, piano, mellotron, harpsichord, vocals – Garth Porter

Production

- Howard Gable - (tracks 2)

== Charts ==
| Chart (1973/74) | Peak position |
|---|---|
| Australia (Go-Set) Chart | 5 |
| Australia (Kent Music Report) | 9 |
