= You've Got the Gun =

Single by Sherbet

from the album Time Change... A Natural Progression
- B-side: "Do It"
- Released: October 1972
- Genre: Rock
- Length: 3:10 (single edit); 3:56 (1976 version); 5:03 (album version)
- Label: Infinity; Festival
- Songwriters: Garth Porter; Clive Shakespeare; Daryl Braithwaite
- Producer: Howard Gable

Sherbet singles chronology
"You're All Woman" (1972)	"You've Got the Gun" (1972)	"Hound Dog" (1973)

"You've Got the Gun" is a song by Australian band Sherbet. It was released in October 1972 as the fourth and final single from Sherbet's debut studio album Time Change... A Natural Progression. The song was written by Sherbet band members Garth Porter, Clive Shakespeare, Daryl Braithwaite. The song reached at number 29 on Go-Set and number 27 on the Kent Music Report.

== Track listing ==
No.	Title	Writer(s)	Length
1.	"You're Got the Gun"	Garth Porter, Clive Shakespeare, Daryl Braithwaite	3:10
2.	"Do It"	Porter, Shakespeare	2:14

== Charts ==
Chart (1972)	Peak position
Australia (Go-Set) Chart	29
Australia (Kent Music Report)	27

== Personnel ==
- Alan Sandow – drums, percussion, bongoes, chimes
- Daryl Braithwaite – lead vocals, tambourine, tabla
- Clive Shakespeare – guitar, vocals
- Garth Porter – keyboards, clavinet, piano, lead vocals, backing vocals, Hammond organ, electric piano, synthesiser
