= Summer Love (Sherbet song) =

- The single cover of "Summer Love", featuring the Sherbet members. Front row (from left): Tony Mitchell, Daryl Braithwaite, Clive Shakespeare; back row: Garth Porter, Alan Sandow

Single by Sherbet
- B-side: "(You Go Your Way) I'll Go Mine"
- Released: March 1975
- Genre: Pop rock, soft rock
- Length: 3:33
- Label: EMI
- Songwriter(s): Garth Porter, Clive Shakespeare

Sherbet singles chronology
"Silvery Moon" (1974)	"Summer Love" (1975)	"Freedom" (1975)

"Summer Love" is a song by Australian pop group, Sherbet and was released in March 1975. It became their first number-one hit on the Australian Kent Music Report Singles Chart. The song was promoted on the newly aired ABC TV pop series, Countdown, which gave it wide exposure. From early 1975 the group made more appearances on the show than any other band in the programme's history. In October, at the King of Pop Awards, "Summer Love" won the Most Popular Australian Single, the band won Most Popular Australian Group and their lead singer, Daryl Braithwaite, won the King of Pop award.

On the Kent Music Report's 1975 End of the Year Singles Chart it appeared at No. 4 and was the highest placed single by an Australian artist. "Summer Love" was the first Sherbet single issued in the United Kingdom, and was their only release on EMI. Sherbet had signed a one-off deal for "Summer Love" with EMI – rival to their regular label Festival Records. This was a ploy to gain leverage when negotiating a more favourable contract. After "Summer Love" peaked at No. 1, Sherbet re-signed with Festival which issued their subsequent material on the group's own Razzle and Sherbet labels. The B-side was "(You Go Your Way) I'll Go Mine", which was written by the band's bass guitarist, Tony Mitchell. Braithwaite covered "Summer Love" as a solo artist. In March 2001 it was performed live by an ensemble group – which included a reunited Sherbet – at the Gimme Ted tribute and benefit concert for fellow 1970s artist, Ted Mulry.

== Track listing ==
No.	Title	Writer(s)	Length
1.	"Summer Love"	Garth Porter, Clive Shakespeare	3:33
2.	"(You Go Your Way) I'll Go Mine"	Anthony Mitchell	3:12

== Charts ==
=== Weekly charts ===
Chart (1975)	Position
Australia (Kent Music Report)	1

=== Year-end charts ===
Chart (1975)	Peak position
Australia (Kent Music Report)	4

== Personnel ==
Sherbet members

- Daryl Braithwaite – lead vocals
- Tony Mitchell – bass guitar, backing vocals
- Garth Porter – keyboards, piano, backing vocals
- Clive Shakespeare – guitar, backing vocals
- Alan Sandow – drums, percussion
