= Howzat (song) =

- Side A of the Australian single

Single by Sherbet

from the album Howzat!
- B-side: "Motor of Love"
- Released: May 1976
- Genre: Pop rock
- Length: 3:43
- Label: Infinity (Festival sublabel), Epic, MCA
- Songwriters: Garth Porter, Tony Mitchell
- Producers: Richard Lush, Sherbet

Sherbet singles chronology
"Child's Play" (1976)	"Howzat" (1976)	"Hollywood Dreaming"/"Gimme Love" (1976)

Music video
- "Howzat" on YouTube

"Howzat" is a song by Australian band Sherbet, released in May 1976. The song reached number 1 in Australia on the Kent Music Report and it also reached number 1 in New Zealand on the Recorded Music NZ. It was released from Sherbet's album of the same name, Howzat. The song was written by band members Garth Porter and Tony Mitchell. The title track remains the group's biggest hit, especially outside of Australia, reaching the top 5 of the UK charts and also entering the lower end of the US Billboard Hot 100 chart.

At the Australian 1976 King of Pop Awards the song won Most Popular Australian Single.

In January 2018, as part of Triple M's "Ozzest 100", the 'most Australian' songs of all time, "Howzat" was ranked number 42.

== Title track ==
It is often used as a cricket anthem and is sometimes loudly played by ground organisers at limited-overs matches. Howzat ("How is that?") is a cry used by cricketers when appealing to the umpire for a wicket.

== Song origin ==
In 1976, someone suggested to Tony Mitchell and keyboardist Garth Porter that Howzat might make a good title for a song because some of the members of Sherbet loved cricket. Despite Mitchell not being a good cricketer, he sat down with Garth Porter at Porter's Rose Bay home to work on the idea. Mitchell soon came up with the "doo-doo, doo-doo" bass riff, after which the first thing that came into Porter's mind was the phrase "I caught you out."

== Reception and legacy ==
Cash Box magazine said "The song is refreshing, with a subdued, economical arrangement, and professional, pleasing vocals. Should be top ten in no time at all. Good use of minor chords."

In November 2023, the National Film and Sound Archive added Howzat to the Sounds of Australia register for songs of "cultural, historical and aesthetic significance and relevance".

== Track listing ==
No.	Title	Writer(s)	Length
1.	"Howzat"	Garth Porter, Tony Mitchell	3:43
2.	"Motor of Love"	Garth Porter, Tony Mitchell, Alan Sandow	3:21

== Personnel ==
- Daryl Braithwaite – lead vocals, tambourine
- Harvey James – guitar, vocals
- Tony Mitchell – bass, vocals
- Alan Sandow – drums
- Garth Porter – keyboards, vocals

== Charts ==
=== Weekly charts ===
Chart (1976)	Peak position
Australia (Kent Music Report)	1
New Zealand (Recorded Music NZ)	1
South Africa (Springbok Radio)	1
UK Singles Chart	4
US Billboard Hot 100	61
Thailand Thailand Top 100	2
Israel Music Chart	1
Netherlands Dutch Top 40	6
Norway VG-lista	8

=== Year-end charts ===
Chart (1976)	Peak position
Australia (Kent Music Report)	4

== Certifications ==
Region	Certification	Certified units/sales
United Kingdom (BPI)	Silver	250,000^{^}
^{^} Shipments figures based on certification alone.
