= Ted Mulry =

English-Australian singer, songwriter and guitarist (1947–2001)

- Also known as: Steve Ryder
- Born: Martin Albert Mulry; 2 September 1947; Oldham, Lancashire, England
- Origin: Sydney, New South Wales, Australia
- Died: 1 September 2001 (aged 53) Sydney, New South Wales, Australia
- Genres: Hard rock; soft rock; rock and roll
- Occupations: Singer-songwriter, musician
- Instruments: Vocals, bass guitar, guitar
- Years active: 1969−2001
- Labels: Alberts/EMI; Blue Mountain

Martin Albert Mulry (2 September 1947 – 1 September 2001), known professionally as Ted Mulry, was an English-born Australian singer, songwriter, bass player and guitarist. As a solo artist, his second single, "Falling in Love Again" (February 1971), reached No. 11 on the Go-Set National Top 60.

From September 1972 he led his own band, Ted Mulry Gang, which were also credited as TMG. They had a number-one hit single on the Kent Music Report with "Jump in My Car" (September 1975) and top ten appearances with a cover version of "Darktown Strutters' Ball" (February 1976), and with "Jamaica Rum" (January 1977) and "My Little Girl" (May). Their second album, Struttin' (May 1976), also reached the top ten.

The group disbanded in 1986, although periodically reformed. Mulry announced in February 2001 that he had been diagnosed with a terminal brain tumour. In the next month numerous music artists responded with Gimme Ted, a series of benefit concerts, which were recorded for a 2×DVD video tribute album, Gimme Ted – The Ted Mulry Benefit Concerts (May 2003). Mulry died of his brain tumour in September 2001.

== Early career ==
Martin Albert Mulry was born on 2 September 1947 in Oldham, Lancashire, England. His younger brother, Steve Mulry, was also a musician. Mulry started learning guitar from the age of ten. On 5 April 1966, Mulry arrived in Sydney as a cotton weaver intending to work at Carinya Farm inBargo. By 1969, he was working for the Department of Main Roads, driving a bulldozer.

He sent a demo tape of his own compositions to Albert Productions in Sydney, intending to gain work as a songwriter, but the company persuaded him to release his own recordings. He gained notice as a solo singer-songwriter with his pop ballad, "Julia" (February 1970), which reached the Go-Set National Top 40 in mid-May. However, the single's airplay and charting was adversely affected by the 1970 radio ban, which arose from a dispute about the payment of royalties, and prevented commercial radio from broadcasting some works, including Mulry's. Mulry's next single, "Falling in Love Again" (February 1971), written by Vanda & Young (ex-the Easybeats), reached No. 11.

During his solo career, Mulry was typically backed by ad hoc groups. For the Canberra Day Pop Concert, in March 1971, the line-up consisted of local musicians Russ Corkhill on piano and organ, Bob Martin on guitar, Paul Reynolds on bass guitar, and Tony Simon on drums. In June of that year, he supported visiting English pop group, the Kinks at a performance in Canberra. He used the same backing musicians, who The Canberra Times' Michael Foster described as "very good Canberra musicians." He also felt that, "best of his presentations were probably 'Julia' and 'Louisa', with everyone happy to hear 'Falling in Love Again'. I would have enjoyed 'Take Me Back', if it had finished when the statement had been made."

After releasing his debut solo album, Falling in Love Again (September 1971), Mulry returned to England in the following month. While there he issued a single, "Ain't It Nice" (May 1972), for the Blue Mountain label, under the name of "Steve Ryder"'. It did not chart and he had returned to Sydney by mid-1972. Mulry was a prolific songwriter and provided material for other artists, including John Farnham and Alison MacCallum. Pop band Sherbet had a top 20 hit with a cover version of his song, "You're All Woman" (August 1972). He issued his second solo album, I Won't Look Back (February 1973). Australian musicologist, Ian McFarlane, described how "[it] featured a rockier sound than heard on [his] early singles, and augured well for the future."

== Ted Mulry Gang ==
Mulry, on lead vocals and, initially, on rhythm guitar, formed his own backing group in Sydney, which became Ted Mulry Gang (TMG), in September 1972. Other founders were Les Hall on lead guitar, Steve Hart on bass guitar and Herman Kovacs on drums. Hall and Kovacs had been members of a "popular suburban dance band", the Velvet Underground (not the US band of the same name), which had formed in Newcastle in 1967 and had relocated to Sydney in 1969. They had previously included Malcolm Young (later of AC/DC) on rhythm guitar. One of TMG's first performances was in September 1972 at the Mattara Festival, Newcastle. Hall, Hart and Kovacs backed Mulry on ABC-TV's popular music series, GTK, in 1973 to promote his own version of "You're All Woman".

During a 1974 gig Hart stormed out leaving his bass guitar behind, Mulry picked up the instrument and finished the show on vocals and bass guitar. Ted Mulry Gang signed with Albert Productions in that year and released their first album, Here We Are (November 1974). Before the album appeared they recruited Gary Dixon on rhythm guitar (ex-Fat Harry). It reached the Kent Music Report top 100 albums chart. Its first single, "Sunday Evenings" (March 1975), also appeared in the lower reaches of the singles chart top 100. Due to low sales the record company wanted Mulry to go back to his solo career, however, with his band's support he adopted a harder rocking style.

Their first major hit, and the biggest of their career, was the next single, "Jump in My Car" (September 1975), which spent six weeks at No. 1. According to McFarlane, "[it] set the tone for subsequent releases with its simplistic, 12-bar boogie guitar riffs, thumping beat, Mulry's gravelly, gregarious vocals and tongue-in-cheek lyrics." Over the next two years they achieved a string of top ten singles including a rocked up version of an old jazz song, "Darktown Strutters' Ball" (February 1976); followed by "Jamaica Rum" (January 1977) and "My Little Girl" (May).

Many of TMG's songs, including "Jump in My Car", were co-written by Mulry and Hall. By 1980, their chart success had ended but they remained popular performers on the Australian pub circuit until disbanding in 1986. With his music career side-lined, Mulry started a business with his mechanic. In 1989, the Ted Mulry Gang briefly reformed, with Mulry, Hall and Kovacs joined by sometime Rose Tattoo guitarist Mick Cocks. They released an album, Re-Union for Albert, on Sony. That marked their first on compact disc. Other CD reissues followed in the early 1990s. In 1998, as a solo artist, Mulry issued a CD, This Time, featuring songs co-written with his brother, Steve.

== Death ==
In February 2001, Mulry announced that he had been diagnosed with a terminal brain tumour. Two tribute concerts were organised the following month, with numerous Australian musicians paying homage. Included was a reunion of the Ted Mulry Gang with Steve as lead vocalist. A double-DVD, Gimme Ted – The Ted Mulry Benefit Concerts, was released in 2003. Mulry died of his brain tumour on 1 September 2001 in Sydney, one day away from his 54th birthday. Steve later fronted a rock band, Black Label, which performed in New South Wales and Victoria, including supporting The Angels.

== David Hasselhoff recording ==
In January 2006 actor David Hasselhoff recorded a cover version of "Jump in My Car", whilst in Australia. Hasselhoff's version was released in the UK and went to No. 3 in the UK Singles Chart in October. It also went No. 24 in Ireland.

== Discography ==
=== Studio albums ===
List of albums, with selected chart positions
| Title | Details | Peak chart positions | Certifications |
| Title | Details | AUS | Certifications |
|---|---|---|---|
| Falling in Love Again | Released: 1971; Format: LP; Label: Albert Productions (APLP.001) | — | |
| I Won't Look Back | Released: 1973; Format: LP; Label: Albert Productions (APLP.003) | — | |
| Here We Are (as Ted Mulry Gang) | Released: late 1975; Format: LP, cassette; Label: Albert Productions (APLP.007) | 69 | |
| Struttin' (as Ted Mulry Gang) | Released: May 1976; Format: LP, cassette; Label: Albert Productions (APLP.018) | 8 | AUS: Platinum |
| Steppin' Out (as Ted Mulry Gang) | Released: November 1976; Format: LP, cassette; Label: Albert Productions (APLP.021) | 23 | AUS: Gold |
| The T.M.G. Album (as Ted Mulry Gang) | Released: July 1977; Format: LP, cassette; Label: Mushroom (L 36273) | 24 | |
| Disturbing the Peace (as Ted Mulry Gang) | Released: June 1978; Format: LP, cassette; Label: Mushroom (L 36619) | 72 | |
| Locked In (as Ted Mulry Gang) | Released: 1980; Format: LP, cassette; Label: Mushroom (L 37178) | — | |
| This Time | Released: April 1999; Format: CD; Label: Southland Music (SLM733CD) | — | |

=== Live albums ===
List of live albums, with selected details
| Title | Details |
|---|---|
| TMG Live (as Ted Mulry Gang) | Released: 1979; Format: LP, Cassette; Label: Mushroom (L 37073) |

=== Compilation albums ===
List of compilation albums, with selected details and chart positions
| Title | Details | Peak chart positions |
| Title | Details | AUS |
|---|---|---|
| Greatest Hits (as Ted Mulry, TMG) | Released: 1977; Format: LP, cassette; Label: Albert Productions (APLP.028) | 90 |
| Backtracks Eighteen All Time Favourites (as TMG) | Released: 1982; Format: LP, cassette; Label: Action (JF1) | — |
| Reunion (as TMG) | Released: 1989; Format: LP, CD, cassette; Label: Albert Productions (465268 1) | — |
| The Essential The Essential Ted Mulry & TMG (as Ted Mulry, TMG) | Released: 2013; Format: CD, download; Label: Sony Music Australia (88883713982) | — |
| The Very Best of Ted Mulry Gang: 40th Anniversary | Released: 2016; Format: CD, digital; Label: Sony Music (88985354622) | — |

=== Extended plays ===
List of EPs, with selected details
| Title | Details |
|---|---|
| Julia | Released: 1971; Format: LP; Label: Albert Productions (APEP 1001) |
| Live on Tour (as Ted Mulry Gang) | Released: 1976; Format: LP; Label: Albert Productions (APEP 1002) |

=== Singles ===
List of singles, with selected chart positions
| Year | Title | Peak chart positions | | Album |
| Year | Title | AUS | US | Album |
|---|---|---|---|---|
| 1970 | "Julia" / "So Much in Love" | 24 | — | Julia / Falling in Love Again |
| 1971 | "Falling in Love Again" / "Louisa" | 7 | — | Julia / Falling in Love Again |
| 1971 | "Marcia" / "Love You" | 48 | — | Julia |
| 1971 | "Memories" / "Remember Me" | 25 | — | Falling in Love Again |
| 1972 | "Ain't It Nice" / "If You Should Change My Mind" | — | — | I Won't Look Back |
| 1972 | "I Won't Look Back" / "Just Another Day" | 83 | — | I Won't Look Back |
| 1975 | "Sunday Evenings" / "Here We Are" (as Ted Mulry Gang) | 87 | — | Here We Are |
| 1975 | "Jump in My Car" / "I'm On Fire" (as Ted Mulry Gang) | 1 | — | Here We Are |
| 1976 | "Darktown Strutters' Ball" / "She's for Me" (as Ted Mulry Gang) | 3 | — | Struttin' |
| 1976 | "Crazy" / "Help Me Out" (as Ted Mulry Gang) | 11 | — | Struttin' |
| 1976 | "Stepping Out" / "It's All Over Now" (as Ted Mulry Gang) | 42 | — | Steppin' Out |
| 1976 | "Jamaica Rum" / "Wanted Man" (as Ted Mulry Gang) | 10 | — | Steppin' Out |
| 1977 | "My Little Girl" / "You've Got It" (as Ted Mulry Gang) | 8 | — | The T.M.G. Album |
| 1977 | "Naturally" / "Sha La La Lee" (as Ted Mulry Gang) | 37 | — | The T.M.G. Album |
| 1978 | "Lazy Eyes" / "Set Me Free" (as Ted Mulry Gang) | 33 | 91 | Disturbing the Peace |
| 1978 | "Heart of Stone" / "I Miss You" (as Ted Mulry Gang) | 37 | — | Disturbing the Peace |
| 1978 | "You've Got the Devil in You" / "Disturbing the Peace" (as Ted Mulry Gang) | 69 | — | Disturbing the Peace |
| 1980 | "Save Me" / "How Long" (as Ted Mulry Gang) | — | — | Locked In |
| 1980 | "Can't Take It All" / "Home to You" (as Ted Mulry Gang) | — | — | Locked In |
| 1980 | "Captured" / "I'm Down" (as Ted Mulry Gang) | — | — | Locked In |
| 1981 | "Take a Look Inside" (as Ted Mulry and friends) | — | — | |
| 1990 | "Old Habits" (as Ted Mulry Gang) | — | — | |

== Awards and nominations ==
=== Go-Set Pop Poll ===
The Go-Set Pop Poll was coordinated by the pop music newspaper, Go-Set, which was first published in February 1966. From 1966 to 1972, it conducted an annual poll of its readers to determine the most popular personalities in various cattegories.

| Year | Nominee / work | Award | Result |
|---|---|---|---|
| 1971 | himself | Best Male Vocal | 4th |
