= Clive Shakespeare =

English-born Australian musician

- Shakespeare, live performance at the Capitol Theatre, Sydney on 23 December 1973

Background information
- Born: Clive Richard Shakespeare; 3 June 1947; Southampton, Hampshire, England
- Died: 15 February 2012 (aged 64) Sydney, New South Wales, Australia
- Genres: Pop, rock
- Occupations: Musician, songwriter, producer
- Instrument: Guitar
- Years active: 1968–2012
- Labels: Infinity, Festival

Clive Richard Shakespeare (3 June 1947 – 15 February 2012) was an English-born Australian pop guitarist, songwriter and producer. He was a co-founder of pop rock group Sherbet, which had commercial success in the 1970s including their number-one single, "Summer Love" in 1975. The majority of Sherbet's original songs were co-written by Shakespeare with fellow band member Garth Porter. Other Sherbet singles co-written by Shakespeare include "Cassandra" (peaked at number nine in 1973), "Slipstream" and "Silvery Moon" (both reached number five in 1974). In January 1976 Shakespeare left the band citing dissatisfaction with touring, pressures of writing and concerns over the group's finances. Shakespeare produced albums for other artists including Post by Paul Kelly in 1985. He was diagnosed with prostate cancer in 2002 and died of the disease in 2012, aged 64.

== Biography ==
Clive Richard Shakespeare was born in Southampton, Hampshire, England on 3 June 1947. With his father Cyril (born 1919), mother Eunice (born Gomes, 1918) and a sibling, he travelled to Australia in August 1964 via Castel Felice. The family emigrated under the Government Assisted Passage Scheme to Sydney. He trained as an advertising and marketing assistant, where he moved from office boy to production work on radio ads.

As lead guitarist, he joined various bands including the Road Agents in 1968 in Sydney with Terry Hyland on vocals. He was a founding member of Down Town Roll, which was a Motown covers band, alongside Adrian Cuff (organ), Frank Ma (vocals), Doug Rea (bass guitar), Pam Slater (vocals) and Danny Taylor on drums.

In April 1969 Rea, Shakespeare (lead guitar, slide guitar, backing vocals) and Taylor founded pop, rock band, Sherbet with Dennis Laughlin on vocals (ex-Sebastian Hardie Blues Band, Clapham Junction) and Sam See on organ, guitar, and vocals ). See left in October 1970 to join the Flying Circus and was replaced by New Zealand-born Garth Porter (Samael Lilith, Toby Jugg) who provided Hammond organ and electric piano. Sherbet's initial singles were cover versions released by Infinity Records and distributed by Festival Records.

From 1972 to 1976, Sherbet's main song writing team of Porter and Shakespeare were responsible for co-writing the lion's share of the band's original tracks, which combined British pop and American soul influences. For their debut album, Time Change... A Natural Progression (December 1972), Shakespeare co-wrote five tracks including the top 30 single, "You've Got the Gun". Other Sherbet singles co-written by Shakespeare include "Cassandra" (peaked at number nine in 1973), "Slipstream" and "Silvery Moon" (both reached number five in 1974), and their number-one hit "Summer Love" from 1975. Sherbet followed with more top five singles, "Life" and "Only One You" / "Matter of Time".

In January 1976, Shakespeare left Sherbet citing 'personal reasons'. He later explained "I couldn't even go out the front of my house because there were all these girls just hanging on the fence [...] There was always a deadline for Garth and me – another album, another tour. When it did finally end, I was relieved more than anything because I had had enough. I left the band early in 1976 for reasons I don't want to discuss fully … but let's just say I wasn't happy about where all the money went". The last single he played on was "Child's Play", which was a No. 5 hit in February. Shakespeare was soon replaced by Harvey James (ex-Mississippi, Ariel). In 1977, Shakespeare issued a solo single, "I Realize" / "There's a Way" on Infinity Records.

Shakespeare set up Silverwood Studios and worked in record production, including co-producing Paul Kelly's debut solo album, Post (1985).

Shakespeare rejoined Sherbet for reunion concerts including the Countdown Spectacular tour throughout Australia during September and October 2006. That year also saw the release of two newly recorded tracks on the compilation album, Sherbet – Super Hits, "Red Dress" which was written by Porter, Shakespeare, Daryl Braithwaite, James, Tony Mitchell, and Alan Sandow; and "Hearts Are Insane" written by Porter. In January 2011 Harvey James died of lung cancer – the remaining members except Shakespeare, who was too ill, performed at Gimme that Guitar, a tribute concert for James on 17 February.

== Personal life ==
Shakespeare married Slava Maksymenko in 1969, however their relationship was kept low-profile due to Sherbet's fan-base consisting of young females. The couple had two children before they divorced in 1993. Shakespeare married a fine arts specialist Elizabeth Flynn in 2001, who had two adult children.

=== Death ===
Clive Shakespeare died on 15 February 2012, aged 64, from prostate cancer. It had been diagnosed in 2002, and the prognosis had initially been positive, however, the disease was listed as his cause of death.

== Discography ==
Solo

- "I Realize" / "There's a Way" (1977)

Production

- At the Alpine – Richard & Wendy (1978) – producer
- "Stop All Your Talking" – Tuesday Piranha (1983) – co-producer
- "All You Wanted" – The Apartments (1984) – engineer
- "Possession" – Leonard Samperi / "Give It Up" – David Virgin (June 1984) – engineer
- "Forget" – John Kennedy (September 1984) – audio recorder
- Post – Paul Kelly (May 1985) – co-producer
- "Ruby Baby" – Martin Plaza (1986) – co-producer
- Everything – Let's Go Naked (April 1986) – engineer
- Hide & Seek – Julie Blanchard (February 2012) – engineer
