= Sherbet (band) =

Australian rock band

- Also known as: Highway, The Sherbs
- Origin: Sydney, New South Wales, Australia
- Genres: Rock, soul, pop, new wave
- Years active: 1969–1984, 1998, 2001–2003, 2006–2007, 2011
- Labels: Festival, RSO, MCA, Atco
- Past members: Denis Loughlin; Doug Rea; Sam See; Clive Shakespeare; Danny Taylor; Alan Sandow; Daryl Braithwaite; Bruce Worrall; Garth Porter; Tony Mitchell; Gunther Gorman; Harvey James; Tony Leigh; John Watson

Sherbet (aka Highway or The Sherbs) was an Australian rock band. The 'classic line-up' consisted of Daryl Braithwaite on vocals, Tony Mitchell on bass guitar, Garth Porter on keyboards, Alan Sandow on drums, and Clive Shakespeare on guitar. In 1976 Shakespeare left and was soon replaced by Harvey James. Sherbet's biggest singles were "Summer Love" (1975) and "Howzat" (1976), both reaching number one in Australia. "Howzat" was also a top 5 hit in the United Kingdom. The band was less successful in the United States, where "Howzat" peaked at No. 61. As The Sherbs they also reached No. 61 in 1981 with "I Have the Skill". The group disbanded in 1984. Re-unions have occurred since 1998.

According to rock music historian, Ian McFarlane, "alongside Skyhooks, Sherbet was the most successful Australian pop band of the 1970s. With a run of 20 consecutive hit singles to its credit, and 17 albums that yielded ten platinum and 40 gold disc awards, Sherbet was the first domestic act to sell a million dollars' worth of records in Australia". In 1990 Sherbet were inducted into the ARIA Hall of Fame alongside classical composer and pianist, Percy Grainger. On 15 January 2011 Harvey James died of lung cancer. On 15 February 2012 Clive Shakespeare died of prostate cancer. On 23 January 2019 founding vocalist Denis Loughlin died after being diagnosed with cancer.

== History ==
From 1970 until 1984 Sherbet scored 20 hit singles in Australia (including two number ones) and released ten platinum status albums. The single "Howzat" which was a number-one hit in 1976, also reached number four on the UK Singles Chart. They were the first Australian band to reach $1 million in record sales in Australia, and they pioneered the concept of massive regional tours. In December 1976, the book Sherbet on Tour, by Christie Eliezer, sold 30,000 copies in its first week.

=== Formation and early years (1969–1972) ===
Sherbet was formed in Sydney in April 1969, with Glasgow-born Denis Loughlin (ex-Sebastian Hardie Blues Band, Clapham Junction) on vocals, Doug Rea (ex Downtown Roll Band) on bass guitar, Sammy See (ex Clapham Junction) on organ, guitar and vocals, Clive Shakespeare (ex-Downtown Roll Band) on lead guitar and vocals, and Danny Taylor (ex Downtown Roll Band) on drums. Initially they were a soul band, playing Motown covers and rock-based material. Alan Sandow (ex-Daisy Roots) had replaced Taylor on drums by July. Sherbet signed to the Infinity Records label, a subsidiary of Festival Records. In March 1970, the band's debut single was issued, a cover version of Badfinger's "Crimson Ships", from that band's January 1970 album Magic Christian Music.

During 1970, the band played a residency at Jonathon's Disco, playing seven hours a night, four days a week for eight months. They were spotted by their future manager, Roger Davies. By March Daryl Braithwaite (Bright Lights, House of Bricks, Samael Lilith) had joined, initially sharing lead vocals with Loughlin who left the band a few months later. Braithwaite's former bandmate Bruce Worrall (Bright Lights, House of Bricks, Samael Lilith) took over from Rea on bass guitar. By year's end the group undertook their first national tour. See had left in October to join The Flying Circus and was replaced by New Zealand-born Garth Porter (Samael Lilith, Toby Jugg) who provided Hammond organ and electric piano.

In 1971, Sherbet entered Australia's prestigious national rock band contest, Hoadley's Battle of the Sounds. They won the New South Wales final but lost the national final to Adelaide-based band Fraternity (led by Bon Scott later in AC/DC). They entered again in 1972 and won the national final. Previous winners include The Twilights (1966) and The Groove (1968), both of which enjoyed major commercial success.

Sherbet's first chart hits on the Go-Set National Top 40 were covers of Blue Mink's "Can You Feel It Baby?" (September 1971), Delaney and Bonnie's "Free the People" (February 1972) and Ted Mulry's "You're All Woman" (September 1972). Most of their early recordings were produced by Festival's in-house producer Richard Batchens, who later produced albums and singles for another Infinity label mate, Richard Clapton. The band increased its profile with prestigious support slots on major tours by visiting international acts including Gary Glitter and The Jackson 5.

=== Rise to stardom (1972–1975) ===
This band logo first appeared on the 1973 album cover, On with the Show. The logo evolved with the addition of stylised encapsulating horizontal lines from their name on Time Change... A Natural Progression in 1972. More than 30 years later, the logo appeared on the 2006 compilation album Super Hits

In January 1972, Sherbet's 'classic line-up' was in place when Tony Mitchell replaced Worrall on bass guitar: the band now consisted of lead vocalist Braithwaite, keyboardist Porter, drummer Sandow, bassist Mitchell and guitarist Shakespeare. The band had evolved from a soul-based covers band into a teen-oriented pop rock outfit that relied mostly on original material. Nevertheless, they released occasional covers throughout the 1970s, including Leiber and Stoller's "Hound Dog", The Beatles' "Nowhere Man" and Free's "Wishing Well". From 1972 to 1976, Sherbet's chief songwriting team of Porter and Shakespeare were responsible for co-writing the lion's share of the band's material, which combined British pop and American soul influences.

Sherbet issued their debut album, Time Change... A Natural Progression, in December 1972 on Infinity Records. Also that month the band were voted 'Most Popular Australian Group' by readers of Go-Set in their annual pop poll. The album's accompanying single "You've Got the Gun", written by Shakespeare, Porter and Braithwaite, was Sherbet's first self-penned A-side, and peaked at No. 29 in January 1973.

In December 1973, the band hit the Go-Set Top 10 for the first time with the Porter and Shakespeare original, "Cassandra". It was issued in October ahead of their second album, On with the Show released in November, which peaked at No. 6 on the Go-Set Top 20 Australian Albums Chart in February 1974. It was followed by "Slipstream" which reached No. 7 on Go-Set's National Top 40 in August. A string of hits followed on the Australian Kent Music Report Singles Chart (replacing Go-Set charts after August), with Sherbet releasing original Top 10 hits such as "Silvery Moon" (1974) and their first number-one hit "Summer Love" (1975). A total of 11 Sherbet songs reached the Australian top 10.

The band were the darlings of Australia's teenyboppers: for six years in a row they were voted 'Most Popular Australian Group' by readers of TV Week for their King of Pop Awards from 1973 to 1978. From 1975 they made more appearances on national TV pop show Countdown than any other band in the programme's history. Band members – especially Braithwaite – often appeared as co-hosts. According to contemporary musician, Dave Warner, "[t]hey had a clean-cut boys-next door image; a big contrast to the bad boy, weirdo, heavy-riff persona favoured by their peers". Sherbet's albums also charted on the Australian Kent Music Report Albums Chart with October 1974's Slipstream peaking at No. 5, 1975's Life... Is for Living reached No. 6, and their first compilation album, Greatest Hits 1970-75, from 1975 became their first number-one album.

From 1974, Braithwaite maintained a parallel solo career with Sherbet members often playing on his solo singles. Braithwaite was voted 'King of Pop' for three successive years, 1975 to 1977. Beginning in 1975, Sherbet's records were produced by Richard Lush who had started as a trainee engineer at EMI's Abbey Road Studios, where he helped engineer some of The Beatles' recordings including Sgt. Pepper's Lonely Hearts Club Band. Porter began to take an occasional lead vocal on Sherbet singles, including "Hollywood Dreaming" and "A Matter of Time". Throughout this era, Sherbet toured Australia regularly and with remarkable thoroughness; they were one of the few bands to consistently commit to playing full-scale concerts in regional areas of the country.

The idea for the satin bomber jackets came from Garth Porter. He got an American baseball jacket in an Op Shop. When they were having their clothes designed (by Richard Tyler), Garth said: "If you're going to make me anything just make me something like this," showing him the satin bomber jacket. Before they knew what was happening, the trend took hold and everybody in the band was having them made up to their own requirements. Their management went so far as using it as a marketing tool for the band.

=== International success (1976–1979) ===
In January 1976, Shakespeare left Sherbet citing 'personal reasons'. He later explained "I couldn't even go out the front of my house because there were all these girls just hanging on the fence [...] There was always a deadline for Garth and me - another album, another tour. When it did finally end, I was relieved more than anything because I had had enough. I left the band early in 1976 for reasons I don't want to discuss fully … but let's just say I wasn't happy about where all the money went". The last single he played on was "Child's Play", which was a No. 5 hit in February. Shakespeare was briefly replaced by journeyman guitarist Gunther Gorman (ex-Home) but within weeks a more permanent replacement, Harvey James (ex-Mississippi, Ariel) joined. Meanwhile, Mitchell had stepped up to join Porter as Sherbet's new main songwriting team. The pair were responsible for penning "Howzat" (1976), the band's only international hit, which was inspired by the sport of cricket. The song's success led to an extensive international tour in 1976-77. "Howzat" went to number one in Australia and in New Zealand, while it was a Top 10 hit in several European countries – including number four on the UK Singles Chart, number six in The Netherlands, and number eight in Norway. It reached the top 10 in South Africa, South-East Asia, and Israel. The single had less chart success in the United States where it reached No. 61 on the Billboard Hot 100. The album of the same name also made No. 1 in Australia, No. 12 in New Zealand, but failed to chart in the US.

In 1976, the release of the double A-sided single "Rock Me Gently/You've Got the Gun" saw the record company place full page ads in Billboard. The promotion went on to state the band had a sound "as sophisticated pop/rock along the lines of Chicago or Three Dog Night". It goes on to say the single has "the unique distinction of having received heavy airplay before it was shipped".

Hoping to achieve further international success, from 1977, Sherbet spent several years trying to make an impact in the US. Their 1977 album Photoplay was retitled Magazine for US release, and featured an elaborate gate-fold packaging. Though Photoplay and its lead single, "Magazine Madonna", were successful in Australia – both reached No. 3 on their respective charts – the retitled Magazine LP failed to chart in the US as did the associated single. In the same year Sherbet provided the soundtrack for the buddy comedy, High Rolling. With US success proving elusive, the band's label RSO Records felt that the lightweight name Sherbet may have hurt their chances. Accordingly, their US-recorded self-titled album was issued in the US under a new group name, Highway, and re-titled as Highway 1 – despite the change it also flopped.

By this time the band's career in Australia had begun to decline. Though the Sherbet album peaked at No. 3, "Another Night on the Road" (1978) was Sherbet's final top 10 Australian hit. The band's next single "Beg, Steal or Borrow" missed the chart completely, and January 1979's "Angela" – from the soundtrack to the film Snapshot – reached the top 100 - but only just.

The group's Australian success was on the wane, and either as Sherbet or as Highway, they were unable to come up with a follow-up international hit to "Howzat". Frustrated by the career downturn, after issuing a final single in Australia as Highway – "Heart Get Ready" – which flopped at No. 89, the band broke up in mid-1979. Throughout the 1970s, the group was managed by Roger Davies. The group briefly reunited for the Concert of the Decade held on 4 November 1979 at the Sydney Opera House and sponsored by radio station 2SM – an edited hour of concert footage was broadcast by the Nine Network under the same name and a double-LP was issued on Mushroom Records later that month. During the concert, Mitchell also supplied bass guitar for Neale Johns' set (see Blackfeather) and then Stevie Wright's rendition of his solo hit "Evie".

=== The Sherbs era (1980–1984) ===
The break-up did not last long. In 1980, Sherbet reconvened as The Sherbs with exactly the same personnel they had before the split: Braithwaite, Harvey, Mitchell, Porter and Sandow. The new renamed iteration of the group also changed their approach, as they now featured a somewhat modified progressive new wave sound. This version of the band had some minor success in America, but their almost complete lack of chart action in Australia was in stark contrast to their 1970s heyday.

The Sherbs' first album The Skill was released in October 1980 and reached the top half of the Billboard 200. It was the first album by the group – under any of their names – to chart in the US. An accompanying single, "I Have the Skill", became the band's second US pop chart hit at No. 61. The Sherbs also appeared on the inaugural AOR-oriented Rock Tracks chart issued by Billboard in March 1981: "I Have the Skill" debuted at No. 45. The track peaked at No. 14, the band's highest position on any US chart, and The Sherbs also received airplay on US album-oriented rock (AOR) radio stations with "No Turning Back". However, none of the singles from The Skill reached the Australian Kent Music Report top 100, a huge comedown for a band that had been major charting artists in Australia only two years earlier.

The Sherbs's second album, Defying Gravity, followed in 1981, but failed to produce a single that charted in the either the US or Australian top 100. The band did, however, chart on Billboard's Rock Tracks Chart with the album cut "We Ride Tonight" peaking at No. 26 in 1982. The track's mild AOR success was not enough to ignite album sales in the US, though, and Defying Gravity only reached No. 202 on the album charts. A mini-album, Shaping Up, appeared in 1982. It was critically well received and spawned two minor hits in Australia, but the US issue missed the chart completely. The Sherbs were now in a position where the US listening public were largely indifferent to their releases, and – despite their newer, more contemporary sound – the Australian audience had seemingly written them off as a relic of the 1970s. Porter has said that he found this especially frustrating, as he felt The Sherbs were actually writing and performing better material during this era than in their 1970s heyday.

James left The Sherbs at the end of 1982 to be replaced by Tony Leigh (Harry Young and Sabbath, Gillian Eastoe Band) on guitar. In late 1983, the group announced their decision to disband in 1984, they reverted to Sherbet and undertook a successful farewell tour of Australia and a final single, "Tonight Will Last Forever". Shakespeare returned to co-write and appear on the final single. Both Shakespeare and James rejoined Sherbet on the final tour. Following the group's break-up, Braithwaite continued his solo career in Australia, and Porter and Shakespeare each became successful record producers. In 1990 Sherbet were inducted into the ARIA Hall of Fame alongside classical composer and pianist, Percy Grainger.

=== Reunions (1998–2011) ===
Sherbet have reunited on occasion over subsequent years. Their first reunion was an ABC-TV special on New Year's Eve 1998. They performed "Howzat" and "Summer Love" without Sandow – John Watson (ex-Kevin Borich Band, Australian Crawl) filled in on drums. On 10 March 2001 with Sandow on board, the band reunited for Gimme Ted – a benefit concert for Ted Mulry, with two songs recorded for the associated 2×DVD tribute album released in May 2003. In June 2003 Sherbet performed at another benefit show for Wane Jarvis (a former roadie).

At the May 2006 Logie Awards Sherbet reunited as a six-piece: Braithwaite, James, Mitchell, Porter, Sandow and Shakespeare, where they performed "Howzat". The band played three shows in late August 2006 billed as Daryl Braithwaite and Highway. They followed by joining the Countdown Spectacular tour throughout Australia during September and October. 2006 also saw the release of two newly recorded tracks on the compilation album, Sherbet – Super Hits, "Red Dress" (Porter, Shakespeare, Braithwaite, Mitchell, James, Sandow) and "Hearts Are Insane" (Porter), both produced by Ted Howard.

2007 saw the release of a live compilation on CD and DVD entitled Live – And the Crowd Went Wild encompassing material recorded in the 1970s at shows in Sydney, Melbourne and the UK. Sherbet performed on the Countdown Spectacular 2 in August and September. On 15 January 2011 Harvey James died of lung cancer – the remaining members except Shakespeare, who was too ill, performed at Gimme that Guitar, a tribute concert for James on 17 February. This was the last performance by Sherbet to date.

On 15 February 2012 Clive Shakespeare died of prostate cancer. Founding vocalist Denis Loughlin (28 July 1949 – 23 January 2019) died after contracting cancer.

== Band members ==
Arranged chronologically:

- Denis Loughlin – lead vocals (1969–1970, died 2019)
- Doug Rea – bass (1969)
- Sam See – keyboards, organ, guitar, backing vocals (1969–1970)
- Clive Shakespeare – guitar, backing vocals (1969–1976, 1984, 1998, 2001, 2003, 2006, 2007, died 2012)
- Danny Taylor – drums (1969)
- Alan Sandow – drums, percussion, bongos, chimes, occasional backing vocals (1969–1984, 2001, 2003, 2006, 2007, 2011)
- Daryl Braithwaite – lead vocals, tambourine, tabla (1970–1984, 1998, 2001, 2003, 2006, 2007, 2011)
- Bruce Worrall – bass (1970–1972)
- Garth Porter – keyboards, clavinet, piano, backing and occasional lead vocals, Hammond organ, electric piano, synthesiser, saxophones (1970–1984, 1998, 2001, 2003, 2006, 2007, 2011)
- Tony Mitchell – bass, backing and occasional lead vocals, ukulele (1972–1984, 1998, 2001, 2003, 2006, 2007, 2011)
- Gunther Gorman – guitar (1976)
- Harvey James – guitar, backing vocals, slide guitar (1976–1982, 1984, 1998, 2001, 2003, 2006, 2007, died 2011)
- Tony Leigh – guitar (1982–1984)
- John Watson – drums (1998)
- Gabe James – guitar (2011)
- Josh James – guitar (2011)
- Johnny Sans – guitar (2011)

== Discography ==
- Time Change... A Natural Progression (1972)
- On with the Show (1973)
- Slipstream (1974)
- Life... Is for Living (1975)
- Howzat! (1976)
- Photoplay (1977)
- Sherbet (released internationally as Highway 1 by Highway, 1978)
- The Skill (as the Sherbs, 1980)
- Defying Gravity (as the Sherbs, 1981)
- Shaping Up (mini-LP as the Sherbs, 1982)

== Awards and nominations ==
=== ARIA Music Awards ===
The ARIA Music Awards is an annual awards ceremony that recognises excellence, innovation, and achievement across all genres of Australian music. They commenced in 1987. Sherbet were inducted into the Hall of Fame in 1990.

Year	Nominee / work	Award	Result
1990	Sherbet	ARIA Hall of Fame	inductee

=== Go-Set Pop Poll ===
The Go-Set Pop Poll was coordinated by teen-oriented pop music newspaper, Go-Set and was established in February 1966 and conducted an annual poll during 1966 to 1972 of its readers to determine the most popular personalities.

Year	Nominee / work	Award	Result
1972	themselves	Best Australian Group	1st
1972	"You're All Woman"	Best Australian Single	2nd

=== King of Pop Awards ===
The King of Pop Awards were voted by the readers of TV Week. The King of Pop award started in 1967 and ran through to 1978.

- NB: wins only

Year	Nominee / work	Award	Result
1973	themselves	Most Popular Australian Group	Won
1974	themselves	Most Popular Australian Group	Won
1975	Daryl Braithwaite (Sherbet)	King of Pop	Won
1975	themselves	Most Popular Australian Group	Won
1975	"Summer Love"	Most Popular Australian single	Won
1976	Daryl Braithwaite (Sherbet)	King of Pop	Won
1976	themselves	Most Popular Australian Group	Won
1976	Howzat	Most Popular Australian album	Won
1976	"Howzat"	Most Popular Australian single	Won
1977	Daryl Braithwaite (Sherbet)	King of Pop	Won
1977	themselves	Most Popular Australian Group	Won
1977	Photoplay	Most Popular Australian album	Won
1977	"Magazine Madonna"	Most Popular Australian single	Won
1978	themselves	Most Popular Australian Group	Won

=== TV Week / Countdown Awards ===
Countdown was an Australian pop music TV series on national broadcaster ABC-TV from 1974–1987, it presented music awards from 1979–1987, initially in conjunction with magazine TV Week. The TV Week / Countdown Awards were a combination of popular-voted and peer-voted awards.

Year	Nominee / work	Award	Result
1979	themselves	Most Popular Group	Nominated
