= Tony Mitchell (musician) =

- Born: Sydney, New South Wales, Australia
- Genres: Rock, pop
- Occupations: Musician, songwriter
- Instruments: Bass, vocals
- Years active: 1960s–present
- Formerly of: Sherbet

Tony Mitchell is an Australian songwriter and bass guitarist who rose to fame in the 1970s with rock band Sherbet. Mitchell co-wrote some of Sherbet's biggest hits, including "Howzat" and "Magazine Madonna".

== Early life ==
Mitchell was born in Sydney.

His first band was called Wheelbarrow. After recording and releasing one single for the band, he left in order to play with Harry Young And Sabbath, which he was a part of from 1969 to c. 1973.

== Sherbet ==
Mitchell joined Sherbet in 1972. During his time in the band in the 1970s, Sherbet would go on to have such hits as "Summer Love" (1975) and "Howzat" (1976), both of which reached number one in Australia. Mitchell co-wrote (with Garth Porter) some of Sherbet's biggest hits, including "Howzat" and "Magazine Madonna".

=== "Howzat" ===
In 1976, someone suggested to Tony Mitchell and keyboardist Garth Porter that "Howzat" might make a good title for a song because some of the members of Sherbet loved cricket. Despite Mitchell not being a good cricketer, he sat down with Porter at his Watsons Bay home to work on the idea. Mitchell soon came up with the "doo-doo, doo-doo" bass riff, after which the first thing that came into Porter's mind was the phrase "I caught you out."

The song became Sherbet's biggest hit, rising to #1 on the Australian charts and #4 in the United Kingdom.

== Later career ==
Mitchell would play in a few more bands during the late 1970s and 1980s, including Autumn, John Paul Young and The All Stars, and The Foster Brothers. Mitchell continues to perform live on stage.
