= Garth Porter =

- Born: Garth Ivan Richard Porter; 24 September 1948 (age 78); Hamilton, New Zealand
- Origin: Sydney, New South Wales, Australia
- Genres: Pop, country
- Occupations: Musician, producer
- Instruments: Keyboards, vocals, piano (string, electric), organ (Hammond), clavinet, mellotron, synthesizers, saxophone
- Years active: 1969–present
- Label: Razzle/Festival
- Formerly of: Sherbet

Garth Ivan Richard Porter AM (born 24 September 1948) is a New Zealand-born Australian multi-instrumental musician, songwriter and record producer. He was a member, on keyboards and backing vocals, of the pop group, Sherbet (1970–84), and co-wrote both of their number-one singles, "Summer Love" (March 1975) and "Howzat" (May 1976). Porter is a co-writer and producer for country music singer Lee Kernaghan.

== Early life ==
Garth Ivan Richard Porter was born on 24 September 1948 in Hamilton. His parents were farmers in the nearby rural area. He recalled that while growing up "I learnt piano for about six months so I had a rough idea of musical notation." The future songwriter spent two nights a week at his grandparents home in Hamilton, "I'd walk there from work and from their place, I would walk to night school and I vividly remember I used to really look forward to my walks. As I was walking, the pace of my footsteps would be the rhythm of a song and I was just making up words and melodies all the time I was walking to my grandparents and then to night school."

== Early career ==
In 1969 Porter was a member of Swellfoot's Assembly while a student at University of Waikato, which included Marion Arts on lead vocals and Paul Baxter on bass guitar. Later that year he was in Sydney and joined Samael Lilith alongside Daryl Braithwaite on lead vocals, Ray Ferguson on guitar and backing vocals, Mick Parker on bass guitar and flute (replaced by Bruce Worrall on bass guitar), and Greg Wilder on drums. He left that group in the next year and was briefly a member of Toby Jugg, which issued a cover version of Amen Corner's "(If Paradise Is) Half as Nice" as a single in 1970.

== Sherbet ==
In October 1970 Porter, on Hammond organ, electric piano, backing vocals and occasional lead vocals, joined the Sydney-based pop group, Sherbet. The group included his former bandmates Braithwaite and Worrall from Samael Lilith, as well as Alan Sandow on drums and Clive Shakespeare on lead guitar and co-lead vocals. Porter's first song writing effort for Sherbet, "One Man Team", was performed in late 1972 and early the next year but "We never recorded it... That was a pop/rock sort of thing I guess." The first Porter-written track recorded by Sherbet, "Back Home", was issued as the B-side of "You're All Woman" (August 1972).

Porter and Shakespeare co-wrote most of the group's early hits including, "Cassandra" (December 1973), which peaked at No. 5 on the Go-Set National Top 40. Australian musicologist, Ian McFarlane, described it as "the first real indication of the Porter/Shakespeare-penned pop masterpieces that were to follow" and it "made extensive use of Porter's newly acquired Mellotron, which gave Sherbet a distinctive edge and sound over other Australian pop groups of the day." Porter and Shakespeare's co-written top 10 hits for Sherbet include "Slipstream" (June 1974), "Silvery Moon" (August) and, the group's first number-one hit, "Summer Love" (March 1975). Julie Kusko of The Australian Women's Weekly described Porter, in March 1975, as "Tall, and good-looking, he worked in an accountant's office before giving way to music."

Tony Catterall of The Canberra Times reviewed their first live album, ... In Concert in April 1975, he praised Braithwaite's voice as their "one major strength" but found their major weaknesses were "an almost total lack of writing ability that, coupled with the band's extremely erratic musicianship, makes it hard to understand the frantic screams of adulation." He felt that Porter provides "some interesting mellotron and organ work... although his piano playing (on a Steinway Concert Grand!) is dreadfully pedestrian."

Further Porter and Shakespeare co-written top 10 hits for Sherbet followed: "Life" (August 1975), "Only One You" (November) and "Child's Play (February 1976). While a member of Sherbet, Porter also worked as a session musician and producer. In 1974 he appeared on band mate, Braithwaite's solo single, a cover version of Cilla Black's recording of "You're My World". He also worked on The Mixtures album, The Mixtures, in that year. In 1975 Sherbet toured Australia to promote their fourth studio album, Life... Is for Living, their support act were Dalvanius and the Fascinations, a New Zealand-formed soul music band. Porter produced the group's single, "Canberra We're Watching You", which was a reworking of the Staple Singers' track "Washington We're Watching".

After Shakespeare left Sherbet in January 1976, Porter co-wrote mostly with Tony Mitchell (Worrall's replacement on bass guitar) including the group's second number-one hit, "Howzat" (May 1976). In June Catterall approved of Shakespeare's replacement, Harvey James, on lead guitar as "It frees Garth Porter on organ from having to carry the leads, a job which he could handle well enough for a pop band but not for rock, and allows him to concentrate more on filling in the inevitable holes in the sound." The associated album of the same title followed in July and also reached number one on the related Kent Music Report Albums Chart. It was co-produced by Richard Lush with Sherbet members, including Porter. From September Sherbet toured the United Kingdom where "Howzat" peaked at No. 4 on the UK Singles Chart in October. Porter told The Australian Women's Weekly's Camilla Beach in November that "I've had two good feelings about it... One was a letter from my mother – she is so proud. And I hope Australia is proud of us too. But we haven't made it yet. That takes five years."

In 1977 Porter co-produced Rockwell T. James' album, Shot of Rhythm and Blues, he also supplied instrumental backing. Other top 10 singles co-written by Porter with various Sherbet members are "Rock Me Gently" (October 1976), "Magazine Madonna" (June 1977) and "Another Night on the Road" (August 1978). Porter sang lead vocals on "Matter of Time" (November 1975) and "Hollywood Dreaming" (June 1976) while with Sherbet. From the late 1980s to 1984 the group attempted to enter the United States market, which included re-branding themselves as Highway and then as the Sherbs before disbanding.

== Later career ==
Porter initially had difficulty after the group's disbandment "I had a vague idea of a solo career, but not really, it was kind of there as an option but nothing that I really pursued... I found it really hard going as a songwriter, just out on your own in the middle of kind of nowhere. And especially the credentials of having been in Sherbet at that time were kind of, it was like having the plague really."

He helped launch Lee Kernaghan and co-wrote some of the songs for the live Musical theatre production The Man from Snowy River: Arena Spectacular (which toured Australian capital cities — twice). The Original Cast Album of the show won the ARIA award for Best Cast / Show Album).

== Personal life ==
In March 1975 Julie Kusko of The Australian Women's Weekly described his hobbies as furniture collecting, fishing and camping. On 7 August 1978 Porter "married his long-time girlfriend" Mary Byrnes in Sydney.

Porter is a producer, arranger, composer, mixer

Porter plays keyboards, mellotron, organ (Hammond, Wurlitzer), clavinet, piano (string, electric, grand), synthesiser, vocals (backing, lead), percussion, harpsichord and saxophone.

== Awards ==
=== ARIA Music Awards ===
The ARIA Music Awards is an annual awards ceremony that recognises excellence, innovation, and achievement across all genres of Australian music.

Year	Nominee / work	Award	Result
2015	Garth Porter for Spirit of the Anzacs by Lee Kernaghan	ARIA Award for Producer of the Year	Nominated

=== Australian Songwriters Hall of Fame ===
The Australian Songwriters Hall of Fame was established in 2004 to honour the lifetime achievements of some of Australia's greatest songwriters.

Year	Nominee / work	Award	Result
2013	himself	Australian Songwriters Hall of Fame	inducted

=== Country Music Awards of Australia ===
The Country Music Awards of Australia (CMAA) (also known as the Golden Guitar Awards) is an annual awards night held in January during the Tamworth Country Music Festival, celebrating recording excellence in the Australian country music industry. They have been held annually since 1973.

Year	Nominee / work	Award	Result (wins only)
1993	himself	Producer of the Year	Won
1993	"Boys from the Bush" (with Lee Kernaghan)	APRA Song of the Year	Won
1994	himself	Producer of the Year	Won
1994	"Three Chain Road" (with Lee Kernaghan)	APRA Song of the Year	Won
1995	himself	Producer of the Year	Won
1996	himself	Producer of the Year	Won
1997	himself	Producer of the Year	Won
1998	himself	Producer of the Year	Won
1999	"That Old Caravan" (written by Colin Buchanan & Garth Porter, recorded by Colin Buchanan)	Bush Ballad of the Year	Won
2000	"They Don't Make 'Em Like That Anymore" (written by Troy Cassar-Daley, Garth Porter & Colin Buchanan)	APRA Song of the Year	Won
2004	"Raining On the Plains" (written by Sara Storer, Garth Porter & Doug Storer)	APRA Song of the Year	Won
2007	"Close As a Whisper (The Gift)" (written by Lee Kernaghan, Garth Porter & Colin Buchanan, recorded by Lee Kernaghan)	Heritage Song of the Year	Won

=== Tamworth Songwriters Awards ===
The Tamworth Songwriters Association (TSA) is an annual songwriting contest for original country songs, awarded in January at the Tamworth Country Music Festival. They commenced in 1986. Garth Porter has won two awards in that time.

Year	Nominee / work	Award	Result (wins only)
1993	"Boys from the Bush" by Lee Kernaghan and Garth Porter	Contemporary Country Song of the Year	Won
1993	"Boys from the Bush" by Lee Kernaghan and Garth Porter	Country Song of the Year	Won
