= 1978 in music =

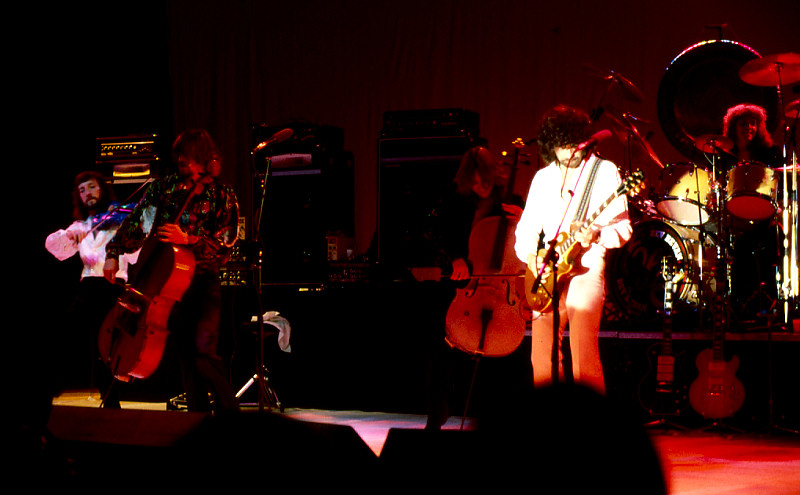
Electric Light Orchestra in 1978

This is a list of notable events in music that took place in the year 1978.

== Specific locations ==
- 1978 in British music
- 1978 in Japanese music
- 1978 in Norwegian music
- 1978 in Scandinavian music

== Specific genres ==
- 1978 in country music
- 1978 in heavy metal music
- 1978 in jazz
- 1978 in progressive rock

== Events ==
=== January–April ===
- January 14 – The Sex Pistols play their final show (until a 1996 reunion) at San Francisco's Winterland Ballroom.
- January 16 – Elton John appears on this week's People (magazine) without his trademark glasses. John will still wear glasses occasionally for the next ten years until wearing them permanently again.
- January 17 – Simple Minds make their first live performance at Glasgow's Satellite City.
- January 21 – As Saturday Night Fever becomes a cultural phenomenon, the soundtrack hits #1 on the Billboard Charts, where it will stay until July.
- January 23 – Terry Kath, guitarist and founding member of rock band Chicago, dies from an accidental gunshot wound to the head from a gun he thought was unloaded, in Woodland Hills, Los Angeles; he is 32 years old.
- January 25
  - Electric Light Orchestra kick off their "Out of the Blue" world tour in Honolulu, Hawaii.
  - Bob Dylan makes his directorial debut in the surrealist film Renaldo and Clara, shot during his Rolling Thunder Revue tour.
- January 26 – Workers at EMI's record processing plant in England refuse to press copies of The Buzzcocks's second single "What Do I Get?" because of its flipside, "Oh Shit!". The single is eventually pressed and goes on to become the band's first hit.
- January 28 – By request, Ted Nugent autographs his name into a fan's arm with a bowie knife in Philadelphia.
- February 4 – Elton John appears as the guest star on The Muppet Show.
- February 10 – Van Halen debuts with a self-titled album; Eddie Van Halen introduces a powerful new sound and technique to world, while David Lee Roth is ushered in as the front man.
- February 23 – The 20th Annual Grammy Awards are presented in Los Angeles, hosted by John Denver. Fleetwood Mac's Rumours wins Album of the Year, the Eagles' "Hotel California" wins Record of the Year and, in a rare tie, Barbra Streisand's "Evergreen (Love Theme from A Star Is Born)" and Debby Boone's "You Light Up My Life" both collectively win Song of the Year. Boone also wins Best New Artist.
- March 11 – Kate Bush tops the UK Singles Chart with "Wuthering Heights", becoming the first-ever female artist to top the chart with a self-penned song.
- March 18 – California Jam II is held at the Ontario Motor Speedway in California. Over 300,000 fans come to see Ted Nugent, Aerosmith, Santana, Dave Mason, Foreigner, Heart and more.
- April 22
  - In the Eurovision Song Contest in Paris, France, victory goes to Israel's entry "A-Ba-Ni-Bi", performed by Izhar Cohen & The Alphabeta.
  - The "One Love Peace Concert" is held in Kingston, Jamaica, headlined by Bob Marley, making his first concert appearance since December 1976.
  - Steve Martin performs the original "King Tut" on Saturday Night Live; also this night, The Blues Brothers make their first appearance on the show.

=== May–July ===
- May 6 – The Knack is formed (first album released in 1979).
- May 13 – Barry Gibb becomes the only songwriter in history to have written 4 consecutive #1 singles on Billboard's Hot 100 Chart.
- May 18 – The Buddy Holly Story, starring Gary Busey, is released. It would win the Academy Award for Best Music, Original Song Score and Its Adaptation or Best Adaptation Score, and earn a nomination for Best Actor in a Leading Role (Busey) and Best Sound.
- May 23 – Grieg Hall (Grieghallen) inaugurated in Bergen, Norway as a concert venue.
- May 25 – In a performance used for The Kids Are Alright, The Who play their last show with Keith Moon.
- June 7 – Prince's debut single, "Soft and Wet", is released by Warner Bros. Records.
- June 10 – The Rolling Stones begin their 25-date US summer tour in Lakeland, Florida.
- June 13 – The Cramps play a free concert for patients at the Napa State Mental Hospital.
- June 16 – The film adaptation of the musical Grease, opens in theaters and is a box office hit.
- June 20 – Grace Slick splits with Jefferson Starship the day after a disastrous concert in Hamburg, Germany, in which a heavily intoxicated Slick verbally abused the crowd and groped various fans and bandmates.
- June 29 – Peter Frampton is nearly killed in a car accident in The Bahamas, suffering multiple broken bones, a concussion, and muscle damage.
- July 1 – The first Texxas Jam is held over the July 4 long weekend at the Cotton Bowl in Dallas. The first day features Ted Nugent, Aerosmith, Frank Marino and Mahogany Rush, Heart, Journey, Head East, Atlanta Rhythm Section, Eddie Money, Van Halen and Walter Egan. Sunday consists of Willie Nelson headlining his sixth annual Fourth of July picnic.
- July 15 – The Picnic at Blackbushe Aerodrome, Camberley, Surrey, England, a concert featuring Bob Dylan, Eric Clapton and Joan Armatrading, attracts some 200,000 people.
- July 19 – Dead Kennedys play their first concert, at the Mabuhay Gardens in San Francisco, California.
- July 21 – Sgt. Pepper's Lonely Hearts Club Band, a much-hyped musical film starring Peter Frampton and the Bee Gees performing the music of The Beatles, opens in theaters. The film is savaged by critics and proves a box office disappointment.
- July 29 – Glenn Goins, one of the lead vocalists for the band Parliament-Funkadelic dies of Hodgkin's lymphoma at age of 24.
- July 30 – Thin Lizzy officially announces that Gary Moore has replaced Brian Robertson on guitar.

=== August–December ===
- August 26 – 80,000 concertgoers attend Mosport Speedway in Ontario for the "Canada Jam Festival", featuring sets by the Doobie Brothers, Commodores, Kansas, Village People, Dave Mason, the Atlanta Rhythm Section and Triumph.
- August 26 – 67,000 Funk fans assembled at Soldier Field in Chicago, Illinois to attend the first annual Funk Festival, billed as "One Nation Under A Groove", featuring A Taste of Honey, Parlet, Con Funk Shun, the Bar-Kays, and Parliament-Funkadelic.
- September 7 – The Who drummer Keith Moon dies in a central London flat after a prescription drug overdose at the age of 32.
- September 14–16 – The Grateful Dead perform three shows in Giza, Egypt, very close to the Sphinx and Great Pyramid.
- October 12 – Nancy Spungen, the American girlfriend of Sex Pistols bassist Sid Vicious, is found dead in a New York hotel room of a stab wound. Sid is arrested and charged with her murder.
- October 21 – Founder members John Taylor and Nick Rhodes name their newly formed band Duran Duran after the character "Dr. Durand Durand" from the sci-fi film Barbarella the day after the film had been broadcast on BBC 1.
- October 24 – Rolling Stones guitarist Keith Richards pleads guilty to a reduced charge of possessing heroin in Toronto in 1977. The more serious charge of drug trafficking is dropped and Richards is given a one-year suspended sentence as well as ordered to play a charity concert for the blind.
- October 29 – Michael Schenker plays his final show with UFO in Stanford, California before leaving the group to rejoin Scorpions.
- November – Iron Maiden hires lead singer Paul Di'Anno.
- November 21 – French pop star Dalida performs a concert at New York's Carnegie Hall.
- November 25
  - A now sober Alice Cooper releases the album From the Inside, which tells of his stay in rehab for alcoholism.
  - Aerosmith cuts a concert short after Steven Tyler suffers cuts to his face from a bottle that shatters upon hitting a stage monitor.
  - Donna Summer becomes the first female artist of the modern rock era to have the number one single (Mac Arthur Park) and album (Live and More) on Billboard charts simultaneously.
- November 27 – Def Leppard's permanent drummer Rick Allen joins the band at the age of 15.
- December – Soviet orchestral conductor defects to the Netherlands while on tour there.
- December 2 – The 7th OTI Festival, held at the Municipal Theatre in Santiago, Chile, is won by the song "El amor... cosa tan rara", written and performed by Denisse de Kalafe representing Brazil.
- December 31
  - Matthias Jabs joins Scorpions, replacing Uli Jon Roth.
  - The seventh annual New Year's Rockin' Eve special airs on ABC, with performances by Barry Manilow, Village People, Chuck Mangione, Tanya Tucker and Rick James.
  - CBS airs New Year's Eve with Guy Lombardo for the final time, nearly two years after the band leader's death and ending a 22-year run that began in 1956.
  - The Winterland Ballroom venue in San Francisco closes with a New Year's Eve performance by the Grateful Dead, New Riders of the Purple Sage and the Blues Brothers.
  - Iron Maiden records a demo, consisting of four songs, at Spaceward Studios in Cambridge which would eventually become The Soundhouse Tapes.

=== Also in 1978 ===
- Kenny Rogers continues his highly successful solo career with the single (and album) "The Gambler" and will go on to star in no less than five movies based around the song.
- In the UK, singles sales are at their all-time high this year, boosted by the simultaneous peak of the disco and punk phenomena and the success of singles from the movie Grease.
- Mozambique holds its first National Dance Festival, involving half a million people.
- Rolnicka Praha children's choir is founded in Prague, Czech Republic.

== Bands formed ==
- See Category:Musical groups established in 1978

== Bands disbanded ==
- See Category:Musical groups disestablished in 1978

== Albums released ==
=== January ===
Day	Album	Artist	Notes
2	We All Know Who We Are	Cameo	
3	Level Headed	Sweet	
3	White Hot	Angel	
18	Excitable Boy	Warren Zevon	
19	Pastiche	The Manhattan Transfer	
20	City to City	Gerry Rafferty	
20	White Music	XTC	Debut
27	Bootsy? Player of the Year	Bootsy's Rubber Band	
30	Infinity	Journey	
?	Attention Shoppers!	Starz	
?	Champagne Jam	Atlanta Rhythm Section	
?	Endless Wire	Gordon Lightfoot	
?	I'm Ready	Muddy Waters	
?	The Modern Dance	Pere Ubu	Debut
?	Open Fire	Ronnie Montrose	Debut
?	Quarter Moon in a Ten Cent Town	Emmylou Harris	
?	Street Player	Rufus	
?	Ten Years of Gold	Kenny Rogers	Compilation
?	Waylon & Willie	Waylon Jennings and Willie Nelson	First collaborative album as a duo

=== February ===
Day	Album	Artist	Notes
6	Earth	Jefferson Starship	
10	British Lions	British Lions	Debut as British Lions; a majority of band members were previously in Mott The Hoople
10	It Begins Again	Dusty Springfield	
10	Stained Class	Judas Priest	
10	Van Halen	Van Halen	Debut
10	Waiting for Columbus	Little Feat	Live
17	Crossing the Red Sea with The Adverts	The Adverts	Debut
17	Impeckable	Budgie	
17	The Kick Inside	Kate Bush	Debut
24	Watch	Manfred Mann's Earth Band	
27	Macho Man	Village People	
?	Street Hassle	Lou Reed	
?	Double Live Gonzo!	Ted Nugent	Live
?	Casino	Al Di Meola	
?	All This And Heaven Too	Andrew Gold	
?	Animal Games	London	Debut, and only release with original lineup featuring Jon Moss, later of Culture Club
?	Bring It Back Alive	Outlaws	Live
?	Tell Us the Truth	Sham 69	Debut
?	Drastic Plastic	Be-Bop Deluxe	Final album
?	Easter Island	Kris Kristofferson	
?	Even Now	Barry Manilow	
?	Frank Marino and Mahogany Rush – Live	Mahogany Rush	Live
?	It Happened One Bite	Dan Hicks	
?	Let's Keep It That Way	Anne Murray	
?	Plastic Letters	Blondie	
?	Street Action	Bachman–Turner Overdrive	
?	What Do You Want from Live	The Tubes	Live

=== March ===
Day	Album	Artist	Notes
2	Quiet Riot	Quiet Riot	Released only in Japan
3	A Song for All Seasons	Renaissance	
3	Easter	Patti Smith Group	
3	Southern Winds	Maria Muldaur	
3	Zappa in New York	Frank Zappa	Live
6	A Biography	John Mellencamp	as Johnny Cougar
10	Northwinds	David Coverdale	
10	Another Music in a Different Kitchen	Buzzcocks	Debut
13	Double Dose	Hot Tuna	Live
13	Gettin' the Spirit	Roberta Kelly	
13	Guilty Until Proven Insane	Skyhooks	
13	You Light Up My Life	Johnny Mathis	-
17	Double Fun	Robert Palmer	
17	Generation X	Generation X	
17	Son of a Son of a Sailor	Jimmy Buffett	
17	This Year's Model	Elvis Costello and the Attractions	
23	Kaya	Bob Marley & The Wailers	
31	...And Then There Were Three...	Genesis	
31	London Town	Wings	
?	Adolescent Sex	Japan	
?	First Glance	April Wine	
?	Hope & Anchor Front Row Festival	Various Artists	Live
?	Jesus of Cool	Nick Lowe	titled Pure Pop for Now People in US
?	The Rutles	The Rutles	Soundtrack
?	Some Things Don't Come Easy	England Dan & John Ford Coley	
?	Squeeze	Squeeze	
?	Warmer Communications	Average White Band	
?	What If	Dixie Dregs	

=== April ===
Day	Album	Artist	Notes
7	For You	Prince	
7	Hermit of Mink Hollow	Todd Rundgren	
7	The Last Waltz	The Band	Soundtrack
10	Heavy Horses	Jethro Tull	
12	FM	Various Artists	Soundtrack
13	Almighty Fire	Aretha Franklin	
13	I Would Like to See You Again	Johnny Cash	
14	U.K.	U.K.	Debut
14	Long Live Rock 'n' Roll	Rainbow	-
14	Grease: The Original Soundtrack from the Motion Picture	Various Artists	Soundtrack
17	Mutiny Up My Sleeve	Max Webster	
19	Tasty	Patti LaBelle	
20	Come Get It!	Rick James	
21	Bad Boy	Ringo Starr	
24	Cold Chisel	Cold Chisel	
24	Heaven Tonight	Cheap Trick	
25	Showdown	The Isley Brothers	
28	The Man-Machine	Kraftwerk	
?	Adventure	Television	
?	After the Heat	Eno, Moebius, and Roedelius	
?	Boys in the Trees	Carly Simon	
?	Cats Under the Stars	Jerry Garcia Band	
?	Double Platinum	Kiss	Compilation
?	Future Bound	Tavares	
?	A Live Record	Camel	Live
?	Magazine	Heart	Re-issue with re-recordings
?	The Only Ones	The Only Ones	
?	Please Don't Touch	Steve Hackett	
?	Rainbow Takeaway	Kevin Ayers	
?	Saga	Saga	
?	Stardust	Willie Nelson	
?	V2	The Vibrators	
?	You Can Tune a Piano, but You Can't Tuna Fish	REO Speedwagon	

=== May ===
Day	Album	Artist	Notes
2	David Bowie Narrates Prokofiev's Peter and the Wolf	David Bowie with the Philadelphia Orchestra	
2	We'll Sing in the Sunshine	Helen Reddy	
2	You're Gonna Get It!	Tom Petty and the Heartbreakers	
5	Powerage	AC/DC	UK
5	Stranger in Town	Bob Seger and the Silver Bullet Band	
12	Black and White	The Stranglers	
12	Natural Force	Bonnie Tyler	
15	Hopes and Fears	Art Bears	Debut
16	Bruised Orange	John Prine	
16	But Seriously, Folks...	Joe Walsh	
16	Livetime	Hall & Oates	Live
19	Misfits	The Kinks	
26	David Gilmour	David Gilmour	Solo Debut
26	Pyramid	The Alan Parsons Project	
26	Worlds Away	Pablo Cruise	
23	Togetherness	L.T.D	
?	Eternally Yours	The Saints	
?	The Image Has Cracked	Alternative TV	
?	Love Me Again	Rita Coolidge	
?	Natural High	Commodores	
?	The Parkerilla	Graham Parker and The Rumour	Live
?	Reckless	The Sports	
?	Songbird	Barbra Streisand	
?	Stone Blue	Foghat	
?	Welcome Home	Carole King	

=== June ===
Day	Album	Artist	Notes
1	Instant Replay	Dan Hartman	
2	Peter Gabriel	Peter Gabriel	
2	Snakebite	Whitesnake	EP
2	Darkness on the Edge of Town	Bruce Springsteen	
2	Live and Dangerous	Thin Lizzy	Live
6	The Cars	The Cars	
7	Fame	Grace Jones	
9	Dire Straits	Dire Straits	
9	Jeff Wayne's Musical Version of The War of the Worlds	Jeff Wayne	
9	Some Girls	The Rolling Stones	
9	Octave	The Moody Blues	
15	Living Room Suite	Harry Chapin	
15	Street-Legal	Bob Dylan	
15	Sunlight	Herbie Hancock	
19	Thick as Thieves	Trooper	
20	Double Vision	Foreigner	
23	Nightflight to Venus	Boney M	
23	Obsession	UFO	
?	Face to Face	The Angels	
?	If I Weren't So Romantic I'd Shoot You	Derringer	
?	Lights from the Valley	Chilliwack	
?	Nested	Laura Nyro	
?	Real Life	Magazine	
?	See Forever Eyes	Prism	
?	Shadow Dancing	Andy Gibb	
?	Struck Down	Yesterday and Today	
?	A Tonic for the Troops	The Boomtown Rats	
?	We Have Come for Your Children	Dead Boys	

=== July ===
Day	Album	Artist	Notes
12	Nightwatch	Kenny Loggins	
14	More Songs About Buildings and Food	Talking Heads	
17	Sgt. Pepper's Lonely Hearts Club Band	Various Artists	Soundtrack
17	Cheryl Lynn	Cheryl Lynn	
17	Heartbreaker	Dolly Parton	
20	Touchdown	Bob James	
21	Can't Stand the Rezillos	The Rezillos	Debut
?	Alicia Bridges	Alicia Bridges	
?	Americana	Leon Russell	
?	Dream of a Child	Burton Cummings	
?	Handsworth Revolution	Steel Pulse	
?	Hobo with a Grin	Steve Harley	
?	I've Always Been Crazy	Waylon Jennings	
?	Love or Something Like It	Kenny Rogers	
?	Midstream	Debby Boone	
?	Nite Flights	The Walker Brothers	
?	Norma Jean	Norma Jean Wright	
?	Out of Reach	Can	
?	Under Wraps	Shaun Cassidy	

=== August ===
Day	Album	Artist	Notes
7	Roberta Flack	Roberta Flack	
11	C'est Chic	Chic	
14	Lanquidity	Sun Ra	
15	Don't Look Back	Boston	
21	Who Are You	The Who	
21	Along the Red Ledge	Hall & Oates	
28	Q. Are We Not Men? A: We Are Devo!	Devo	Debut
31	Live and More	Donna Summer	Double LP; 3 sides live, 1 side studio
?	All Night Long	Sammy Hagar	Live
?	Caravan to Midnight	Robin Trower	
?	Chairs Missing	Wire	
?	Danger Zone	Player	
?	Do It All Night	Curtis Mayfield	
?	Frozen in the Night	Dan Hill	
?	Is It Still Good To Ya	Ashford & Simpson	
?	Jass-Ay-Lay-Dee	Ohio Players	
?	Kingdom of Madness	Magnum	
?	Luxury You Can Afford	Joe Cocker	
?	Rose Royce III: Strikes Again!	Rose Royce	
?	Sir Army Suit	Klaatu	
?	Tokyo Tapes	Scorpions	Live
?	Twin Sons of Different Mothers	Dan Fogelberg and Tim Weisberg	
?	Well Kept Secret	Juice Newton	
?	White, Hot and Blue	Johnny Winter	
?	Who Do Ya (Love)	KC and the Sunshine Band	
?	With Luv'	Luv'	

=== September ===
Day	Album	Artist	Notes
1	Bloody Tourists	10cc	
1	The Bride Stripped Bare	Bryan Ferry	
1	Molly Hatchet	Molly Hatchet	
5	Blue Valentine	Tom Waits	
5	Skynyrd's First and... Last	Lynyrd Skynyrd	Recorded 1971–'72
8	Parallel Lines	Blondie	
8	Stage	David Bowie	Live
8	Systems of Romance	Ultravox	
8	Time Passages	Al Stewart	-
8	Tracks on Wax 4	Dave Edmunds	
11	Giant for a Day	Gentle Giant	
15	Studio Tan	Frank Zappa	
18	Ace Frehley	Ace Frehley	
18	Gene Simmons	Gene Simmons	
18	Paul Stanley	Paul Stanley	
18	Peter Criss	Peter Criss	
19	All Fly Home	Al Jarreau	
19	Living in the USA	Linda Ronstadt	
22	Tormato	Yes	
22	Breathless	Camel	
22	Bursting Out	Jethro Tull	Live
22	Grab It for a Second	Golden Earring	
22	Road to Ruin	Ramones	
22	Love Bites	Buzzcocks	
22	The Man	Barry White	
22	One Nation Under a Groove	Funkadelic	
22	Wet Dream	Richard Wright	
25	Cruisin'	Village People	
25	Ugly Ego	Cameo	
29	Never Say Die!	Black Sabbath	
29	Green Light	Cliff Richard	
29	Nicolette	Nicolette Larson	
?	Pieces of Eight	Styx	
?	Gillan	Gillan	Japan
?	Back on the Streets	Gary Moore	
?	Fallen Angel	Uriah Heep	
?	Flamin' Groovies Now	Flamin' Groovies	
?	Leo Sayer	Leo Sayer	
?	Mr. Gone	Weather Report	
?	Ross	Diana Ross	
?	Dog & Butterfly	Heart	
?	O Zambezi	Dragon	
?	Rough	Tina Turner	
?	Some Enchanted Evening	Blue Öyster Cult	Live
?	Wavelength	Van Morrison	
?	Weekend Warriors	Ted Nugent	
?	X	Klaus Schulze	
?	Feel the Need	Leif Garrett	

=== October ===
Day	Album	Artist	Notes
2	Hot Streets	Chicago	
2	M.I.U. Album	The Beach Boys	
6	25 Years On	Hawkwind	as Hawklords
6	Go 2	XTC	
6	No Smoke Without Fire	Wishbone Ash	
6	Pleasure and Pain	Dr. Hook	
6	So Alone	Johnny Thunders	
10	Toto	Toto	Debut
11	52nd Street	Billy Joel	
12	Chaka	Chaka Khan	
13	If You Want Blood You've Got It	AC/DC	Live
13	Photo-Finish	Rory Gallagher	
13	Comes a Time	Neil Young	
13	Christmas Portrait	The Carpenters	Christmas
13	Fool Around	Rachel Sweet	UK version
24	Hemispheres	Rush	
25	Thousand Knives	Ryuichi Sakamoto	Debut
27	A Single Man	Elton John	
27	Obscure Alternatives	Japan	
27	Slade Alive, Vol. 2	Slade	Live
30	Pain Killer	Krokus	
31	Thoroughfare Gap	Stephen Stills	
?	Against the Grain	Phoebe Snow	
?	Brass Construction IV	Brass Construction	
?	Coliseum Rock	Starz	
?	Don't Cry Out Loud	Melissa Manchester	
?	Everybody's Dancin'	Kool & the Gang	
?	If You Can't Stand the Heat...	Status Quo	
?	Inner Secrets	Santana	
?	Live! Bootleg	Aerosmith	Live
?	Money Talks	The Bar-Kays	
?	Music for Films	Brian Eno	
?	New Dimensions	The Three Degrees	
?	Not Available	The Residents	
?	Playin' to Win	Outlaws	
?	Pleasure Train	Teri Desario	
?	Prehistoric Sounds	The Saints	
?	Private Practice	Dr. Feelgood	
?	Shiny Beast (Bat Chain Puller)	Captain Beefheart	
?	Trouble	Whitesnake	Debut
?	Two for the Show	Kansas	Live
?	You Had to Be There	Jimmy Buffett	Live

=== November ===
Day	Album	Artist	Notes
1	Midnight Oil	Midnight Oil	
3	Killing Machine	Judas Priest	
3	All Mod Cons	The Jam	
3	You Don't Bring Me Flowers	Neil Diamond	
10	Jazz	Queen	
10	Lionheart	Kate Bush	
10	Give 'Em Enough Rope	The Clash	
10	Babylon by Bus	Bob Marley & The Wailers	Live
10	Germfree Adolescents	X-Ray Spex	
13	The Scream	Siouxsie and the Banshees	Debut
15	Barbra Streisand's Greatest Hits Vol. 2	Barbra Streisand	Compilation
15	Shakedown Street	Grateful Dead	
17	Outlandos d'Amour	The Police	Debut
17	From the Inside	Alice Cooper	
17	Love Beach	Emerson, Lake & Palmer	
17	Born to Be Alive	Patrick Hernandez	Debut
17	Dub Housing	Pere Ubu	
20	Motor Booty Affair	Parliament	
22	Variations	Andrew Lloyd Webber	
23	The Best of Earth, Wind & Fire, Vol. 1	Earth, Wind & Fire	Compilation
24	Blondes Have More Fun	Rod Stewart	
24	Tubeway Army	Tubeway Army	Debut
24	Yellow Magic Orchestra	Yellow Magic Orchestra	
27	Wings Greatest	Wings	Compilation
27	Love Tracks	Gloria Gaynor	
28	Briefcase Full of Blues	The Blues Brothers	Live
30	Greatest Hits	Steely Dan	Compilation
?	Destiny	The Jacksons	
?	Backless	Eric Clapton	
?	Crazy Moon	Crazy Horse	
?	Nina Hagen Band	Nina Hagen Band	
?	Crosswinds	Peabo Bryson	
?	Duck Stab/Buster & Glen	The Residents	
?	Energy	The Pointer Sisters	
?	The Gambler	Kenny Rogers	
?	Greatest Hits	Barry Manilow	Compilation
?	Greatest Hits 1974–78	Steve Miller Band	Compilation
?	Legend	Poco	
?	Live: Take No Prisoners	Lou Reed	Live
?	Move It On Over	George Thorogood & The Destroyers	
?	Profile: Best of Emmylou Harris	Emmylou Harris	Compilation
?	Rose Tattoo	Rose Tattoo	
?	Sanctuary	The J. Geils Band	
?	So Young	Jo Jo Zep & The Falcons	Mini-LP
?	TNT	Tanya Tucker	

=== December ===
Day	Album	Artist	Notes
1	Incantations	Mike Oldfield	
1	Equinoxe	Jean Michel Jarre	
1	Back to Earth	Cat Stevens	
1	If You Knew Suzi...	Suzi Quatro	
1	Minute by Minute	The Doobie Brothers	
2	Quiet Riot II	Quiet Riot	Japan
4	D.o.A: The Third and Final Report of Throbbing Gristle	Throbbing Gristle	
8	Public Image: First Issue	Public Image Ltd	
15	Here, My Dear	Marvin Gaye	
	Back to the Bars	Todd Rundgren	Live
	American Dreams	Jesse Colin Young	
	Natural Act	Kris Kristofferson and Rita Coolidge	

=== Release date unknown ===
- 2 Hot – Peaches & Herb
- 3 Phasis – Cecil Taylor
- Africa Must Be Free by 1983 – Hugh Mundell
- Alive on Arrival – Steve Forbert
- Awaiting Your Reply – Resurrection Band
- Animal House – Various Artists – Soundtrack
- At the Third Stroke – Russ Ballard
- At Yankee Stadium – NRBQ
- Best Dressed Chicken in Town – Dr. Alimantado
- The Best of Bette – Bette Midler
- Black Noise – FM
- Blam! – The Brothers Johnson
- Bloodbrothers – The Dictators
- Bobby Caldwell – Bobby Caldwell
- Book Early – City Boy
- Bop-Be – Keith Jarrett
- Burchfield Nines – Michael Franks
- Bush Doctor – Peter Tosh
- Carlene Carter – Carlene Carter
- Cecil Taylor Unit – Cecil Taylor
- Central Heating – Heatwave
- Cha Cha – Herman Brood – Live
- Cheryl Ladd – Cheryl Ladd
- Chuck Berry Live in Concert – Chuck Berry – Live
- Cidade do Salvador – Gilberto Gil
- City Lights – Dr. John
- Count Basie Meets Oscar Peterson – The Timekeepers – Count Basie and Oscar Peterson
- The Cream – John Lee Hooker
- Departure from the Northern Wasteland – Michael Hoenig
- The Dirt Band – Nitty Gritty Dirt Band
- DMZ – DMZ
- Dream – Captain & Tennille
- Dream Dancing – Ella Fitzgerald
- Dream of a Child – Burton Cummings
- Durch die Wüste – Hans-Joachim Roedelius
- Every Time Two Fools Collide – Kenny Rogers & Dottie West
- Final Exam – Loudon Wainwright III
- Finzi: Cello Concerto, Clarinet Concerto – Yo-Yo Ma (Debut)
- From Rats to Riches – Good Rats
- Funk or Walk – The Brides of Funkenstein
- Funky Situation – Wilson Pickett
- Further Adventures Of – Bruce Cockburn
- Génération 78 – Dalida
- Get It Out'cha System – Millie Jackson
- Get Off – Foxy
- Girl Most Likely – Claudja Barry
- Golden Country Origins – Bill Haley (pre-Comets recordings)
- Greatest Hits – Captain & Tennille
- Guaranteed – Ronnie Drew
- Headin' Down into the Mystery Below – John Hartford
- Heat in the Street – Pat Travers
- Honky Tonk Masquerade – Joe Ely
- Hot Dawg – David Grisman
- How Long Has This Been Going On? – Sarah Vaughan
- I Love My Music – Wild Cherry
- The Incredible Shrinking Dickies – The Dickies
- Janis Ian – Janis Ian
- Killin' Time – Gasolin'
- Life Beyond L.A. – Ambrosia
- Life in a Scotch Sitting Room, Vol. 2 – Ivor Cutler
- Live at Last – Steeleye Span
- Live Floating Anarchy 1977 – Gong
- Live in London – Helen Reddy
- Live in the Black Forest – Cecil Taylor
- Live Tonite – Prism – live album
- The Loop – Andrew Cyrille
- Mama Let Him Play – Jerry Doucette
- Marcus' Children – Burning Spear
- Meanwhile Back in Paris – Streetheart
- Metamusicians' Stomp – Andrew Cyrille and Maono
- Midnight Believer – B. B. King
- Modra Rijeka – Indexi
- Music for 18 Musicians – Steve Reich
- Night Rider – Count Basie and Oscar Peterson
- No New York – Various Artists
- Of Queues and Cures – National Health
- The Paris Concert – Oscar Peterson
- Pat Metheny Group – Pat Metheny Group
- Pleasure Principle – Parlet
- Portrait of the Artist as a Young Ram – Ram Jam
- Power in the Darkness – Tom Robinson Band
- Pronto Monto – Kate and Anna McGarrigle
- Queen of the Night – Loleatta Holloway
- Raydio – Raydio
- Return of the Wanderer – Dion DiMucci
- Return to Magenta – Mink DeVille
- Salterbarty Tales – Earthstar
- Sherbet – Sherbet
- The Shirts – The Shirts
- Shpritsz – Herman Brood
- Sleeper Catcher – Little River Band
- So Full of Love – The O'Jays
- Solar Music – Live – Grobschnitt
- Sounds...and Stuff Like That!! – Quincy Jones
- Spyro Gyra – Spyro Gyra
- Step II – Sylvester
- Strangers in the Wind – Bay City Rollers
- Super Blue – Freddie Hubbard
- Survivor – Randy Bachman
- A Taste of Honey – A Taste of Honey
- That's Life – Sham 69
- There's a Light Beyond These Woods – Nanci Griffith
- There's No Good in Goodbye – The Manhattans
- Third – Big Star
- Together Again: For the First Time – Mel Tormé, Buddy Rich
- To the Limit – Joan Armatrading
- Totally Hot – Olivia Newton-John
- A Touch on the Rainy Side – Jesse Winchester
- Truth n' Time – Al Green
- Visions of the Country – Robbie Basho
- Viva – La Düsseldorf
- Von Gestern bis Heute – Die Flippers
- Way of the Sun – Jade Warrior
- Weekend in L.A. – George Benson
- Whatever Happened to Benny Santini? – Chris Rea
- When I Dream – Crystal Gayle
- Who's Happy Now? – Connie Francis
- The Wonderful Grand Band – The Wonderful Grand Band

== Biggest hit singles ==
The following songs achieved the highest chart positions in the charts of 1978.

#	Artist	Title	Year	Country	Chart entries
1	Bee Gees	Stayin' Alive	1977	(Australia) / (United Kingdom)	US BB 1 – Dec 1977, Canada 1 – Jan 1978, Netherlands 1 – Feb 1978, France 1 – Feb 1978, Italy 1 of 1978, Australia 1 for 7 weeks Jan 1979, US CashBox 2 of 1978, Austria 2 – Apr 1978, Switzerland 2 – Mar 1978, Germany 2 – Mar 1978, Scrobulate 2 of disco, Sweden (alt) 3 – Mar 1978, UK 4 – Feb 1978, Norway 4 – Mar 1978, Australia 4 of 1978, South Africa 4 of 1978, US BB 8 of 1978, POP 8 of 1978, AFI 9, OzNet 9, Party 13 of 2007, RYM 34 of 1977, Europe 36 of the 1970s, 80 in 2FM list, RIAA 94, Acclaimed 98, Germany 100 of the 1970s, Rolling Stone 189
2	John Travolta & Olivia Newton-John	You're the One That I Want	1978	(United States) / (Australia)	UK 1 – May 1978, US BB 1 – Apr 1978, Canada 1 – Apr 1978, Netherlands 1 – May 1978, Sweden (alt) 1 – Jul 1978, Switzerland 1 – Jul 1978, Norway 1 – Jul 1978, Australia 1 of 1978, Germany 1 – Jun 1978, Republic of Ireland 1 – Jun 1978, Australia 1 for 2 weeks Apr 1979, Austria 2 – Jul 1978, France 5 – May 1978, US CashBox 9 of 1978, Italy 12 of 1978, POP 15 of 1978, US BB 17 of 1978, Germany 17 of the 1970s, South Africa 17 of 1978, TOTP 20, Poland 26 – Jul 1998, Global 33 (5 M sold) – 1978, Europe 72 of the 1970s, RYM 153 of 1978
3	Village People	Y.M.C.A.	1978	(United States)	UK 1 – Nov 1978, Netherlands 1 – Dec 1978, Sweden (alt) 1 – Dec 1978, Austria 1 – Jan 1979, Switzerland 1 – Dec 1978, Germany 1 – Jan 1979, Republic of Ireland 1 – Jan 1979, Australia 1 for 5 weeks Oct 1979, POP 1 of 1979, US BB 2 – Nov 1978, Canada 2 – Dec 1978, Norway 2 – Jan 1979, US BB 3 of 1979, France 3 – Dec 1978, Party 03 of 1999, US CashBox 4 of 1979, Global 7 (10 M sold) – 1978, Australia 15 of 1979, Germany 23 of the 1970s, Scrobulate 38 of disco, Europe 86 of the 1970s, RIAA 86, RYM 95 of 1978, Acclaimed 1662
4	Boney M	Rivers of Babylon	1978	(Germany)	UK 1 – Apr 1978, Netherlands 1 – Apr 1978, Sweden (alt) 1 – May 1978, France 1 – May 1978, Austria 1 – May 1978, Switzerland 1 – Apr 1978, Norway 1 – May 1978, Germany 1 – Apr 1978, Republic of Ireland 1 – May 1978, Australia 1 for 6 weeks Apr 1979, South Africa 1 of 1978, Australia 3 of 1978, Germany 3 of the 1970s, TOTP 8, US BB 30 – Jul 1978, Italy 36 of 1978, RYM 77 of 1978, Global 100 (5 M sold) – 1978, OzNet 867
5	Bee Gees	Night Fever	1978	(Australia) / (United Kingdom)	UK 1 – Apr 1978, US BB 1 – Feb 1978, US CashBox 1 of 1978, Canada 1 – Feb 1978, France 1 – Apr 1978, Republic of Ireland 1 – Apr 1978, Norway 2 – May 1978, Germany 2 – May 1978, Netherlands 3 – Apr 1978, Switzerland 3 – May 1978, Austria 4 – Jun 1978, Sweden (alt) 5 – May 1978, US BB 10 of 1978, POP 11 of 1978, South Africa 12 of 1978, Italy 29 of 1978, Scrobulate 39 of 70s, RYM 59 of 1978, Party 77 of 1999, Germany 94 of the 1970s, Europe 96 of the 1970s, OzNet 894, Acclaimed 2046

== Chronological table of US and UK and Japan number one hit singles ==
US number one singles and artist
(weeks at number one)

- "How Deep Is Your Love" – Bee Gees (2 weeks in 1977 + 1 week in 1978)
- "Baby Come Back" – Player (3)
- "Stayin' Alive" – Bee Gees (4)
- "(Love Is) Thicker Than Water" – Andy Gibb (2)
- "Night Fever" – Bee Gees (8), best selling single of the year
- "If I Can't Have You" – Yvonne Elliman (1)
- "With a Little Luck" – Paul McCartney & Wings (2)
- "Too Much, Too Little, Too Late" – Johnny Mathis & Deniece Williams (1)
- "You're The One That I Want" – John Travolta & Olivia Newton-John (1)
- "Shadow Dancing" – Andy Gibb (7)
- "Miss You" – The Rolling Stones (1)
- "Three Times a Lady" – Commodores (2)
- "Grease" – Frankie Valli (2)
- "Boogie Oogie Oogie" – A Taste of Honey (3)
- "Kiss You All Over" – Exile (4)
- "Hot Child in the City" – Nick Gilder (1)
- "You Needed Me" – Anne Murray (1)
- "MacArthur Park" – Donna Summer (3)
- "You Don't Bring Me Flowers" – Barbra Streisand & Neil Diamond (2)
- "Le Freak" – Chic (3 weeks in 1978 + 3 weeks in 1979)

UK number one singles and artist
(weeks at number one)

- "Mull of Kintyre" / "Girls' School" – Paul McCartney & Wings (5 weeks in 1977 + 4 weeks in 1978)
- "Uptown Top Ranking" – Althea & Donna (1)
- "Figaro" – Brotherhood of Man (1)
- "Take a Chance On Me" – ABBA (3)
- "Wuthering Heights" – Kate Bush (4)
- "Matchstalk Men and Matchstalk Cats and Dogs" – Brian and Michael (3)
- "Night Fever" – Bee Gees (2)
- "Rivers of Babylon" – Boney M (5) best selling single of the year
- "You're the One That I Want" – John Travolta & Olivia Newton-John (9)
- "Three Times a Lady" – Commodores (5)
- "Dreadlock Holiday" – 10cc (1)
- "Summer Nights" – John Travolta & Olivia Newton-John (7)
- "Rat Trap" – The Boomtown Rats (2)
- "Da Ya Think I'm Sexy?" – Rod Stewart (1)
- "Mary's Boy Child"/"Oh My Lord" – Boney M (4)

Japanese Oricon number one singles and artist
(weeks at number one)

- "UFO" – Pink Lady (2 weeks in 1977 + 8 weeks in 1978)
- "Canada Kara no Tegami" – Masaaki Hirao & Yōko Hatanaka (2)
- "Hohoemi Gaeshi" – Candies (3)
- "Southpaw" – Pink Lady (9)
- "Darling" – Kenji Sawada (1)
- "Jikan yo Tomare" – Eikichi Yazawa (3)
- "Mr. Summertime" – Circus (1)
- "Monster" – Pink Lady (8)
- "Hikigane" – Masanori Sera & Twist (1)
- "Kimi no Hitomi wa 10,000 Volt" – Takao Horiuchi (4)
- "Tomei Ningen" – Pink Lady (4)
- "Kisetsu no Naka de" – Chiharu Matsuyama (6)
- "Chameleon Army" – Pink Lady (2 weeks in 1978 + 4 weeks in 1979)

== Top 40 Chart hit singles ==
Song title	Artist(s)	Release date(s)	US	UK	Highest chart position	Other Chart Performance(s)
"5–7–0–5"	City Boy	August 1978	27	8	8 (United Kingdom)	11 (Australia) – 55 (Canada)
"A-Ba-Ni-Bi"	Izhar Cohen & The Alphabeta	April 1978	n/a	20	20 (United Kingdom)	22 (Germany)
"A Little Lovin' (Keeps the Doctor Away)"	The Raes	December 1978	61	n/a	11 (Canada)	5 (US Billboard Dance Club Songs) - 60 (US Record World/Pop Chart) - 66 (US Cash Box Top 100)
"Ain't Talkin' 'Bout Love"	Van Halen	October 1978	n/a	n/a	19 (United States)	See chart performance entry
"Airport"	The Motors	June 1978	n/a	4	3 (Israel)	See chart performance entry
"Alive Again"	Chicago	October 1978	14	n/a	11 (Canada)	13 (U.S. Cash Box Top 100) – 39 (US Billboard Hot Adult Contemporary Tracks)
"Another Night on the Road"	Sherbet	July 1978	n/a	n/a	10 (Australia)	See chart performance entry
"Are You Old Enough?"	Dragon	August 1978	n/a	n/a	1 (Australia)	6 (New Zealand)
"B-A-B-Y"	Rachel Sweet	December 1978	n/a	35	35 (United Kingdom)	47 (Australia)
"Baby Hold On"	Eddie Money	January 1978	11	n/a	4 (Canada)	5 (U.S. Cash Box Top 100) – 19 (Australia) – 41 (Netherlands [Single Top 100])
"Baker Street"	Gerry Rafferty	February 1978	2	3	1 (Australia, Canada, South Africa)	See chart performance entry
"Because the Night"	Patti Smith Group	March 1978	13	5	5 (United Kingdom)	9 (Ireland) – 34 (Sweden)
"Best of Both Worlds"	Robert Palmer	April 1978	n/a	92	4 (Belgium)	See chart performance entry
"Blame It on the Boogie"	The Jacksons	September 1978	54	8	4 (Australia)	7 (Ireland) – 6 (New Zealand)
"Blue Collar Man (Long Nights)"	Styx	September 1978	21	n/a	9 (Canada)	20 (U.S. Cash Box Top 100) – 47 (Netherlands [Single Top 100]) – 98 (Australia)
"Bluer Than Blue"	Michael Johnson	April 1978	12	n/a	1 (Canada)	1 (US Billboard Adult Contemporary) – 6 (Canadian RPM Top Singles) – 10 (US Cash Box Top 100) – 24 (New Zealand)
"Brown Girl in the Ring"	Boney M.	April 1978	n/a	1	1 (Europe)	See chart performance entry
"Ça plane pour moi"	Plastic Bertrand	January 1978	47	8	1 (France, Switzerland)	See chart performance entry
"Can We Still Be Friends"	Todd Rundgren	May 1978	29	n/a	8 (Australia)	37 (Canada Top Singles) – 45 (Canada Adult Contemporary)
"Can't Smile Without You"	Barry Manilow	February 1978	3	4	3 (United States)	3 (Australia) – 1 (Canada)
"Can't Stand Losing You"	The Police	August 1978	n/a	42	42 (United Kingdom)	98 (Australia) – 12 (Ireland)
"Clash City Rockers"	The Clash	February 1978	n/a	35	35 (United Kingdom)	38 (Ireland)
"Coming Home"	Marshall Hain	September 1978	n/a	39	39 (United Kingdom)	44 (Germany)
"Copacabana (At the Copa)"	Barry Manilow	June 1978	8	42	8 (United States)	9 (Australia) – 7 (Canada) – 16 (Netherlands)
"Dance with Me"	Peter Brown	April 1978	8	57	8 (United States)	9 (Canada) – 52 (Australia)
"Dancing in the City"	Marshall Hain	June 1978	43	3	1 (Germany, South Africa)	See chart performance entry
"David Watts"	The Jam	August 1978	n/a	25	25 (United Kingdom)	14 (Ireland)
"Davy's on the Road Again"	Manfred Mann's Earth Band	April 1978	n/a	6	6 (United Kingdom)	49 (Australia) – 26 (Germany) – 5 (Ireland)
"Deep in the Motherlode"	Genesis	April 1978	79	n/a	79 (United States)	81 (Canada)
"Déjà Vu"	Dionne Warwick	November 1979	15	n/a	15 (United States)	25 (US Adult Contemporary) – 34 (Canada)
"Denis"	Blondie	February 1978	n/a	2	1 (Netherlands, Belgium)	See chart performance entry
"Don't Cry for Me Argentina"	The Shadows	December 1978	n/a	5	5 (United Kingdom)	30 (Ireland)
"Don't Cry Out Loud"	Melissa Manchester	October	10	n/a	9 (Canada)	2 (Canada RPM Adult Contemporary) – 9 (US Billboard Adult Contemporary) – 10 (US Cash Box Top 100) – 57 (Australia)
"Don't Look Back"	Boston	August 1978	4	43	4 (United States)	6 (Canada) – 14 (Netherlands) – 18 (New Zealand)
"(You Gotta Walk And) Don't Look Back"	Peter Tosh and Mick Jagger	November 1978	81	20	1 (Netherlands)	See chart performance entry
"Dust in the Wind"	Kansas	January 1978	6	n/a	3 (Canada)	52 (Australia) – 19 (Netherlands) – 36 (New Zealand)
"Eagle"	ABBA	May 1978	n/a	n/a	2 (Belgium)	See chart performance entry
"Ebony Eyes"	Bob Welch	January 1978	14	n/a	2 (Australia)	See chart performance entry
"Ego"	Elton John	March 1978	34	34	21 (Canada)	40 (Australia)
"Even Now"	Barry Manilow	April 1978	19	n/a	1 (United States)	See chart performance entry
"Every 1's a Winner"	Hot Chocolate	March 1978	6	12	6 (United States)	12 (Australia) – 11 (Ireland) – 7 (New Zealand)
"Everybody Dance"	Chic	April 1978	38	9	1 (United States)	See chart performance entry
"Every Kinda People"	Robert Palmer	March 1978	16	53	6 (France)	12 (Canada) – 22 (US Billboard Adult Contemporary) – 35 (Australia) – 35 (New Zealand)
"An Everlasting Love"	Andy Gibb	July 1978	5	10	2 (Canada)	See chart performance entry
"Feels So Good"	Chuck Mangione	February 1978	4	n/a	1 (Canada, United States)	See chart performance entry
"Flash Light"	Parliament	January 1978	16	n/a	1 (United States)	24 (Canada Top Singles)
"FM (No Static at All)"	Steely Dan	May 1978	22	49	1 (Spain)	See chart performance entry
"Follow You Follow Me"	Genesis	February 1978	23	7	7 (United Kingdom)	25 (Canada) – 8 (Germany) – 10 (Ireland)
"Fool (If You Think It's Over)"	Chris Rea	July 1978	12	30	1 (Canada, United States)	See chart performance entry
"Forever Autumn"	Justin Hayward	June 1978	47	5	3 (Ireland)	See chart performance entry
"The Gambler"	Kenny Rogers	November 1978	16	n/a	2 (Canada)	1 (US Billboard Hot Country Songs) – 16 (US Cash Box Top 100) – 10 (New Zealand)
"Goodnight Tonight"	Paul McCartney and Wings	March 1979	5	5	2 (Canada)	See chart performance entry
"Got to Get You into My Life"	Earth, Wind & Fire	July 1978	9	33	1 (United States)	20 (Canada) – 33 (New Zealand)
"Grease"	Frankie Valli	May 1978	1	3	1 (United States, Canada)	See chart performance entry
"Hammer Horror"	Kate Bush	October 1978	n/a	44	10 (Ireland)	17 (Australia) – 19 (New Zealand)
"Hanging on the Telephone"	Blondie	November 1978	n/a	5	5 (United Kingdom)	39 (Australia) – 16 (Ireland) – 22 (New Zealand)
"Heartless"	Heart	March 1978	24	n/a	18 (Canada)	25 (US Cash Box Top 100) – 59 (Australia)
"Here You Come Again"	Dolly Parton	September 1977	3	75	1 (United States)	2 (Canada) – 10 (Australia)
"Hey Deanie"	Shaun Cassidy	November 1977	7	n/a	1 (Canada)	7 (US Cash Box) – 12 (Germany)
"Hit Me with Your Rhythm Stick"	Ian Dury & The Blockheads	November 1978	n/a	1	1 (United Kingdom, Ireland, Germany)	See chart performance entry
"Hold the Line"	Toto	September 1978	5	14	5 (United States, Canada)	See chart performance entry
"Hollywood Nights"	Bob Seger and the Silver Bullet Band	August 1978	12	42	12 (United States)	17 (Canada) – 62 (Australia)
"Hopelessly Devoted to You"	Olivia Newton-John	September 1978	3	2	1 (Canada, Ireland)	See chart performance entry
"Hot Blooded"	Foreigner	June 1978	3	n/a	3 (United States)	24 (Australia) – 2 (Canada)
"Hot Child in the City"	Nick Gilder	June 1978	1	n/a	1 (United States, Canada)	11 (Australia) – 6 (New Zealand)
"Hot Legs" / "I Was Only Joking"	Rod Stewart	January 1978	28	5	4 (Ireland)	See chart performance entry
"How Much I Feel"	Ambrosia	August 1978	3	n/a	3 (United States)	4 (Canada) – 30 (New Zealand)
"How You Gonna See Me Now"	Alice Cooper	October 1978	12	61	9 (Australia)	12 (Canada) – 19 (New Zealand) – 73 (Netherlands)
"I Just Wanna Stop"	Gino Vannelli	August 1978	4	n/a	1 (Canada)	4 (US Cash Box Top 100) – 67 (Australia)
"I Love the Nightlife"	Alicia Bridges	June 1978	5	32	4 (Australia, Canada)	See chart performance entry
"I Love the Sound of Breaking Glass"	Nick Lowe	February 1978	n/a	7	7 (United Kingdom)	11 (Ireland) – 21 (Netherlands)
"I Was Made for Dancin'"	Leif Garrett	November 1978	10	4	2 (Germany)	See chart performance entry
"If You Can't Give Me Love"	Suzi Quatro	March 1978	45	4	1 (Germany)	See chart performance entry
"I'm Every Woman"	Chaka Khan	September 1978	21	11	1 (United States)	See chart performance entry
"Imaginary Lover"	Atlanta Rhythm Section	February 1978	7	n/a	7 (United States)	14 (Canada) – 38 (Australia)
"Instant Replay"	Dan Hartman	September 1978	29	8	1 (United States)	See chart performance entry
"Is This Love"	Bob Marley & The Wailers	February 1978	n/a	9	9 (United Kingdom)	11 (Netherlands) – 39 (New Zealand)
"Isn't It Time"	The Babys	January 1978	13	45	1 (Australia)	See chart performance entry
"It's a Heartache"	Bonnie Tyler	November 1977	3	4	1 (France, Canada, Norway)	See chart performance entry
"I've Had Enough"	Wings	June 1978	25	42	11 (Ireland)	24 (Canada) – 29 (New Zealand)
"Just the Way You Are"	Billy Joel	November 1977	3	19	2 (Canada)	See chart performance entry
"Just What I Needed"	The Cars	May 1978	27	17	17 (United Kingdom)	22 (Canada) – 38 (New Zealand)
"Just When I Needed You Most"	Randy Van Warmer	November 1978	4	8	1 (United States, Canada)	See chart performance entry
"Last Dance"	Donna Summer	May 1978	3	51	3 (United States, Canada)	See chart performance entry
"Lay Down Sally"	Eric Clapton	November 1977	3	39	1 (New Zealand, South Africa)	See chart performance entry
"Life's Been Good"	Joe Walsh	May 1978	12	14	11 (Canada)	28 (New Zealand) – 55 (Australia)
"A Little More Love"	Olivia Newton-John	October 1978	3	4	1 (Canada)	See chart performance entry
"Lotta Love"	Nicolette Larson	September 1978	8	n/a	2 (Canada)	5 (US Billboard Adult Contemporary) – 8 (US Cash Box Top 100) – 11 (Australia) – 22 (New Zealand)
"Love Is Like Oxygen"	Sweet	January 1978	8	9	4 (New Zealand)	9 (Australia) – 5 (Canada) – 10 (Germany)
"Love Will Find a Way"	Pablo Cruise	May 1978	6	n/a	4 (Canada)	7 (US Cash Box Top 100) – 22 (New Zealand)
"Magnet and Steel"	Walter Egan	May 1978	8	n/a	8 (United States)	9 (Canada) – 34 (Australia)
"Mammas Don't Let Your Babies Grow Up to Be Cowboys"	Waylon Jennings & Willie Nelson	January 1978	42	n/a	1 (United States, Canada)	57 (Australia)
"A Man I'll Never Be"	Boston	November 1978	31	n/a	27 (Canada)	41 (US Cash Box Top 100)
"The Man with the Child in His Eyes"	Kate Bush	May 1978	85	6	3 (Ireland)	22 (Australia) – 34 (New Zealand)
"Miss You"	The Rolling Stones	May 1978	1	3	1 (United States, Canada)	See chart performance entry
"More Than a Woman"	Tavares	November 1977	32	7	7 (United Kingdom)	29 (Canada) – 18 (Ireland) – 14 (Netherlands)
"Mr. Blue Sky"	Electric Light Orchestra	January 1978	35	6	6 (United Kingdom)	12 (Germany) – 28 (Netherlands)
"My Angel Baby"	Toby Beau	April 1978	13	n/a	1 (United States)	10 (Canada) – 25 (New Zealand) – 63 (Australia)
"My Best Friend's Girl"	The Cars	October 1978	35	3	3 (United Kingdom)	See chart performance entry
"My Life"	Billy Joel	October 1978	3	12	3 (United States, Canada)	See chart performance entry
"Native New Yorker"	Odyssey	November 1977	21	5	5 (United Kingdom)	See chart performance entry
"New York Groove"	Ace Frehley	September 1978	13	n/a	13 (United States)	22 (Canada) – 24 (New Zealand) – 34 (Australia)
"Northern Lights"	Renaissance	May 1978	n/a	10	10 (United Kingdom)	7 (UK Melody Maker) – 11 weeks on chart
"Oh Carol"	Smokie	May 1978	n/a	n/a	3 (Germany, Austria)	See chart performance entry
"One Nation Under a Groove"	Funkadelic	September 1978	28	9	1 (United States)	28 (New Zealand)
"Only You Can Rock Me"	UFO	June 1978	n/a	50	50 (United Kingdom)	31 (US Billboard Mainstream Rock)
"(Our Love) Don't Throw it All Away"	Andy Gibb	September 1978	9	32	2 (US Easy Listening)	7 (Canada) – 17 (US Cash Box)
"Paradise by the Dashboard Light"	Meat Loaf	August 1977	39	n/a	1 (Netherlands, Belgium)	See chart performance entry
"Part-Time Love"	Elton John	October 1978	22	15	12 (Australia)	13 (Canada) – 14 (New Zealand)
"Promises"	Eric Clapton	November 1978	9	37	9 (United States)	7 (Canada) – 35 (Australia)
"Prove It All Night"	Bruce Springsteen	May 1978	33	n/a	12 (Canada)	33 (US Billboard Hot 100) – 55 (Australia)
"Pump It Up"	Elvis Costello and the Attractions	June 1978	n/a	24	24 (United Kingdom)	55 (Australia)
"Raining in My Heart"	Leo Sayer	October 1978	47	21	47 (United States)	46 (Australia)
"Rasputin"	Boney M.	August 1978	n/a	2	1 (Germany, Austria)	See chart performance entry
"Ready to Take a Chance Again"	Barry Manilow	September 1978	11	n/a	1 (Canada)	See chart performance entry
"Reminiscing"	Little River Band	June 1978	3	n/a	2 (Canada)	35 (Australia) – 18 (New Zealand)
"Renegade"	Styx	January 1979	16	n/a	9 (Canada)	16 (US Billboard Hot 100)
"Right Down the Line"	Gerry Rafferty	July 1978	12	n/a	1 (United States)	5 (Canada Pop Singles) – 5 (Canada Adult Contemporary)
"Rivers of Babylon"	Boney M.	April 1978	30	1	1 (United Kingdom, Germany, Europe)	See chart performance entry
"Rock Lobster"	The B-52's	April 1978	56	37	3 (Australia)	1 (Canada) – 38 (New Zealand)
"Roxanne"	The Police	April 1978	32	12	12 (United Kingdom)	31 (Canada) – 22 (New Zealand)
"Runaway"	Jefferson Starship	May 1978	12	n/a	9 (Canada)	12 (US Billboard Hot 100)
"Runnin' with the Devil"	Van Halen	May 1978	84	n/a	84 (United States)	2 (Netherlands) – 14 (Belgium)
"Shame"	Evelyn King	May 1978	9	39	9 (United States)	See chart performance entry
"Sometimes When We Touch"	Dan Hill	November 1977	3	13	1 (Canada)	See chart performance entry
"Songbird"	Barbra Streisand	May 1978	25	n/a	1 (United States)	33 (Canada)
"Song for Guy"	Elton John	November 1978	n/a	4	4 (United Kingdom)	See chart performance entry
"Stay"	Jackson Browne	May 1978	20	12	12 (United Kingdom)	12 (Canada) – 59 (Australia)
"Still the Same"	Bob Seger and the Silver Bullet Band	April 1978	4	n/a	4 (United States)	See chart performance entry
"Straight On"	Heart	September 1978	15	n/a	14 (Canada)	15 (US Billboard Hot 100)
"Stuff Like That"	Quincy Jones	May 1978	21	34	1 (United States)	23 (Canada)
"Substitute"	Clout	November 1977	67	2	1 (Germany, South Africa, Ireland)	See chart performance entry
"Sultans of Swing"	Dire Straits	May 1978	4	8	4 (United States, Canada)	See chart performance entry
"Summer Night City"	ABBA	September 1978	n/a	5	1 (Sweden, Ireland, Finland)	See chart performance entry
"Summer Nights"	John Travolta & Olivia Newton-John	August 1978	5	1	1 (United Kingdom, Ireland)	See chart performance entry
"Sunday Girl"	Blondie	November 1978	n/a	1	1 (United Kingdom, Ireland, Australia)	See chart performance entry
"Sweet, Sweet Smile"	The Carpenters	January 1978	44	40	6 (United States)	7 (US Easy Listening) – 33 (Canada Top Singles)
"Sweet Talkin' Woman"	Electric Light Orchestra	February 1978	17	6	6 (United Kingdom, Ireland)	See chart performance entry
"Take a Chance on Me"	ABBA	January 1978	3	1	1 (United Kingdom, Austria, Ireland)	See chart performance entry
"Take Me to the River"	Talking Heads	October 1978	26	n/a	26 (United States)	34 (Canada) – 58 (Australia)
"Talking in Your Sleep"	Crystal Gayle	May 1978	18	11	1 (United States, Canada)	See chart performance entry
"Thank God It's Friday"	Love & Kisses	May 1978	22	n/a	1 (United States)	See chart performance entry
"Think It Over"	Cheryl Ladd	July 1978	34	n/a	29 (Canada)	34 (US Billboard Hot 100)
"Three Times a Lady"	Commodores	June 1978	1	1	1 (United States, United Kingdom)	See chart performance entry
"Thunder Island"	Jay Ferguson	November 1977	9	n/a	8 (Canada)	9 (US Billboard Hot 100)
"Time Passages"	Al Stewart	September 1978	7	n/a	1 (United States)	4 (Canada Pop Singles) – 14 (Canada AC)
"Too Much Heaven"	Bee Gees	November 1978	1	3	1 (United States, Canada, Europe)	See chart performance entry
"Trojan Horse"	Luv'	November 1978	n/a	n/a	1 (Netherlands, Belgium)	See chart performance entry
"Turn to Stone"	Electric Light Orchestra	November 1977	13	18	9 (Canada)	17 (New Zealand) – 42 (France)
"Two Out of Three Ain't Bad"	Meat Loaf	March 1978	11	32	5 (Canada)	See chart performance entry
"Use ta Be My Girl"	The O'Jays	March 1978	4	n/a	1 (United States)	15 (Canada Top Singles)
"Walk Right Back"	Anne Murray	January 1978	103	n/a	2 (Canada)	4 (US Billboard Hot Country Songs) – 3 (US Adult Contemporary)
"Werewolves of London"	Warren Zevon	January 1978	21	n/a	18 (Canada)	21 (US Billboard Hot 100) – 32 (Australia)
"Whenever I Call You "Friend""	Kenny Loggins	July 1978	5	n/a	3 (Canada)	5 (US Billboard Hot 100) – 40 (New Zealand)
"Who Are You"	The Who	July 1978	14	18	7 (Canada)	See chart performance entry
"Wild West Hero"	Electric Light Orchestra	May 1978	n/a	6	6 (United Kingdom, Ireland)	20 (Germany)
"Wonderful Tonight"	Eric Clapton	November 1977	16	n/a	2 (Netherlands)	15 (Canada) – 26 (New Zealand)
"Wuthering Heights"	Kate Bush	January 1978	n/a	1	1 (United Kingdom, Australia, New Zealand, Ireland)	See chart performance entry
"Y.M.C.A."	Village People	October 1978	2	1	1 (United Kingdom, Australia, Canada, Germany)	See chart performance entry
"You Belong to Me"	Carly Simon	April 1978	6	n/a	5 (Canada)	6 (US Billboard Hot 100) – 11 (US Cash Box Top 100)
"You Took the Words Right Out of My Mouth"	Meat Loaf	October 1977	39	33	2 (New Zealand)	See chart performance entry
"You're in My Heart (The Final Acclaim)"	Rod Stewart	October 1977	4	3	1 (Australia)	2 (Canada) – 2 (Ireland) – 2 (New Zealand)

=== Other Chart hit singles ===
- "Ain't Talkin' 'Bout Love" – Van Halen
- "All the Nice Boys and Girls in the World" – Riff Regan
- "Another Night on the Road" – Sherbet
- "Babylon's Burning" – The Ruts
- "Ça me fait rêver" – Dalida & Bruno Guillain
- "Can't Take the Hurt Anymore" – Cliff Richard
- "Chameleon Army" – Pink Lady
- "Charles (EP)" – The Skids
- "Clash City Rockers" – The Clash
- "Coming Home" – Marshall Hain
- "Damaged Goods (EP)" – Gang Of Four
- "Dance with Me" – Peter Brown
- "David Watts" – The Jam
- "The Day the World Turned Day-Glo" – X-Ray Spex
- "Deep in the Motherlode" – Genesis
- "Don't Cry for Me Argentina" – The Shadows
- "Down in the Tube Station at Midnight" – The Jam
- "Driver's Seat" – Sniff 'n' the Tears
- "Ever Fallen in Love (With Someone You Shouldn't've)" – Buzzcocks
- "Floral Dance" – Terry Wogan
- "Fly At Night" – Chilliwack
- "Génération 78" – Dalida & Bruno Guillain
- "Germfree Adolescents" – X-Ray Spex
- "Give Me Everything" – Magazine
- "Hong Kong Garden" – Siouxsie and the Banshees
- "I Don't Mind" – Buzzcocks
- "(I Don't Wanna Go to) Chelsea" – Elvis Costello and the Attractions
- "I See Red" – Split Enz
- "An Ideal for Living" – Joy Division
- "Identity" – X-Ray Spex
- "If the Kids Are United" – Sham 69
- "Jilted John" – Jilted John
- "Jocko Homo" – Devo
- "Khe Sanh" – Cold Chisel
- "Know Your Product" – The Saints
- "Le Lambeth Walk" – Dalida
- "Light Up Your Love" – Ronney Abramson
- "Love de Luxe" – The Shadows
- "Love You More" – Buzzcocks
- "Mammas Don't Let Your Babies Grow Up to Be Cowboys" – Waylon Jennings & Willie Nelson
- "Many Rivers to Cross" – Jimmy Cliff
- "Monster" – Pink Lady
- "Native New Yorker" – Odyssey
- "Never Say Die" – Black Sabbath
- "Nice 'n' Sleazy" – The Stranglers
- "Nobody's Scared" – Subway Sect
- "Northern Lights" – Renaissance
- "No Time To Be 21" – The Adverts
- "Only You Can Rock Me" – UFO (# 50 UK, # 31 US Billboard Mainstream Rock)
- "Please Remember Me" – Cliff Richard
- "Promises" – Buzzcocks
- "Public Image" – Public Image Limited
- "Radio Radio" – Elvis Costello and the Attractions
- "Ready Steady Go" – Generation X
- "Rising Free (EP)" – Tom Robinson Band
- "Rock Lobster" – The B-52's
- "Shot by Both Sides" – Magazine
- "Sign of the Times" – Bryan Ferry
- "Sing for the Day" – Styx
- "Southpaw" – Pink Lady
- "Still In Love with You" – Dragon (# 27 Australia, # 35 New Zealand)
- "Stuff Like That" – Quincy Jones
- "Suburban Boy" – Dave Warner's From the Suburbs
- "Surfin Bird" – The Cramps
- "Suspect Device" – Stiff Little Fingers
- "Take Me I'm Yours" – Squeeze (# 19 UK)
- "Teenage Kicks" – The Undertones
- "There's No Way Out of Here" – David Gilmour
- "Tommy Gun" – The Clash
- "Too Good to Be True" – Tom Robinson Band
- "Top of the Pops" – The Rezillos
- "Toumei Ningen" – Pink Lady
- "Twist à Saint-Tropez" – Telex
- "Uganda Stomp" – Battered Wives
- "United/Zyklon B Zombie" – Throbbing Gristle
- "Up Against the Wall" – Tom Robinson Band
- "Use ta Be My Girl" – O'Jays
- "Voilà pourquoi je chante" – Dalida
- "Walking In the Rain" – Cheetah
- "Warrior In Woolworth's" – X-Ray Spex
- "What a Waste" – Ian Dury & The Blockheads (# 9 UK)
- "What Do I Get?" – Buzzcocks
- "Where Were You?" – The Mekons
- "(White Man) In Hammersmith Palais" – The Clash
- "Who Does Lisa Like" – Rachel Sweet
- "Who Listens to the Radio" – The Sports (# 25 Australia, # 45 United States)
- "Wide Open (EP)" – The Skids
- "Women in Uniform" – Skyhooks (# 8 Australia, # 73 United Kingdom)
- "Yes, He Lives!" – Cliff Richard

== Notable singles ==
Song title	Artist(s)	Release date(s)	Other Chart Performance(s)
"Alternative Ulster"	Stiff Little Fingers	May 1978	n/a
"Ambition"	Subway Sect	November 1978	n/a
"Another Girl, Another Planet"	The Only Ones	April 1978	n/a
"Ever Fallen in Love (With Someone You Shouldn't've)"	Buzzcocks	September 1978	12 (UK Singles Chart)
"I Don't Mind"	Buzzcocks	April 1978	55 (UK Singles Chart)
"I See Red"	Split Enz	December 1978	began charting in 1979
"Know Your Product"	The Saints	February 1978	n/a
"Ready Steady Go"	Generation X	March 1978	47 (UK Singles Chart)
"Rock Lobster"	The B-52's	April 1978	Re-recorded version began charting in 1979
"Teenage Kicks"	The Undertones	October 1978	33 (UK Singles Chart)
"What Do I Get?"	Buzzcocks	February 1978	37 (UK Singles Chart)

=== Other Notable singles ===
- "Art-I-Ficial" – X-Ray Spex
- "Human Fly" – The Cramps
- "Lee Remick" – The Go-Betweens
- "Promises" – Buzzcocks
- "These Boots Are Made For Walking" – The Boys Next Door

== Published popular music ==
- "Another Suitcase in Another Hall" w. Tim Rice m. Andrew Lloyd Webber from the musical Evita
- "Dallas theme song" m. Jerrold Immel
- "Don't Cry for Me Argentina" w. Tim Rice m. Andrew Lloyd Webber from the musical Evita
- "Grease" w.m. Barry Gibb from the film Grease
- "Honesty" w.m. Billy Joel
- "Hopelessly Devoted to You" w.m. John Farrar introduced by Olivia Newton-John in the film Grease
- "My Life" w.m. Billy Joel
- "Only the Good Die Young" w.m. Billy Joel
- "Sultans of Swing" w.m. Mark Knopfler
- "Thank You for Being a Friend" w.m. Andrew Gold
- "Three Times a Lady" w.m. Lionel Richie
- "You Don't Bring Me Flowers" w. Alan Bergman, Marilyn Bergman & Neil Diamond m. Neil Diamond
- "You're the One That I Want" w.m. John Farrar introduced by Olivia Newton-John and John Travolta in the film Grease

== Classical music ==
- John Adams (composer)
  - Phrygian Gates, for piano
  - Shaker Loops, for string septet
- Malcolm Arnold – Symphony No. 8
- Peter Maxwell Davies – Salome, ballet in two acts
- Jacob Druckman – Viola Concerto
- Henri Dutilleux – Timbres, espace, mouvement
- Arvo Pärt – Spiegel im Spiegel
- Alexandre Rabinovitch-Barakovsky – Requiem pour une marée noire
- Steve Reich – Music for a Large Ensemble
- Iannis Xenakis – Mycènes Alpha

== Opera ==
- Robert Ashley – Perfect Lives
- Lorenzo Ferrero – Rimbaud, ou le fils du soleil
- Vivian Fine – The Women in the Garden
- György Ligeti – Le Grand Macabre
- Krzysztof Penderecki – Paradise Lost (libretto by Christopher Fry)
- Aulis Sallinen – The Red Line (Punainen viiva)

== Ballet ==
- Lorenzo Ferrero – Invito a nozze

== Musical theater ==
- Ain't Misbehavin' Broadway revue opened at the Longacre Theatre on May 9 and ran for 1604 performances
- The Best Little Whorehouse in Texas opened at the Entermedia Theatre on April 17 and ran for 85 performances. The show moved to Broadway in June 1978, and ran for 1584 performances.
- Eubie Broadway revue opened at the Ambassador Theatre on September 20 and ran for 439 performances
- Evita (Andrew Lloyd Webber and Tim Rice) – London production opened at the Prince Edward Theatre on June 21
- Hello, Dolly! (Jerry Herman) – Broadway revival opened at the Lunt-Fontanne Theatre on March 5 and ran for 152 performances
- I'm Getting My Act Together and Taking It on the Road Off-Broadway production opened at the Anspacher Theater on June 14 and ran for 1165 performances
- Timbuktu Broadway production opened at the Mark Hellinger Theatre on March 1 and ran for 243 performances
- On The Twentieth Century Broadway production opened at the St. James Theatre on February 19 and ran for 460 performances

== Musical films ==
- American Hot Wax
- The Buddy Holly Story
- Don
- FM
- Grease
- Heeralaal Pannalaal
- Rockers
- Sgt. Pepper's Lonely Hearts Club Band
- Thank God It's Friday
- The Wiz

== Births ==
- January 3
  - Kimberley Locke, American singer
  - Shawnna, American rapper and singer
- January 4 – Mai Meneses, Spanish singer-songwriter and guitarist
- January 5
  - Karnail Pitts, American rapper (d. 1999)
  - Emilia Rydberg, Swedish singer
- January 6 – Oksana Lyniv, Ukrainian conductor
- January 8 – Just Blaze, American record producer and disc jockey
- January 9
  - AJ McLean, American singer (Backstreet Boys)
  - Mashonda, American R&B singer
- January 12
  - Kris Roe, American rock guitarist and singer (The Ataris)
  - Jeremy Camp, American Christian guitarist and singer
- January 20 – Sid Wilson, American rock turntablist (Slipknot, DJ Starscream)
- January 21
  - Nokio the N-Tity, American singer-songwriter and producer (Dru Hill)
  - Phil Stacey, American singer
- January 22 – Issa Pointer, American singer (The Pointer Sisters)
- January 23 – E. Kidd Bogart, American music executive, television producer, music publisher and songwriter
- January 28 – Big Freedia, American rapper
- January 31 – Ibolya Oláh, Hungarian singer
- February 1
  - Jeff Conrad (Phantom Planet)
  - Tim Harding, Australian singer
- February 2 – Carly Binding, New Zealand pop singer (TrueBliss)
- February 3
  - Chae Ri-na, South Korean singer (Roo'ra, Diva, Girl Friends)
  - Joan Capdevila, Spanish footballer
- February 11 – Roc Marciano, American rapper and record producer (Flipmode Squad)
- February 12 – Brian Chase, American rock drummer (Yeah Yeah Yeahs)
- February 13 – Edsilia Rombley, Dutch singer and television presenter
- February 14 – Ryan Griffiths, guitarist (The Vines)
- February 19 – Immortal Technique Underground rapper
- February 22
  - Jenny Frost, British singer (Atomic Kitten)
  - Kim Kay, Belgian singer
- February 24 – John Nolan, American rock lead singer (Straylight Run)
- February 28 – Jeanne Cherhal, French singer-songwriter
- March 1 - Donovan Patton, American actor and television presenter
- March 4 – Giovanni Zarrella, German-Italian singer (Bro'Sis)
- March 5 – Papoose, American rapper (Flipmode Squad)
- March 10 – Benjamin Burnley, American musician
- March 12 – Claudio Sanchez, American singer/songwriter (Coheed & Cambria)
- March 12 – Mandaryna, Polish singer, dancer and actress
- March 14 – Moon Hee-joon, South Korean singer-songwriter
- March 19 – Lenka, Australian singer and actress
- March 21 – Kevin Federline, American performer and DJ (sometime married to Britney Spears, partner of Shar Jackson)
- March 21 – Rani Mukerji, Indian actress
- March 22 – Heinz Winckler, South African singer
- March 23 – Helena Josefsson, Swedish singer-songwriter
- March 25 – Plavka, German singer (Jam & Spoon)
- March 28 – Lina Hedlund, Swedish singer (Alcazar)
- March 30 – Simon Webbe, English boy band singer (Blue)
- March 31 – Tony Yayo, American rapper
- April 3 – Jillionaire, Trinidadian DJ and record producer (Major Lazer)
- April 4 – Lemar, English singer-songwriter and record producer
- April 6
  - Myleene Klass, English singer (Hear'Say), pianist, media personality and model
  - Chun Myung-hoon, South Korean boy band singer (NRG)
- April 7 – Duncan James, English boy band singer (Blue)
- April 9 – Rachel Stevens, English singer-songwriter, actress, television presenter, model and businesswoman (S Club 7)
- April 11 – Thomas Thacker, Canadian singer
- April 12 – Guy Berryman, Scottish rock bass player (Coldplay)
- April 13 – Chris Sligh, American singer
- April 14 – Louisy Joseph, French singer
- April 15 – Chris Stapleton, American country musician
- April 15 – Luis Fonsi, Puerto Rican singer
- April 16
  - Jody Marie Gnant, American singer-songwriter and pianist
  - Duane Betts, American guitarist and singer-songwriter (The Allman Betts Band)
- April 21
  - Jukka Nevalainen, Finnish drummer (Nightwish)
  - Branden Steineckert (The Used, Rancid)
- April 22 – Jason Stollsteimer, American lead singer and guitarist (The Von Bondies)
- April 28 – Ben Bridwell, American singer (Band of Horses)
- April 28 – Lauren Laverne, English rock singer (Kenickie)
- May 3 – Paul Banks, American rock vocalist (Interpol)
- May 6 – Nick Littlemore, Australian musician, record producer and singer-songwriter
- May 8 – Jang Woo-hyuk, South Korean singer and rapper (H.O.T.)
- May 10 – MC Ride, American rapper, songwriter and visual artist (Death Grips)
- May 12
  - Wilfred Le Bouthillier, Canadian singer
  - Elzhi, American rapper (Slum Village)
- May 21 – Adam Gontier, Canadian-born rock musician (Three Days Grace)
- May 22 – Katie Price, English media personality, model, singer, author and businesswoman
- May 23
  - Phil Elverum, American musician, songwriter, record producer and visual artist, best known for his musical projects The Microphones and Mount Eerie (married to Michelle Williams, Geneviève Castrée)
  - Scott Raynor, American rock musician (Blink-182)
- May 25 – Adam Gontier, Canadian singer-songwriter and musician (Three Days Grace, Saints Asonia)
- May 29
  - Adam Rickitt, British actor, singer and model
  - Daniel Pearce, English boy band singer (One True Voice)
- May 30 – Kianna Alarid, American indie rock singer and bass guitarist (Tilly and the Wall)
- May 31 – Alex, Danish singer and songwriter
- June 1 – Ben Lummis, New Zealand singer
- June 6
  - Carl Barât, English rock singer and guitarist (The Libertines, Dirty Pretty Things)
  - Joy Enriquez, American singer and actress
  - Eun Ji-won, South Korean rapper (Sechs Kies)
- June 7 – Tony Ahn, South Korean singer
- June 9 – Matt Bellamy, English musician, singer-songwriter (Muse)
- June 10 – Shane West, American actor, punk rock musician and songwriter
- June 13 – Jason Michael Carroll, American country musician
- June 18 - Kathleen Aerts, Belgian singer (K3)
- June 19
  - Mía Maestro, Argentine actress and singer-songwriter
  - Glennis Grace, Dutch singer
- June 24
  - Ariel Pink, American singer-songwriter, musician, producer (Atheif)
  - Emppu Vuorinen, Finnish guitarist and songwriter (Nightwish, Brother Firetribe, Altaria, Barilari)
- June 25 – Chuckie, Surinamese DJ and producer
- June 27
  - Petra Frey, Austrian singer
  - Lolly, English singer
- June 29
  - Sam Farrar (Phantom Planet)
  - Nicole Scherzinger, American recording artist, television personality and performer (The Pussycat Dolls)
- June 30 – Miriam Christine, Maltese pop R&B singer
- July 4 – Stephen McNally, English singer-songwriter (BBMak)
- July 7 – DJ Manian, German DJ and music producer (Cascada)
- July 9
  - Sundance Head, American singer
  - Younglord, American record producer and singer
- July 10
  - Ray Kay, Norwegian director, music video director and photographer
  - Jesse Lacey, singer/musician (Brand New, Taking Back Sunday)
- July 16 – T. J. Jackson, American singer (3T)
- July 17
  - Panda Bear, American singer-songwriter and keyboard player (Animal Collective, Jane)
  - Trevor McNevan, Canadian singer-songwriter (Thousand Foot Krutch, FM Static)
  - Émilie Simon, French singer-songwriter
- July 18 – Annie Mac, Irish-born DJ and broadcast presenter
- July 20
  - Elliott Yamin, American singer
  - Linda Mertens, Belgian singer (Milk Inc.)
- July 21 – Damian Marley, Jamaican singer-songwriter and producer
- July 22 – Maíra Charken, Dutch-Brazilian actress, singer, dancer, television host and comedian
- July 23 – Stefanie Sun, Singaporean singer-songwriter
- July 31 – Will Champion, English rock drummer (Coldplay)
- August 1 – Dhani Harrison, English musician and son of George Harrison of The Beatles
- August 6 – Andreas Öberg, Swedish guitarist, songwriter and producer (Eurovision, Taeyeon, Red Velvet, EXO, NCT)
- August 7
  - Jamey Jasta, American rock singer (Hatebreed)
  - Justin Young (singer, born 1978), American Hawaiian singer-songwriter, musician (Gone West) (sometime personal and professional partner of Colbie Caillat)
- August 8 – Gary Nichols, American country music singer
- August 15
  - Tim Foreman, American rock bassist (Switchfoot)
  - Waleed Aly, Australian lawyer, activist, academic, journalist, comedian, musician and television host
- August 18 – Andy Samberg, American actor, comedian, filmmaker and musician, member of The Lonely Island and spouse of Joanna Newsom
- August 22 – James Corden, English actor, writer, producer, comedian, television host and singer
- August 23
  - Julian Casablancas, American indie rock singer-songwriter and record producer (The Strokes)
  - Kobe Bryant, American basketball player (d. 2020)
- August 28
  - Max Collins, American alternative rock singer-songwriter (Eve 6)
  - Jess Margera, American drummer (CKY)
- August 30 – Sinead Kerr, Scottish ice dancer
- September 4 – Blair Joscelyne, Australian composer, musician, producer and filmmaker
- September 5 – Lina Santiago, American singer
- September 6
  - Cisco Adler, American musician
  - Foxy Brown, American rapper
- September 9 – Johnny Shentall, English singer
- September 11 – Ben Lee, Australian singer
- September 12 – Ruben Studdard, American singer
- September 13 – Swiss Beatz, American rapper and record producer (married to Alicia Keys)
- September 14 – Teddy Park, South Korean rapper, songwriter and record producer (1TYM)
- September 15 – Charles Grigsby, American singer
- September 16 – Matthew Rogers, American country singer
- September 18 – Lu Andrade, Brazilian singer-songwriter and actress
- September 20
  - Patrizio Buanne, Italian singer
  - Sarit Hadad, Israeli pop singer
  - DJ White Shadow, American music producer and DJ (Lady Gaga)
- September 24 – Jack Dishel, Russian-American musician, actor, writer, director, comic and producer (married to Regina Spektor)
- September 25 – Ryan Leslie, American R&B singer
- September 28 – Nikki McKibbin, American singer (d. 2020)
- September 29 – Kurt Nilsen, Norwegian pop country singer, winner of World Idol
- September 30 – Steve Klein, American rock musician (New Found Glory)
- October 2 – Ayumi Hamasaki, Japanese singer
- October 3 – Jake Shears, American singer
- October 5 – James Valentine, American musician
- October 7
  - Alison Balsom, English classical trumpeter (married to Sam Mendes)
  - Alesha Dixon, English singer (Mis-Teeq)
- October 9
  - Nicky Byrne, Irish boy band singer (Westlife)
  - Rossa, Indonesian singer
- October 14 – Usher, American singer, dancer and actor
- October 20
  - Kira, German singer
  - Michael Johns, Australian singer (d. 2014)
  - Venke Knutson, Norwegian singer and songwriter
- October 22 – Ed Droste. American singer-songwriter and musician,
- October 25 – Masta Wu, South Korean rapper, songwriter and producer
- October 27 – Vanessa-Mae, British violinist
- October 27 – Sabrina Washington, English singer (Mis-Teeq)
- October 28 – Justin Guarini, American singer
- October 30 – Kris Moyes, Australian producer and director
- November 5 – Michalis Hatzigiannis, Greek Cyprot singer
- November 6 – Taryn Manning, American actress, singer-songwriter and fashion designer (Boomkat)
- November 7 – Mark Read, British -Norwegian singer (A1)
- November 8 – Shyne, Belizean politician and rapper
- November 9 – Sisqó, American singer
- November 10
  - Eve, American rapper
  - Diplo, American DJ and record producer (Major Lazer)
- November 11 – Aaron Bruno, American singer-songwriter, musician and multi-instrumentalist (Awolnation, Under the Influence of Giants, Home Town Hero)
- November 13
  - Joanne Accom, Australian singer-songwriter
  - Nikolai Fraiture, American rock bassist (The Strokes)
- November 16 – Carolina Parra, Brazilian indie-electro guitarist and drummer (Cansei de Ser Sexy)
- November 18 – Andris Nelsons, Latvian conductor
- November 19 – Lil' Mo, American singer-songwriter
- November 22 – Karen O, South Korean-born American singer-songwriter, musician and record producer (Yeah Yeah Yeahs)
- November 23 – Alison Mosshart, American singer-songwriter and artist, lead vocalist of The Kills and The Dead Weather
- November 25 – Shiina Ringo, Japanese singer and musician
- November 27 – Mike Skinner, English rapper, singer, musician and record producer (The Streets)
- November 30
  - Clay Aiken, American singer
  - Gael García Bernal, Mexican film actor, director, singer, musician, model and producer
- December 1 – Mat Kearney, American musician
- December 2
  - Nelly Furtado, Canadian/Portuguese singer-songwriter, record producer and instrumentalist
  - Chris Wolstenholme, English alternative rock bass guitarist ((Muse))
- December 5 – David Hodges, American songwriter and producer (Evanescence)
- December 9, – Jesse Metcalfe, American singer and actor
- December 13 – laza Morgan, Jamaican-American singer and rapper
- December 14 – Radu Sîrbu, Moldovan singer (O-Zone)
- December 15
  - Coffey Anderson, American singer
  - Ned Brower, American rock drummer (Rooney)
  - Mark Jansen, Dutch guitarist, vocalist and songwriter (After Forever, Epica, MaYaN)
- December 18 – Lindsay Armaou, Irish singer (B*Witched)
- December 20 – Yoon Kye-sang, South Korean actor and singer (g.o.d)
- December 21
  - Maya Jupiter, Mexican/Turkish Australian rapper, songwriter, MC and radio personality
  - Shaun Morgan, South African singer-songwriter, musician, guitarist (Seether)
- December 22
  - Mia Tyler, American actress and model (daughter of Steven Tyler )
  - Danny Ahn, South Korean-American rapper (g.o.d)
- December 23 – Esthero, Canadian singer-songwriter
- December 24 – Tonedeff, American rapper
- December 28
  - John Legend, American singer-songwriter, actor, musician and actor
  - Phonte, American rapper
- December 29
  - Steve Kemp, British musician (Hard-Fi)
  - LaToya London, American R&B and soul singer
- December 30 – Tyrese Gibson, American R&B singer and actor

== Deaths ==
- January 3 – Jack Oakie, 74, actor in many musical films of the 1940s
- January 23
  - Terry Kath, 31, Chicago guitarist and vocalist (unintentional self-inflicted gunshot )
  - Vic Ames, 52, pop singer (Ames Brothers)
- January 31 – Gregory Herbert, Blood, Sweat & Tears saxophonist
- February 7 – Dimitrie Cuclin, 82, composer and musicologist
- February 24 – Mrs Mills, 59, honky-tonk pianist
- March 4 – Joe Marsala, 71, clarinetist and songwriter
- March 10 – Sofia Vembo, 68, Greek singer and actress
- March 11 – Claude François, 39, singer-songwriter (electrocuted)
- March 17 – Malvina Reynolds, 77, US folk/blues singer-songwriter
- March 18 – Peggy Wood, 86, actress and singer
- March 21 – Louis Cottrell, Jr., 67, saxophonist and clarinet player (b. 1911)
- April 3 – Ray Noble, 74, composer and bandleader
- April 21 – Sandy Denny, 31, folk singer (Fairport Convention) (cerebral haemorrhage)
- May 1 – Aram Khachaturian, 74, composer
- May 5 – Ján Móry, 85, Slovak composer
- May 26 – Tamara Karsavina, 93, ballerina
- July 14 – Maria Grinberg, 69, pianist
- July 29 – Glenn Goins, 24, Parliament Funkadelic guitarist and singer (Hodgkin's lymphoma)
- August 1 – Rudolf Kolisch, 82, Viennese and American violinist and quartet leader
- August 14 – Joe Venuti, 74, US jazz violinist
- August 24 – Louis Prima, 67, jazz musician
- September 6 – Tom Wilson, 47, producer
- September 7 – Keith Moon, 32, drummer of The Who (drug overdose)
- September 24 – Ruth Etting, 80, US "torch" singer
- October 6 – Johnny O'Keefe, 43, Australian singer
- October 9 – Jacques Brel, 49, singer-songwriter
- October 12 – Nancy Spungen, 20, girlfriend of Sid Vicious
- October 23 – Maybelle Carter née Addington, 69, US country singer and musician, member of the Carter Family
- November 12 – Howard Swanson, 71, composer
- November 18 – Lennie Tristano, 59, jazz pianist
- December 3 – William Grant Still, 83, composer
- December 27 – Chris Bell, 27, singer-songwriter (auto accident)

== Awards ==
- 19th Annual Grammy Awards
- 1978 Country Music Association Awards
- Eurovision Song Contest 1978
- 20th Japan Record Awards
