= Blinded by the Light: The Very Best of Manfred Mann's Earth Band =

Blinded by the Light: The Very Best Of Manfred Mann's Earth Band

Compilation album by Manfred Mann's Earth Band
- Released: 1992
- Genre: Rock
- Length: 1:16:51
- Label: Arcade Records
- Producer: Manfred Mann

Manfred Mann's Earth Band chronology
Spotlight: 1971–1991 (1992)	Blinded by the Light: The Very Best Of Manfred Mann's Earth Band (1992)	The Very Best of Manfred Mann's Earth Band, Vol. 2 (1993)

Blinded by the Light: The Very Best of Manfred Mann's Earth Band is the fourth compilation album by British rock band Manfred Mann's Earth Band, released in 1992.

== Track listing ==
No.	Title	Writer(s)	Length
1.	"Blinded by the Light"	Bruce Springsteen	7:05
2.	"Questions"	Manfred Mann, Chris Slade	3:57
3.	"Davy's on the Road Again"	John Simon, Robbie Robertson	3:38
4.	"For You"	Bruce Springsteen	5:40
5.	"California"	Sue Vickers	5:27
6.	"The Mighty Quinn"	Bob Dylan	6:19
7.	"Somewhere in Africa" (Arranged By – Manfred Mann, John Lingwood)	Traditional	1:36
8.	"The Runner"	Ian Thomas	4:38
9.	"Lies (Through The Eighties)"	Danny Newman	4:35
10.	"Joybringer"	Manfred Mann, Chris Slade, Mick Rogers	3:26
11.	"Demolition Man"	Sting	3:45
12.	"You Angel You"	Bob Dylan	4:01
13.	"Don't Kill It Carol"	Mike Heron	6:13
14.	"Spirits in the Night"	Bruce Springsteen	6:28
15.	"Angels at my Gate"	Manfred Mann, Hirth Martinez, Jimme O'Neill	4:49
16.	"Third World Service"	Anthony Moore	5:14
Total length:			01:16:51

== Personnel ==
- Manfred Mann – keyboards, backing vocals
- Colin Pattenden – bass
- Dave Flett – lead guitar
- Chris Hamlet Thompson – lead vocals, rhythm guitar
- Chris Slade – drums, backing vocals, percussion
- Mick Rogers – guitars, vocals

== Charts ==
Chart (1994)	Peak position
Dutch Albums (Album Top 100)	77
German Albums (Offizielle Top 100)	10
Norwegian Albums (VG-lista)	1
Scottish Albums (OCC)	88
Swedish Albums (Sverigetopplistan)	37
Swiss Albums (Schweizer Hitparade)	15
UK Albums (OCC)	69

== Certifications ==
Region	Certification	Certified units/sales
Germany (BVMI)	Gold	250,000^{^}
^{^} Shipments figures based on certification alone.
