= Track record =

Track record is a term from racing, referring to the past performance of a person (or animal), organization, or product. It may also refer to:

- Track record (horse racing)
- Track Record (Joan Armatrading album), a 1983 compilation album by Joan Armatrading
- Track Record (Sherbet album), a 1979 compilation album by Sherbet
- The Track Record, an American pop punk band of the 2000s
- Track Records, an English record label

== See also ==
- Record track
- United States records in track and field
- List of world records in athletics
