= Op. 124 =

In music, Op. 124 stands for Opus number 124. Compositions that are assigned this number include:

- Arnold – Symphony No. 8
- Beethoven – The Consecration of the House
- Reger – An die Hoffnung
- Schumann – Albumblätter
