= Hej, mitt vinterland =

Song by Lena Conradson

from the album Banjo Boy
- Released: 1960
- Songwriter: Britt Lindeborg

"Hej, mitt vinterland" is a song written by Britt Lindeborg. While not mentioning any holiday, the song is generally associated with Christmas. The song was recorded by Lena Conradson on her 1960 EP Banjo Boy.

The song was also recorded by Agnetha Fältskog and Linda Ulvaeus (1981), a recording that on 13 December 1981 chartered at Svensktoppen for one week reaching the eight position. It was also recorded by Renée Agén, Carola Häggkvist (1983), Samuelsons (1979), Vikingarna (1975), Lotta Engberg (1992), Wizex (1993), Magnus Carlsson (2001), Sanna Nielsen (2001) and Amy Diamond (2008).
