= Track Record (Sherbet album) =

Compilation album by Sherbet
- Released: August 1979
- Genre: Rock, pop
- Length: 47:15
- Label: Festival
- Producer: Jay Lewis, Richard Lush, Sherbet, Garth Porter, Harvey James, Tony Mitchell

Sherbet chronology
Sherbet (1978)	Track Record (1979)	The Skill (1980)

Singles from Track Record
- 1. "Angela" Released: March 1979; 2. "Heart Get Ready" Released: 1979

Track Record is a third compilation album by Australian band, Sherbet. It was released in August 1979.

== Track listing ==
Side A
No.	Title	Writer(s)	Album	Length
1.	"Heart Get Ready"	Garth Porter, Tony Mitchell, Harvey James	Track Record	3:24
2.	"Midsummer Madness"	Porter, Mitchell, James	Photoplay	3:26
3.	"Another Night On the Road"	Porter, Mitchell, Roger Davies, Jon Wood	Sherbet	3:59
4.	"Safe Water" (Live)	Porter, Mitchell, Nick Graham	B-Side of "(Feels Like) It's Slippin' Away"	3:19
5.	"High Rollin'" (Live)	Porter, Mitchell	Caught in the Act... Live	3:08
6.	"Skyline" (Recorded live during the Another Night on the Road tour)	Porter, James	non-album bonus track	3:47
7.	"Gimme Some Lovin'" (Recorded live during the Another Night on the Road tour)	Steve Winwood, Spencer Davis, Muff Winwood	non-album bonus track	3:39

Side B
No.	Title	Writer(s)	Album	Length
1.	"(Feels Like It's) Slippin' Away"	Porter, Morgan	Sherbet	3:29
2.	"Angela"	Porter, James	Track Record	3:37
3.	"Take My Heart"	Porter, Mitchell, Alan Sandow	Sherbet	3:28
4.	"You Made a Fool" (single version)	Porter, Tom Seufert	Sherbet	3:20
5.	"Nowhere Man" (Live)	John Lennon, Paul McCartney	Caught in the Act... Live	2:37
6.	"Magazine Madonna"	Mitchell	Photoplay	4:07
7.	"Still in Love With You"	Daryl Braithwaite	Photoplay	4:35
Total length:				47:15

== Chart positions ==
Chart (1979)	Peak Position
Australia (Kent Music Report)	79

== Personnel ==
- Bass, vocals – Tony Mitchell
- Drums – Alan Sandow
- Guitar, vocals – Harvey James
- Keyboards, vocals – Garth Porter
- Lead vocals – Daryl Braithwaite

== Release history ==
Country	Date	Label	Format	Catalog
Australia	August 1979	Festival	LP, Cassette	L 368218
