= Rematch (disambiguation) =

Rematch is a Sammy Hagar compilation album.

Rematch may also refer to:

- Replay (sports)
- REMATCH (Randomized Evaluation of Mechanical Assistance for the Treatment of Congestive Heart Failure), a clinical trial for a ventricular assist device
- Re:Match, a 1982 album by Armageddon Dildos
- "Rematch", a 2000 song by Dave Angel and Darren Emerson
- "Rematch", a 2018 song by musical duo MXM
- Rematch, a 2025 football based video game.

== See also ==
- Riddim Driven: Rematch, a 2002 installment of VP Records' Riddim Driven series
