= Pat King =

British musician (1944–2022)

Patrick John King (1944 – 25 January 2022) also known as Speedy King, was a Scottish bassist, best known for his association with Manfred Mann's Earth Band.

== History ==
King was born in Aberdeen in 1944 and raised in Fraserburgh, Scotland.

After attending Art College for a few years he turned his attention to music and played in several local bands in Aberdeen before moving to London. He played briefly with The Luvvers, the former Lulu backing group before eventually joining a band called Trifle, which at one time became Lulu's backing group on occasion. After a stint as a croupier at the London Playboy club, King, between 1975 & 1976, joined a band called Shanghai, (which released two albums, in 1974 and 1976), which included Mick Green, Cliff Bennett, Pete Kircher and Brian Alterman. King worked as a session musician, including on the early releases of Billy Ocean: "Love Really Hurts Without You", "Red Light Spells Danger", "L.O.D. ( Love on Delivery )" and others.

King was the bass guitar player for Manfred Mann's Earth Band between 1977 and 1982. King replaced founding member Colin Pattenden, who left the band in 1977. He worked on the albums Watch, Angel Station and Chance.

Although leaving the band in 1982, King retained close ties. From 1991 to 2013, he was the band's lighting designer, until retiring to Olvera, Andalucía in December 2013.

King devoted much of his time to photography and playing in a chirigota group – Los Mochuelos – as well as DJ in a local rap band – El Clan del Sur. He became part of a duo – Pete and Peto (his Spanish nickname, which means dungarees, for an obvious reason) playing blues and rock standards.

== Death ==
King died on 25 January 2022, from an illness.
