= Dave Flett =

Scottish guitarist

- Born: David Flett; Aberdeen, Scotland
- Genres: Rock, progressive rock
- Occupations: Musician, singer-songwriter
- Instrument: Guitar
- Years active: 1970–present
- Website: Official Dave Flett website

David Flett is a Scottish rock guitarist, best known for performing with Manfred Mann's Earth Band and Thin Lizzy.

== Career ==
=== Early years and Manfred Mann ===
Flett began his career with local groups in Aberdeen such as Cat Squirrel, Once Upon a Band and Pinto. He later moved to London and joined an all-Aberdeen group called Jock. While he was living in London, he was recommended to Manfred Mann and subsequently joined Manfred Mann's Earth Band, with whom he made his debut on their 1975 autumn tour of America. He performed on two Earth Band studio albums, The Roaring Silence and Watch, which featured two hit singles in "Blinded by the Light" and "Davy's on the Road Again" respectively.

=== Thin Lizzy ===
After leaving Manfred Mann's Earth Band in 1979, he briefly toured as a temporary member of Thin Lizzy after Gary Moore left the group following a concert on 4 July 1979. After Midge Ure initially replaced Moore, Flett was recruited in early September 1979 as lead guitarist alongside Scott Gorham for a tour of Japan, while Ure switched to keyboards. Playing his first show with Thin Lizzy in Osaka on 24 September, Flett performed at five shows before the band returned home. During this tour, he and the band performed a number of songs that later surfaced on the Chinatown album the following year, such as "Didn't I" and "Sweetheart". In December he played a few Thin Lizzy shows that were arranged to compensate for missing the Reading Festival earlier in the year, and he left the group shortly before Christmas. He had wanted to remain with Thin Lizzy, but instead Snowy White was chosen as his permanent replacement, who went on to record two albums with the band. Flett described his short tenure with Thin Lizzy as "Great times with extremely talented, generous guys."

After leaving Thin Lizzy, Flett formed a short lived band called Special Branch, with Matt Irving. On 11 August 1981, Flett joined Thin Lizzy onstage at a concert in his hometown of Aberdeen, as part of the Renegade tour. He said, "I did guest on a few numbers with them... [it] showed there were no hard feelings."

== Later life ==
Flett is an addictions counselor in central Florida, and in 2004, spoke out to prove his identity amid false stories spread by a man impersonating him.
