= Musical Chairs (Sammy Hagar album) =

Studio album by Sammy Hagar
- Released: October 10, 1977
- Recorded: 1977
- Studio: Utopia (London)
- Genre: Rock
- Length: 34:35
- Label: Capitol
- Producer: John Carter

Sammy Hagar chronology
Sammy Hagar (1977)	Musical Chairs (1977)	All Night Long (1978)

Professional ratings
Review scores
Source	Rating
AllMusic	3.5/5 stars

Musical Chairs is the third studio album by American rock vocalist Sammy Hagar, released in October 1977 by Capitol Records. The lineup features three quarters of the classic Montrose lineup, sans Ronnie Montrose (and the only full album by Sammy Hagar to do so). The album peaked at No. 100 on the Billboard 200.

== Song information ==
"Try (Try to Fall in Love)" was originally released as a single by its writer's stage moniker of Cooker.

== Track listing ==
All tracks are written by Sammy Hagar, except where noted.

Side one
No.	Title	Writer(s)	Length
1.	"Turn Up the Music"	John Carter; Sammy Hagar	3:35
2.	"It's Gonna Be All Right"		4:11
3.	"You Make Me Crazy"		2:47
4.	"Reckless"		3:32
5.	"Try (Try to Fall in Love)" (Cooker cover)	Norman Des Rosiers	3:11

Side two
No.	Title	Writer(s)	Length
6.	"Don't Stop Me Now"	Carter; Hagar	3:12
7.	"Straight from the Hip Kid" (Liar cover)	Norman Tager; Paul Travis	3:09
8.	"Hey Boys"		2:50
9.	"Someone Out There"		3:01
10.	"Crack in the World"		5:11
Total length:			34:35

Reissue bonus track
No.	Title	Writer(s)	Length
11.	"(Sittin' On) The Dock of the Bay" (Otis Redding cover)	Otis Redding; Steve Cropper	3:03

- The 1996 One Way Records re-release of the album includes this bonus track, which Hagar released as a single in 1979 and did not appear on CD until The Best of Sammy Hagar compilation album in 1992.

== Personnel ==
- Sammy Hagar – lead vocals, guitar
- Denny Carmassi – drums
- Bill Church – bass guitar
- Alan Fitzgerald – keyboards
- Gary Pihl – guitar

=== Production ===
- John Carter – producer
- Warren Dewey – engineer
- Paul Grupp – additional recording
- Andrew Powell – string arrangement
- Hipgnosis – package design

== Singles ==
"You Make Me Crazy" b/w "Reckless" (Capitol US 4502)
"You Make Me Crazy" b/w "Hey Boys" (Capitol Spain 006-085.367)
"You Make Me Crazy" b/w "Reckless" (Capitol Holland 5C 006-85350)
"Turn Up the Music" b/w "Hey Boys" (Capitol 4550)

== Releases ==
- Capitol (US) SN-16051
- Capitol (UK) GO 2021
- Capitol (US) CDP 7 48434 2
- BGO Records (1994 UK reissue) BGOCD201
- One Way Records (1996 US Reissue) 72438 19091 26
- Capitol (1996 Japan reissue) TOCP-8343
