= 1978 in Nordic music =

The following is a list of notable events and releases that happened in Nordic music in 1978.

== Events ==
- 12 April – György Ligeti's opera, Le Grand Macabre, receives its world première in Stockholm, in Swedish translation.
- 15 April – Ulf Grahn's The Wind of Dawn for orchestra and tape is premièred by the Northern Virginia Symphony in the United States, five years after its composition.
- 22 April – At the 23rd Eurovision Song Contest, Sweden, in 14th place, is the best performing of the Scandinavian countries. Denmark finish 16th and Finland 18th. Norway finish 20th (bottom) with no points, after an eccentric performance by Jahn Teigen, whose song went on to be a huge success in the charts.
- unknown date – Sweden's Göran Söllscher wins the Concours International de Guitare in Paris.

== New works ==
- Vagn Holmboe
  - Brass Quintet No. 2
  - String Quartet No. 15
- Aulis Sallinen – The Red Line (opera)

== Hit singles ==
- ABBA
  - "Summer Night City" (#1 Ireland, Sweden)
  - "Take a Chance on Me" (#1 Austria, Belgium, Ireland, UK)
- Eppu Normaali – "Jee jee" (#18 Finland)
- Leevi and the Leavings – "Mitä kuuluu, Marja-Leena?"
- Prima Vera – "Så lykkelig i Sverige"
- Shu-bi-dua – "Danmark"
- Björn Skifs – "Det blir alltid värre framåt natten" (#8 Sweden)
- Jahn Teigen – "Mil etter mil" (#1 Norway)

== Hit albums ==
- Tomas Ledin – Fasten Seatbelts (#8 Sweden)
- Sebastian – Sebastian i Montmartre
- Samuelsons – Vilken dag!
- Jahn Teigen – This Year's Loser

== Film music ==
- Fuzzy – Honning Måne
- Sebastian – Du er ikke alene

== Births ==
- 19 January – Laura Närhi, Finnish pop singer
- 28 February – Mikko Innanen, Finnish saxophonist and composer
- 28 March – Vilhjálmur Vilhjálmsson, Icelandic singer (born 1945)
- 11 May – Perttu Kivilaakso, Finnish cello player
- 6 December – Benjamin Staern, Swedish composer

== Deaths ==
- 13 February – Aslak Brekke, Norwegian folk singer (born 1901)
- 23 March – Greta Dahlström, Finnish composer and teacher (born 1887)
- 20 May – Bjarne Brustad, Norwegian violinist, violist and composer (born 1895)
- 8 June – Jenny Hasselquist, Swedish ballerina (born 1894)

== See also ==
- 1978 in Denmark
- 1978 in Finland
- 1978 in Iceland
- 1978 in Norwegian music
- 1978 in Sweden
