= You Make Me Crazy =

Single by Sammy Hagar

from the album Musical Chairs
- B-side: "Reckless"
- Released: October 1977
- Recorded: 1977
- Genre: Soft rock
- Length: 2:47 (album version); 2:25 (single edit)
- Label: Capitol
- Songwriter: Sammy Hagar
- Producer: John S. Carter

Sammy Hagar singles chronology
| "Filmore Shuffle" (1977) | "You Make Me Crazy" (1977) | "Turn Up the Music" (1978) |

"You Make Me Crazy" is a song by American singer-songwriter Sammy Hagar. It was released as the lead single from his third studio album, Musical Chairs. The song features Hagar and his Montrose bandmates such as Denny Carmassi, Bill Church, and Alan Fitzgerald. The latter bandmate later became a touring musician for Van Halen in the early 1990s while Hagar was the lead singer for the band.

It peaked at No. 62 on the Billboard Hot 100, making it his first charting single.

== Reception ==
Billboard described “You Make Me Crazy” as Sammy Hagar's first single from his new LP, noting it as a mellow, mid-tempo love ballad built around a catchy keyboard riff. Subtle handclaps appear throughout the track, supporting its soft instrumentation, while the laid-back atmosphere is carried effectively by Hagar's relaxed, easygoing vocal delivery.

== Personnel ==
- Sammy Hagar – vocals, guitar
- Denny Carmassi – drums
- Bill Church – bass guitar
- Alan Fitzgerald – keyboards
- Gary Pihl – guitar

== Charts ==
| Chart (1978) | Peak position |
|---|---|
| Canada Top Singles (RPM) | 84 |
| US Billboard Hot 100 | 62 |
