= Rematch =

Compilation album by Sammy Hagar
- Released: 1982
- Recorded: 1976–1980
- Genre: Classic Rock
- Length: 56:31
- Label: Capitol
- Producer: Carter

Sammy Hagar chronology
Rematch	Cruisin' & Boozin'

Professional ratings
Review scores
Source	Rating
Allmusic	4/5 stars

Rematch is the first US-released Sammy Hagar compilation album. After Sammy left Capitol Records for Geffen in 1981, and after Rick Springfield had a hit with the Hagar-penned "I've Done Everything for You", this collection was released to capitalize on that momentum.

The album was originally released as a 10-track LP, but in 1987, Capitol re-released the collection on CD as "Rematch And More", adding five more tracks from the Capitol albums.

== Song information ==
- Rematch marks the first LP release of the studio version of "I've Done Everything For You". The song was originally recorded live and released on the album All Night Long. In 1979, the studio track was released as a b-side to Sammy's single of a cover of "(Sittin' On) The Dock of the Bay".
- All the tracks are taken from Sammy's five Capitol studio albums except for the aforementioned "I've Done Everything For You" and "Bad Motor Scooter", which is the live version found on All Night Long.

== Track listing ==
1. "Red" (Carter/Hagar)
2. "I've Done Everything for You" (Hagar)
3. "Rock 'N' Roll Weekend" (Hagar)
4. "Cruisin' & Boozin'" (Hagar)
5. "Turn Up the Music" (Carter/Hagar)
6. "Keep On Rockin'" (Carter, Hagar) *
7. "Fillmore Shuffle" (Stephens) *
8. "Reckless" (Hagar) *
9. "Don't Stop Me Now" (Carter/Hagar) *
10. "Trans Am (Highway Wonderland)" (Hagar)
11. "Love Or Money" (Sammy Hagar)
12. "This Planet's on Fire (Burn in Hell)" (Hagar)
13. "Plain Jane" (Hagar)
14. "Bad Reputation" (Sammy Hagar)
15. "Bad Motor Scooter" (Hagar) *
- Additional songs included on "Rematch and More" marked by asterisks

== Cover art ==
The cover depicts a mock-up of a supposed boxing match poster advertisement. This represents Sammy's own early career aspirations to follow in his father's footsteps as professional prize fighter. The "main event" in this ad is between Sammy and a fighter named "Roy Scarlet"; a euphemism using Sammy's actual middle name, Roy, and "Scarlet" which would be the equivalent of "Red" for Sammy's "Red Rocker" moniker.

A second billing is also depicted on the poster, John "Little Red" Galt vs. Bill Church. While Bill Church was clearly the long-time bassist in Sammy's band, it is unclear whether or not John Galt refers to the Atlas Shrugged character.

== Personnel ==
=== Band ===
- Sammy Hagar: Vocals and Guitar
- Bill Church: Bass
- Gary Pihl: Guitar and Keyboards
- Alan Fitzgerald: Keyboards
- Geoff Workman: Keyboards
- Chuck Ruff: Drums
- Denny Carmassi: Drums

=== Guests ===
- Neal Schon: Guitar solos on "Love or Money"

=== Other Personnel ===
- Randall Scott Davis: Compact Disc Compilation
- Dave Frazer: Engineer Assistant
- Tom Scholz: Inspiration, pre-production arrangements and drum recordings
- Geoff Workman: Engineer

== Versions ==
- Capitol (US) : ST-12238
- Capitol (US) : SN-16336
- Capitol (US) : CDP 7 46471 2 (as "Rematch And More")
