= Watch (Manfred Mann's Earth Band album) =

Studio album by Manfred Mann's Earth Band
- Released: 24 February 1978
- Recorded: 1977
- Studios: Workhouse, Old Kent Road, London
- Genres: Rock; hard rock; progressive rock
- Length: 39:26
- Labels: Bronze (UK); Warner Bros. (U.S.)
- Producers: Manfred Mann, Earth Band

Manfred Mann's Earth Band chronology
The Roaring Silence (1976)	Watch (1978)	Angel Station (1979)

Singles from Watch
- 1. "California" Released: 18 November 1977; 2. "Mighty Quinn" Released: 3 March 1978

Professional ratings
Review scores
Source	Rating
AllMusic	2.0/5 stars
The Encyclopedia of Popular Music	3/5 stars
Musikexpress	5/5 stars
Rolling Stone	mixed
The Rolling Stone Album Guide	1/5 stars

Watch is the eighth album by Manfred Mann's Earth Band, a studio album with two live tracks released in 1978. It is the first album recorded with new bassist Pat King, and the final album for both guitarist Dave Flett and original drummer Chris Slade. In West Germany, it spent 69 weeks on the charts, peaking at number 3 and receiving platinum status in 1981.

== Track listing ==
Side one

1. "Circles" (Alan Mark) – 4:50
2. "Drowning on Dry Land/Fish Soup" (Chris Slade, Dave Flett, Manfred Mann) – 6:01
3. "Chicago Institute" (Peter Thomas, Mann, Flett) – 5:47
4. "California" (Sue Vickers) – 5:32

Side two

1. "Davy's on the Road Again" (Live) (John Simon, Robbie Robertson) – 5:55
2. "Martha's Madman" (Lane Tietgen) – 4:52
3. "Mighty Quinn" (Live) (Bob Dylan) – 6:29

Bonus tracks 1998 CD re-issue

8. "California" (single edit) (Sue Vickers) – 3:46
9. "Davy's on the Road Again" (single edit) (Simon, Robertson) – 3:38
10. "Bouillabaisse" (single edit) (Flett, Mann) – 4:02
11. "Mighty Quinn" (single edit) (Dylan) – 3:39

== Personnel ==
The Earth Band

- Chris Hamlet Thompson – vocals, guitar
- Manfred Mann – keyboards, backing vocals
- Dave Flett – lead guitar, acoustic guitar, backing vocals
- Pat King – bass guitar, backing vocals
- Chris Slade – drums, percussion

Additional musicians

- Doreen Chanter, Irene Chanter, Stevie Lange, Victy Silva, Kim Goddy – backing vocals

Technical

- Manfred Mann's Earth Band – producers
- Laurence Latham – engineer
- Rick Walton – engineer
- Edwin Cross – assistant engineer
- Michael Sanz – cover painting
- Pat King – photography
- Re-mastered by: Robert M Corich and Mike Brown

== Charts ==
=== Weekly charts ===
Chart (1978−1979)	Peak position
Australian Albums (Kent Music Report)	40
Austrian Albums (Ö3 Austria)	14
Canada Top Albums/CDs (RPM)	85
Dutch Albums (Album Top 100)	18
Finnish Albums (The Official Finnish Charts)	18
German Albums (Offizielle Top 100)	3
New Zealand Albums (RMNZ)	29
Norwegian Albums (VG-lista)	2
Swedish Albums (Sverigetopplistan)	9
UK Albums (Official Charts)	33
US Billboard 200	83

=== Monthly charts ===
Monthly chart performance for Watch
Chart (1981)	Peak position
Soviet Albums (Moskovskij Komsomolets)	2

=== Year-end charts ===
Chart (1978)	Position
German Albums (Offizielle Top 100)	3

Chart (1979)	Position
German Albums (Offizielle Top 100)	21

1981 year-end chart performance for Watch
Chart (1981)	Position
Soviet Albums (Moskovskij Komsomolets)	5

== Sales and certifications ==
Certifications for Watch
Region	Certification	Certified units/sales
Germany (BVMI)	Platinum	500,000^{^}
Netherlands (NVPI)	Gold	50,000^{^}
^{^} Shipments figures based on certification alone.
