= Lena Conradson =

Swedish singer

- Born: Lena Konradsson; 23 March 1948 (age 78); Lycksele, Sweden
- Genres: pop, schlager
- Occupation: singer
- Years active: 1959–1966

Lena Conradson, originally Konradsson, later Berglund, born 23 March 1948 in Lycksele, Sweden, is a Swedish singer. Releasing several EP records and singles between 1959 and 1966, she also sang in the Pearlettes trio in 1966.

In 1963, 15 years old, she recorded the original version of the Christmas song Hej, mitt vinterland.

== Discography ==
- Elefanttango (EP) (1959)
- Hej mitt vinterland (EP)
- Varje stjärna i det blå (EP) (1961)
- Banjo Boy (EP) (1961])
- Grannens flicka (+ Tomtar på loftet) (single)
- Tina och Marina (+ Jag har aldrig blivit kysst) (single) (1962)
- Ökensand (+ Ett glas mjölk med gräddstänk) (EP)
- Hilly Billy, ding dong, tuff tuff (EP)

== Cooperation ==
With the Pearlettes & Popsiders group she appeared on:

- Dancing in the street-Somewhere (1966)

== Filmography ==
- Längta efter kärlek
