= Magazine Madonna =

- Dutch 7" single covre

Single by Sherbet

from the album Photoplay
- B-side: "Still In Love With You"
- Released: March 1977
- Studio: EMI Studios Sydney
- Length: 4:07
- Label: Razzle, Epic
- Songwriter: Tony Mitchell
- Producers: Richard Lush, Sherbet

Sherbet singles chronology
"Rock Me Gently" (1976)	"Magazine Madonna" (1977)	"High Rollin'" (1977)

"Magazine Madonna" is a song by Australian band Sherbet, released in May 1977 as the lead single from the band's sixth studio album, Photoplay. The song peaked at number 2 in Australia.

== Track listing ==
No.	Title	Length
1.	"Magazine Madonna"	3:58
2.	"Rock Me Gently"	3:55

== Charts ==
=== Weekly charts ===
Chart (1977)	Peak position
Australia (Kent Music Report)	2
New Zealand (Recorded Music NZ)	25

=== Year-end charts ===
Chart (1977)	Position
Australia (Kent Music Report)	51
