= Génération 78 =

- Cover of single

Song by Dalida featuring Bruno Guillain
- Released: March 20, 1978
- Recorded: 1978
- Studio: CBE
- Genre: Disco
- Length: 6:46
- Label: International Shows
- Songwriter: Jeff Barnel
- Producer: Orlando

"Génération 78" is a song by French singer Dalida featuring French singer Bruno Guillain. It is a megamix of Dalida's previous hits, remixed in disco style, including a new piece written by Jeff Barnel that permeates throughout the song. First released on single in March 1978, it soon became #1 hit in France and achieved success in Europe and Canada.

Dalida was a pioneer in this field, as “Génération 78” is one of the first megamixes, and one of the first commercially successful remixes in history. It was soon followed by her second megamix "Ça me fait rêver", as well successful.

"Génération 78" was immediately featured with promotional video. Commercially distributed and repeatedly played, it is one of the earliest examples of what will become music video. It is often credited in France as the first French music clip.

== Description ==
The idea came from Dalida's team. Seventeen-year-old Bruno Guillain was already known to the public as a new actor. It was his first of only two collaborations with Dalida in the studio, the second being for "Ça me fait rêver".

=== Samples ===
A number of Dalida's previously released songs was sampled. They were all successes, so the song is reminiscent of a medley.

1. Come prima
2. Gondolier
3. Volare
4. Romantica
5. J'attendrai
6. Darla dirladada
7. Paroles, paroles
8. Les enfants du Pirée
9. Ciao ciao bambina
10. T'aimer follement
11. Le jour où la pluie viendra
12. Les Gitans
13. Gigi l'amoroso
14. Il venait d'avoir 18 ans
15. Bambino
16. Salma Ya Salama

== Bibliography ==
- L'argus Dalida: Discographie mondiale et cotations, by Daniel Lesueur, Éditions Alternatives, 2004. ISBN 2-86227-428-3 and ISBN 978-2-86227-428-7. (in French)
