= Rolnička Praha =

It was founded in 1978 by its director, Karel Virgler

Rolnička Praha is a children's choir based in Prague, Czech Republic. It was founded in 1978 by its director, Karel Virgler. Choral Study Rolnička has about 200 young singers from 5 to 19 years in 5 choir levels. Rolnička Praha's Touring Choir has 45 singers aged 10 to 19 years.

Rolnička Praha performs yearly at 30-40 concerts, both in Czech Republic and abroad. The children sing at large concert halls, in festivals, and at charitable concerts. They take part in projects and cooperate with orchestras, notable soloists and many other choirs. Rolnička Praha also invites choirs and orchestras from abroad to Prague for joint performances.

In recent years the choir has performed in many European countries and has embarked on three overseas tours. They have also received a number of international choir competition awards.

Rolnička Praha is a member of the Czech Choirs Association and cooperates with worldwide choir associations, such as the International Society for Children's Choral and Performing Arts in the United States .

== Notable projects ==
- 1997 – participated in Children of the World in Harmony Festival in Arizona, USA.
- 1999 – participated in "Voices of Europe" and Year 2000 welcome in Iceland (broadcast internationally).
- 2000 – Gold Prize "Excellent" at the International Competition in Montreux, Switzerland.
- 2001 – organization of the Prague portion of European Children of the World in Harmony Festival, with participation of children's choirs from the US, Canada and China.
- 2002 – winner of the 1st Prague International Festival of Folklore Songs; Bronze medal in XXth International Festival de Musica in Cantonigros, Spain.
- 2004 – concert tour to Morocco.
- 2006 – invitated to the Festival Noël en Alsace; a meeting of the 25 choirs from 20 states of the European Union and mass concert in Strasbourg Cathedral, France.
- 2007 – performed in the Czech music festival Prague Spring
- 2008 – concert tour to France.
- 2009 – concert tour to the US and Canada (venues included New York City, Rochester, Toronto, St. Marys, Chicago), including participation in the Children of the World in Harmony festival in Michigan.
- 2010 – concert tour to France with participation in the Rencontres Internationales festival in Provence.
- 2011 – concert tour to Poland.
- 2012 – concert tour to Lietua and Russia.
- 2012 – Christmas concert tour to France (Reims, Amiens, Montreuil-sur-Mer, Boulogne-sur-Mer, Paris) and Munchen.
