= Symphony No. 8 (Arnold) =

Symphony by Malcolm Arnold

Naxos recording of Malcolm Arnold's Symphonies Nos 7 & 8

The Symphony No. 8, Op. 124 by Malcolm Arnold was finished in November 1978.

== Background ==
The work was commissioned by the Rustam K. Kermani Foundation and given its first performance on 5 May 1979 in Troy, New York, with the Albany Symphony Orchestra conducted by Julius Hegyi. It is the only Arnold symphony to have had its premiere outside the United Kingdom.

The work was written after Arnold had lived in Ireland for a few years, and it prominently features an Irish march. The march is a rare example of Arnold re-using his earlier material: it originated from his score to the film "The Reckoning" (1969).

Shortly after writing this work, Arnold lapsed into a seven-year musical silence during which he was hospitalised and treated for depression. The work seems to reflect some of the bleakness in Arnold's life at the time.

== Structure ==
The symphony is in three movements:

1. Allegro
  The movement begins with a discordant martial flourish. A simple marching tune emerges on piccolo and harp, against a disquieting backdrop of dissonant strings. This develops over the course of the movement, which ends quietly and uncertainly with an almost inaudible tam-tam stroke.
2. Andantino
  An elegiac movement, which ends in a mood of hushed regret.
3. Vivace
  The final movement opens with a slightly crazed upbeat character, in the vein of Arnold's lighter orchestral pieces. The string fugato section is reminiscent of the style of Shostakovich (who had died in the meantime, since the composition of Arnold's previous symphony), but this mood is contrasted by the return of the movement's opening theme in a cocktail-lounge percussive style. The symphony closes with confidence.

== Instrumentation ==
The symphony is scored for 2 flutes, piccolo, 2 oboes, 2 clarinets, 2 bassoons, 4 horns, 3 trumpets, 3 trombones, tuba, timpani, cymbals, bass drum, snare drum, tam-tam, glockenspiel, vibraphone, harp and strings.

== Commercial recordings ==
- 1991 Vernon Handley and the Royal Philharmonic Orchestra on Conifer Records 74321-15005-2 (re-released on Decca 4765337)
- 2001 Andrew Penny and the RTÉ National Symphony Orchestra on Naxos Records 8.552001 (recorded 21–22 February 2000, in the presence of the composer)
- 2001 Rumon Gamba and the BBC Philharmonic Orchestra on Chandos Records CHAN 9967
