= 1978 Country Music Association Awards =

Annual US music awards ceremony

- Date: October 9, 1978
- Location: Grand Ole Opry House, Nashville, Tennessee
- Hosted by: Johnny Cash
- Most wins: n/a
- Most nominations: Dolly Parton; Willie Nelson (4 each)

Television/radio coverage
- Network: CBS

The 1978 Country Music Association Awards, 12th Ceremony, was held on October 9, 1978, at the Grand Ole Opry House, Nashville, Tennessee, and was hosted by CMA Award winner Johnny Cash.

== Winners and nominees ==
Winners in Bold.

Entertainer of the Year	Album of the Year
**Dolly Parton**; Crystal Gayle; Ronnie Milsap; Kenny Rogers; Mel Tillis	**It Was Almost Like A Song — Ronnie Milsap**; Country Boy — Don Williams; Heaven's Just A Sin Away — The Kendalls; Here You Come Again — Dolly Parton; Waylon and Willie — Waylon Jennings and Willie Nelson
Male Vocalist of the Year	Female Vocalist of the Year
**Don Williams**; Larry Gatlin; Ronnie Milsap; Willie Nelson; Kenny Rogers	**Crystal Gayle**; Janie Fricke; Emmylou Harris; Barbara Mandrell; Dolly Parton
Vocal Group of the Year	Vocal Duo of the Year
**Oak Ridge Boys**; Dave & Sugar; The Kendalls; Original Texas Playboys; Statler Brothers	**Kenny Rogers and Dottie West**; Conway Twitty and Loretta Lynn; Jim Ed Brown and Helen Cornelius; Johnny Duncan and Janie Fricke; Waylon Jennings and Willie Nelson
Single of the Year	Song of the Year
**"Heaven's Just A Sin Away" — The Kendalls**; "Blue Bayou" — Linda Ronstadt; "Here You Come Again" — Dolly Parton; "Mamas Don't Let Your Babies Grow Up To Be Cowboys" — Waylon Jennings and Willie Nelson; "Take This Job And Shove It" — Johnny Paycheck	**"Don't It Make My Brown Eyes Blue" — Richard Leigh**; "Heaven's Just A Sin Away" — Jerry Gillespie; "It Was Almost Like A Song" — Hal David and Archie Jordan; "Mamas Don't Let Your Babies Grow Up To Be Cowboys" — Ed Bruce and Patsy Bruce; "Take This Job And Shove It" — David Allan Coe
Instrumental Group of the Year	Instrumentalist of the Year
**Oak Ridge Boys Band**; Asleep At The Wheel; Charlie Daniels Band; Danny Davis & The Nashville Brass; Chet Atkins and Les Paul	**Roy Clark**; Chet Atkins; Johnny Gimble; Charlie McCoy; Jerry Reed

== Country Music Hall of Fame ==
- Grandpa Jones
