= Sherbet (Sherbet album) =

Studio album by Sherbet
- Released: August 1978
- Genres: Rock, pop
- Length: 38:26
- Labels: Festival, Infinity
- Producer: Jay Lewis

Sherbet chronology
| Caught in the Act... Live (1977) | Sherbet (1978) | Track Record (1979) |

Singles from Sherbet
- 1. "(Feels Like It's) Slipping Away" Released: February 1978; 2. "Another Night on the Road" Released: July 1978; 3. "Beg Steal or Borrow" Released: 1978

Sherbet is the seventh studio album by Australian band, Sherbet released in August 1978. The album peaked at number 6 on the Kent Music Report.

The album was titled Highway 1 by Highway in North America.

== Track listing ==
Side A
| No. | Title | Writer(s) | Length |
|---|---|---|---|
| 1. | "(Feels Like It's) Slippin' Away" | Garth Porter, Warren Morgan | 3:29 |
| 2. | "Skyline" | Porter, Harvey James | 3:58 |
| 3. | "Another Night on the Road" | Porter, Tony Mitchell, Roger Davies, Jon Wood | 3:59 |
| 4. | "Don't Wait Too Long" | Porter, Mitchell, Alan Sandow, James | 3:36 |
| 5. | "Winnipeg Sidestep" | Porter, Mitchell, Sandow, James | 3:38 |

Side B
| No. | Title | Writer(s) | Length |
|---|---|---|---|
| 1. | "Take My Heart" | Porter, Mitchell, Sandow | 3:28 |
| 2. | "Cheatin' Eyes" | Porter, Mitchell, Sandow | 4:09 |
| 3. | "You Made a Fool" | Porter, Tom Seufert | 3:46 |
| 4. | "(If I) Breakdown" | Porter, Mitchell, Seufert | 4:09 |
| 5. | "Beg, Steal or Borrow" | Porter, Mitchell, James | 3:55 |
| Total length: | | | 38:26 |

== Personnel ==
- Bass, vocals – Tony Mitchell
- Drums – Alan Sandow
- Guitar, vocals – Harvey James
- Keyboards, vocals – Garth Porter
- Lead vocals – Daryl Braithwaite

== Charts ==
| Chart (1977) | Peak position |
|---|---|
| Australia Kent Music Report | 6 |

== Release history ==
| Country | Date | Label | Format | Catalog |
|---|---|---|---|---|
| Australia | August 1978 | Festival | LP, Cassette | L 36617 |
| Australia | 1999 | Infinity, Festival Records | CD | D20089 |
