= Caught in the Act... Live =

Live album by Sherbet
- Released: October 1977
- Genre: Rock, pop
- Length: 35:42
- Label: Festival
- Producer: Sherbet, Richard Lush

Sherbet chronology
Photoplay (1977)	Caught in the Act... Live (1977)	Sherbet (1978)

Singles from Caught in the Act... Live
- 1. "Nowhere Man" Released: November 1977

Caught in the Act... Live is the second live album by Australian band, Sherbet. The album was released in October 1977. The album peaked at number 33 on the Kent Music Report.

== Track listing ==
Side A
No.	Title	Writer(s)	Length
1.	"You Keep Me Hangin' On"	Brian Holland, Eddie Holland, Lamont Dozier	4:15
2.	"Dancer"	Garth Porter, Tony Mitchell	3:16
3.	"Midsummer Madness"	Porter, Mitchell, Harvey James	3:23
4.	"Howzat"	Porter, Mitchell	3:38
5.	"Motor of Love"	Porter, Mitchell, Alan Sandow	3:11

Side B
No.	Title	Writer(s)	Length
1.	"High Rollin'"	Porter, Mitchell	4:02
2.	"Rock Me Gently"	Porter, Mitchell, Daryl Braithwaite, Alan Sandow	3:57
3.	"Nowhere Man"	John Lennon, Paul McCartney	2:27
4.	"Hollywood Dreaming"	Porter	3:50
5.	"Blueswalkin'"	Porter, Mitchell, Sandow	3:43
Total length:			35:42

== Personnel ==
- Bass Guitar – Tony Mitchell
- Drums – Alan Sandow
- Guitars – Harvey James
- Keyboards, Vocals – Garth Porter
- Lead Vocals – Daryl Braithwaite

== Chart positions ==
Chart (1977/78)	Peak position
Australia (Kent Music Report)	33

== Release history ==
Country	Date	Label	Format	Catalog
Australia	October 1977	Festival	LP, Cassette	L-36417

== Notes ==
- All tracks recorded during Sherbet's Photoplay Australian National Tour May–July 1977
