= Samuelsons =

Swedish country and gospel group

The Samuelsons
- Origin: Sweden
- Genres: country, gospel
- Years active: 1970s-1988
- Past members: Rolf Samuelson, Kjell Samuelson, Olle Samuelson, Jard Samuelson

The Samuelsons was a country and gospel group from Sweden, between the 1970s and 1980s. It consisted of the brothers Rolf (1939–1981), Kjell (born 1942), Olle (born 1950) and Jard Samuelson (born 1952).

In 1966 Kjell & Rolf released the first album in America which was awarded three stars by Billboard. They soon became popular throughout Canada and the U.S.

The Samuelson brothers toured in Scandinavia with Pat Boone, Dolly Parton, Tammy Wynette, Marty Robbins and Wanda Jackson and participated several times at the Grand Ole Opry in Nashville.

On their records made in Nashville, musicians that played with Elvis Presley, Dolly Parton and Johnny Cash participated, such as Charlie McCoy, Weldon Myrick, Kenny Malone, Reggie Young, Larrie Londin, Tony Brown, Ron Oates, Bill Pursell, Pete Wade, Harold Bradley and Buddy Harman.

The group made over 30 albums in Swedish and English which were sold in over 1.5 million copies on their own record label Pilot Music and Heart Warming and Impact Records in the U.S.
