= All Night Long (Sammy Hagar album) =

Live album by Sammy Hagar
- Released: August 1978 - (July 17th, 1978 - US) - According to Billboard Magazine (US); July 1979 (UK)
- Genre: Hard rock
- Length: 40:25
- Label: Capitol
- Producers: John Carter, Sammy Hagar

Sammy Hagar chronology
| Musical Chairs (1977) | All Night Long (1978) | Street Machine (1979) |

Loud & Clear
- The cover of the UK release of the album

Professional ratings
Review scores
| Source | Rating |
|---|---|
| AllMusic | 3/5 stars |
| Record Collector | 3/5 stars |
| Record Mirror | 4.5/5 stars |
| Record Mirror | 5/5 stars |

All Night Long (Loud & Clear in the UK) is Sammy Hagar's first live album, released in 1978. The album was recorded during concerts in San Francisco, San Antonio, San Bernardino, Santa Cruz and Santa Monica.

All Night Long was not released in the UK until 1979 under a new title, Loud & Clear, and with new cover artwork. Additionally, a live version of Montrose's "Space Station #5" was added to the end of the album.

== Track listings ==
=== Vinyl & cassette edition ===
Side one
| No. | Title | Writer(s) | Length |
|---|---|---|---|
| 1. | "Red" (San Francisco, CA, July 4, 1978) | John Carter, Sammy Hagar | 5:10 |
| 2. | "Rock 'N' Roll Weekend" (San Antonio, TX, June 21, 1978) | Hagar | 3:40 |
| 3. | "Make It Last/Reckless" (Santa Monica, CA, March 23, 1978) | Hagar | 6:40 |
| 4. | "Turn Up the Music" (San Bernardino, CA, March 28, 1978) | Carter, Hagar | 5:15 |
| Total length: | | | 20:45 |

Side two
| No. | Title | Writer(s) | Length |
|---|---|---|---|
| 5. | "I've Done Everything for You" (Santa Cruz, CA, June 9, 1978) | Hagar | 3:35 |
| 6. | "Young Girl Blues" (San Antonio, TX, June 21, 1978) | Donovan | 9:00 |
| 7. | "Bad Motor Scooter" (San Francisco, CA, July 4, 1978) | Hagar | 7:07 |
| Total length: | | | 19:40 |

=== CD edition ===
| No. | Title | Writer(s) | Length |
|---|---|---|---|
| 1. | "Red" | John Carter, Sammy Hagar | 5:10 |
| 2. | "Rock 'N' Roll Weekend" | Hagar | 3:40 |
| 3. | "Make It Last/Reckless" | Hagar | 6:40 |
| 4. | "Turn Up the Music" | Carter, Hagar | 5:15 |
| 5. | "I've Done Everything for You" | Hagar | 3:35 |
| 6. | "Young Girl Blues" | Donovan | 9:00 |
| 7. | "Bad Motor Scooter" | Hagar | 7:07 |
| Total length: | | | 40:25 |

== Song information ==
- The only song from Hagar's first solo album, Nine on a Ten Scale, is the Donovan cover, "Young Girl Blues".
- "Red" and "Rock 'n' Roll Weekend" were both originally found on Hagar's second studio album, Sammy Hagar.
- "Reckless" and "Turn Up the Music" were both originally found on Hagar's third studio album Musical Chairs.
- "I've Done Everything for You" is a Hagar original, which went on to be a hit single for Rick Springfield.
- Three tracks from Montrose's first album, Montrose, appear in this collection: "Make It Last", "Bad Motor Scooter" and, from the UK version only, "Space Station #5".
- All tracks minus "Young Girl Blues" were re-released as part of the Red Hot! compilation.

== Personnel ==
Adapted from Discogs.

- Sammy Hagar – lead vocals, guitar
- Gary Pihl – guitar, backing vocals
- Bill Church – bass guitar, backing vocals
- Denny Carmassi – drums
- Alan Fitzgerald – keyboards, backing vocals

Production

- Sammy Hagar, John Carter – Production
- Ken Perry – Mastering
- Richard Digby Smith, Steve Thompson – Engineering
- Warren Dewey – Assistant Engineer
- Dennis Callahan, Michael N. Marks, Randy Bachman – band photography
- Roy Kohara – Art Direction
- Michael Zagaris – photography

== Charts ==
| Chart (1978) | Peak position |
|---|---|
| Canada Top Albums/CDs (RPM) | 94 |

== Releases ==
- 1978 Capitol US SMAS-11812
- 1978 Capitol US SN-16326
- 1978 Capitol Germany 1C 064-85 594
- 1979 Capitol UK E-ST 25330 (as "Loud & Clear")
- 1979 Capitol Holland 1A 062-86063 (as "Loud & Clear")
- 1992 BGO Records UK BGOCD149 (as "Loud & Clear")
- 1996 One Way Records US 72438 19094 23
- 2016 Rock Candy Records US 241159 3914
