= Davy's on the Road Again =

Single by Manfred Mann's Earth Band
- B-side: "Bouillabaisse"
- Released: 5 May 1978
- Length: 5:55
- Label: Bronze (UK); Warner Bros. (USA)
- Songwriter: John Simon/Robbie Robertson
- Producer: Manfred Mann

"Davy's on the Road Again" is a 1970 song by John Simon and written by Simon and Robbie Robertson. First released on John Simon's Album, the song charted at No. 6 on the UK Singles Chart when covered by Manfred Mann's Earth Band.

== Background and original ==
John Simon produced the Band's first solo album, 1968's Music from Big Pink, which had charted at No. 30 on the Billboard Hot 100. They worked together again for the Band's second album, 1969's The Band; the band's Robbie Robertson wrote The Band's songs very quickly, which gave him free time between sessions, during which he co-wrote "Davey's on the Road Again". The song ended up on Simon's debut album John Simon's Album, which featured many of the musicians he had been working with over the last couple of years. AllMusic wrote that the song "could be a lost Band track in its playing and texture", and complimented Merry Clayton's "soaring backing vocal" for adding "a special wrinkle" and for evoking Leonard Cohen's Songs of Leonard Cohen.

== Manfred Mann's Earth Band version ==
Manfred Mann's Earth Band covered the song in 1977 during a concert at Roxy Theatre in Hollywood, Los Angeles; Billboard wrote that their "fresh and tender approach to the drastically overused theme of life as a rock musician injected a few moments of alluring sentiment" into the set. A live version of the song appeared on the band's Watch, their 1978 album, as one of two live tracks, the other a take on Manfred Mann's "Quinn the Eskimo (Mighty Quinn)" (itself a cover of a song by Bob Dylan). When released as a single, that version charted at No. 6 on the UK Singles Chart, becoming the biggest of the band's three top ten hits in that country. The single version of the song was used in early pressings of the soundtrack of The Stud, a softcore pornography film featuring Joan Collins as a nymphomaniac; in 2020, the journalist Carl Meyer wrote in Pattaya Mail that his 1978 interview with Manfred Mann had soured due to him mentioning its appearance in the film and that Mann lost his temper after receiving confirmation of its presence from his press secretary.
