= Guillaume Cizeron =

French ice dancer (born 1994)

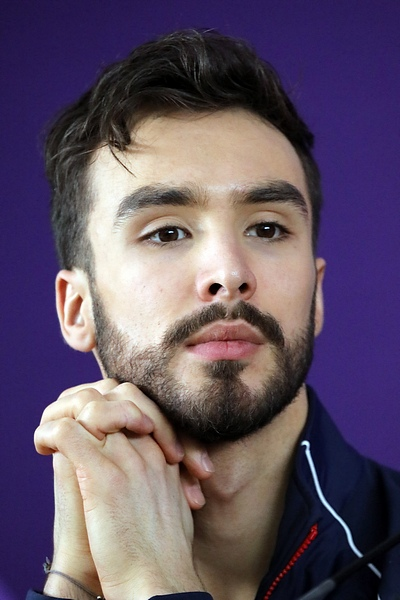
- Cizeron at the 2018 Winter Olympic Games

Personal information
- Born: 12 November 1994 (age 32) Montbrison, Loire, France
- Home town: Allier, France
- Height: 1.85 m (6 ft 1 in)

Figure skating career
- Country: France
- Partner: Laurence Fournier Beaudry (since 2025); Gabriella Papadakis (c. 2004–2024)
- Coach: Romain Haguenauer, Marie-France Dubreuil, Patrice Lauzon, Catherine Pinard
- Skating club: Clermont-Ferrand; Gadbois Centre
- Began skating: 2002
- Highest WS: 2 (2017–2019)
Event	Gold medal – first place	Silver medal – second place	Bronze medal – third place
Olympic Games	2	1	0
World Championships	6	1	0
European Championships	6	1	0
Grand Prix Final	2	2	1
French Championships	8	1	0
World Junior Championships	0	1	0
Junior Grand Prix Final	0	1	0
Medal list
Olympic Games
Gold medal – first place	2022 Beijing	Ice dance
Gold medal – first place	2026 Milano Cortina	Ice dance
Silver medal – second place	2018 Pyeongchang	Ice dance
World Championships
Gold medal – first place	2015 Shanghai	Ice dance
Gold medal – first place	2016 Boston	Ice dance
Gold medal – first place	2018 Milan	Ice dance
Gold medal – first place	2019 Saitama	Ice dance
Gold medal – first place	2022 Montpellier	Ice dance
Gold medal – first place	2026 Prague	Ice dance
Silver medal – second place	2017 Helsinki	Ice dance
European Championships
Gold medal – first place	2015 Stockholm	Ice dance
Gold medal – first place	2016 Bratislava	Ice dance
Gold medal – first place	2017 Ostrava	Ice dance
Gold medal – first place	2018 Moscow	Ice dance
Gold medal – first place	2019 Minsk	Ice dance
Gold medal – first place	2026 Sheffield	Ice dance
Silver medal – second place	2020 Graz	Ice dance
Grand Prix Final
Gold medal – first place	2017–18 Nagoya	Ice dance
Gold medal – first place	2019–20 Torino	Ice dance
Silver medal – second place	2016–17 Marseille	Ice dance
Silver medal – second place	2025–26 Nagoya	Ice dance
Bronze medal – third place	2014–15 Barcelona	Ice dance
French Championships
Gold medal – first place	2015 Megève	Ice dance
Gold medal – first place	2016 Épinal	Ice dance
Gold medal – first place	2017 Caen	Ice dance
Gold medal – first place	2018 Nantes	Ice dance
Gold medal – first place	2019 Vaujany	Ice dance
Gold medal – first place	2020 Dunkirk	Ice dance
Gold medal – first place	2022 Cergy-Pontoise	Ice dance
Gold medal – first place	2026 Briancon	Ice dance
Silver medal – second place	2014 Vaujany	Ice dance
World Junior Championships
Silver medal – second place	2013 Milan	Ice dance
Junior Grand Prix Final
Silver medal – second place	2012–13 Sochi	Ice dance

Guillaume Cizeron (French pronunciation: [ɡijom sizʁɔ̃]; born 12 November 1994) is a French ice dancer. With current partner Laurence Fournier Beaudry, he is the 2026 Olympic champion, the 2026 World champion, the 2026 European champion, the 2025–26 Grand Prix Final silver medalist, a three-time Grand Prix champion, and the 2026 French national champion.

With former partner Gabriella Papadakis, he is the 2022 Olympic champion, the 2018 Olympic silver medalist, a five-time World champion (2015–2016, 2018–2019, 2022), a five-time consecutive European champion (2015–2019), the 2017 and 2019 Grand Prix Final champion, and a seven-time French national champion (2015–2020, 2022). They have won ten gold medals in the Grand Prix series. Earlier in their career, they won silver at the 2012 Junior Grand Prix Final and 2013 World Junior Championships.

Papadakis and Cizeron have broken world records 28 times, which is in itself a record across all figure skating disciplines since the introduction of the ISU Judging System in 2004. They are the former and historical world record holders in short/rhythm dance, free dance, and combined total. They are the first team to have broken the 90-point barrier in the rhythm dance, the 120-point and 130-point barriers in the free dance, and the first team to score above the 200-point, 210-point, and 220-point barriers in the combined total score.

Papadakis and Cizeron were recognized for their graceful and balletic style. Their programs, inspired by modern dance, have been described as lyrical, and commentators have frequently acclaimed the quality of their skating skills.

== Personal life ==
Cizeron was born on 12 November 1994 in Montbrison, Loire, France. His father, Marc, is president of the Auvergne Clermont Danse sur Glace skating club. He studied fine arts in Lyon for a period while training for competitive ice dancing.

He and his dance partner Gabriella Papadakis moved to Montreal, Canada in 2014 in order to continue working with their coach Romain Haguenauer. The latter had joined the Ice Academy of Montreal.

Cizeron had been open about being gay with family, friends, and many in the skating community for many years. In May 2020, both to honour the International Day Against Homophobia, Transphobia and Biphobia and to help people in places that are not as open to LGBTQ people, he made a public post on Instagram of him and his boyfriend and shared some words with the media.

Cizeron and Papadakis ended their successful dance partnership in 2024, after taking time off from competition following winning the gold at the Olympics in 2022. They had disagreements about values surrounding sexual assault allegations of a fellow competitor.

In January 2026, shortly before Papadakis published her memoir Pour ne pas disparaître ("To Not Disappear"), in which she explored some of their differences, she spoke with France Info. She described Cizeron as a controlling, demanding, and critical ice dance partner. She said, "The idea of being alone with him terrifies me. His attitude throws me off balance. Sometimes he ignores me; sometimes he plays the best friend, as if nothing were wrong […] His coldness chills me to the bone." Papadakis also alleged that, a year before their final separation, Cizeron had threatened to stop skating with her. This was in response to her telling him she intended to file a complaint against a French figure skating coach who raped her during her teenage years while the pair trained in Lyon.

On 13 January 2026, two days before the release of the memoir, Cizeron announced that his lawyers had sent a formal notice of cease and desist to Papadakis and her publisher. He said that her allegations against him were false and that she was orchestrating a "smear campaign" against him.

== Competitive ice dance career ==
=== Partnership with Gabriella Papadakis ===
==== Early career ====
Papadakis and Cizeron teamed up when they were about 9 or 10 years old in Clermont-Ferrand at the suggestion of her mother, Catherine Papadakis, who coached them from the beginning of their partnership.

==== 2009–2010 season ====
They debuted on the ISU Junior Grand Prix series in 2009–10, placing 15th at JGP United States. They were 22nd at the 2010 World Junior Championships.

==== 2010–2011 season ====
In 2010–11, Papadakis/Cizeron finished 4th at JGP France and then won bronze at their second event, in Austria. They advanced to 12th at the 2011 World Junior Championships.

==== 2011–2012 season ====
In 2011–12, Papadakis/Cizeron finished 4th at both of their Junior Grand Prix events. They rose to 5th at the 2012 World Junior Championships.

==== 2012–2013 season ====
In mid-June 2012, Papadakis/Cizeron decided to move to Lyon to train with new coaches Muriel Zazoui, Romain Haguenauer, and Olivier Schoenfelder. They competed in their fourth season of the Junior Grand Prix, winning their first title at JGP France and then taking another gold medal at JGP Austria, where they scored their personal best of 142.08 points. Their wins qualified them for the 2012–13 JGP Final in Sochi, Russia. Papadakis/Cizeron won the silver medal in Sochi behind Russian ice dancers Alexandra Stepanova / Ivan Bukin. At the 2013 World Junior Championships in Milan, the French placed second in the short dance. On the day of the free dance, Papadakis sprained her ankle in an off-ice warm-up before the morning practice. During the competition, she paused after 2:52 minutes and was allowed a medical break, after which she and Cizeron completed the dance. They placed third in the free dance and second overall, stepping onto the podium along with gold medalists Stepanova/Bukin and bronze medalists Aldridge/Eaton.

==== 2013–2014 season ====
Papadakis/Cizeron decided to move up to the senior level for the 2013–14 season. They made their senior international debut at the International Cup of Nice, winning gold. The duo then competed at two senior Grand Prix assignments, placing fifth at the 2013 Trophée Eric Bompard and seventh at the 2013 Rostelecom Cup. Initially named as alternates for the 2014 European Championships, they were called up when Nathalie Péchalat / Fabian Bourzat withdrew. They placed 15th at the event, held in January in Budapest, and 13th at the 2014 World Championships, held in March in Saitama.

==== 2014–2015 season ====
In July 2014, Papadakis/Cizeron relocated with Haguenauer to Montreal, Quebec, Canada. Marie-France Dubreuil, Patrice Lauzon, and Pascal Denis joined Haguenauer as the duo's coaches. Their free dance was inspired by a ballet, Le Parc. The two began their season by winning an ISU Challenger Series event, the 2014 Skate Canada Autumn Classic, where they defeated Piper Gilles / Paul Poirier. In November, Papadakis/Cizeron reached their first Grand Prix podium, winning gold at the 2014 Cup of China ahead of Maia Shibutani / Alex Shibutani and 2014 World champions Anna Cappellini / Luca Lanotte. Beating Gilles/Poirier again, they took their second GP title at the 2014 Trophée Éric Bompard and qualified for their first Grand Prix Final. At the latter event, held in December 2014 in Barcelona, they placed fifth in the short dance, third in the free dance, and third overall behind Kaitlyn Weaver / Andrew Poje and Madison Chock / Evan Bates.

In January 2015, Papadakis/Cizeron ranked first in both segments at the 2015 European Championships in Stockholm and took the gold medal by a margin of 8.45 points over the World champions, Anna Cappellini / Luca Lanotte. In March, they competed at the World Championships in Shanghai, China. Ranked fourth in the short dance and first in the free dance, they finished first overall ahead of Madison Chock / Evan Bates, whom they outscored by 2.94 points. They were the first French skaters to win a World title since 2008 and the youngest World champions in ice dance in 49 years.

==== 2015–2016 season ====
On 28 August 2015, Papadakis sustained a cerebral concussion after a fall in practice. According to Dubreuil, "They clipped each other's blades, and she fell right on her head. The symptoms were instant. We could see she was walking wobbly; she had trouble putting words together." Subsequently, Papadakis/Cizeron withdrew from the Master's de Patinage in Orléans scheduled in the second week of October. On 12 November 2015, they withdrew from their Grand Prix events, the 2015 Trophée Éric Bompard and 2015 NHK Trophy. Doctors were uncertain about how long her recovery would take. In March 2016, Papadakis said, "I couldn't go out, skate, read, or have a conversation with people. It was impossible to concentrate. I still have some symptoms."

Papadakis/Cizeron returned to competition in December to win their second national title. The following month, at the 2016 European Championships in Bratislava, Papadakis/Cizeron placed second to Italy's Anna Cappellini / Luca Lanotte in the short dance. They were first in the free dance and won their second consecutive European title. In March, a skate blade hit Papadakis' knee while she was practicing steps with Cizeron. According to Haguenauer, "Her knee was open, she had eight stitches but it's superficial," and she resumed training on 21 March. Papadakis/Cizeron placed first in the short dance at the 2016 World Championships in Boston, ahead of Maia Shibutani / Alex Shibutani of the United States. They set a world record score in the free program of 118.17, beating the previous world record held by Meryl Davis / Charlie White of the United States of 116.63 at the 2014 Winter Olympics. They won the competition with a personal best overall score of 194.46, 6.03 points ahead of Maia Shibutani / Alex Shibutani. The duo withdrew from their final competition of the season, the 2016 Team Challenge Cup in April 2016, because Papadakis had a mild case of mononucleosis.

==== 2016–2017 season ====
Competing in the 2016–17 Grand Prix series, Papadakis/Cizeron won gold at the 2016 Trophée de France and silver at the 2016 NHK Trophy, behind Canada's Tessa Virtue / Scott Moir. In December 2016, they received the silver medal at the Grand Prix Final in Marseille, France, finishing second again to Virtue/Moir. With numerous small mistakes popping up they were showing the most vulnerability since their rise to the top and were only 3rd in the short dance of this event behind Shibutani/Shibutani.

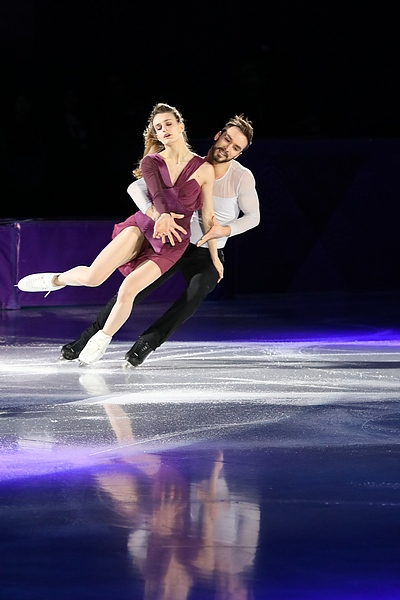
Papadakis/Cizeron at the 2018 Winter Olympics

In January 2017, Papadakis/Cizeron won their third continental title at the European Championships in Ostrava, Czech Republic, although they were only 3rd in the short dance behind Ekaterina Bobrova/Dmitri Soloviev and Anna Cappellini/Luca Lanotte. At the 2017 World Figure Skating Championships they came in as underdogs after their previous defeats to Virtue/Moir. They won the free dance portion handily with a new personal best and free dance world record of 119.15 points, but due to another subpar performance in the short dance, lost for a 3rd straight time to Virtue/Moir, taking the silver medal.

==== 2017–2018 season ====
For the 2017-18 Grand Prix season, Papadakis and Cizeron were assigned to the Cup of China and the Internationaux de France. At the Cup of China, they set their new short dance personal best of 81.10, a new free dance world record of 119.33 points, and a new overall world record becoming the first team to surpass 200 points with 200.43 points. At the 2017 Internationaux de France they set another short dance personal best of 81.40, a new free dance personal best and world record of 120.58 points, and a new overall world record of 201.98 points.

Papadakis and Cizeron won their first ever Grand Prix Final, setting another new short program personal best of 82.07 points, and a new overall world record of 202.16. They won their 4th consecutive European Championships ice dancing title, the first team to accomplish that since Marina Klimova/Sergei Ponomarenko from 1989 to 1992, handily winning both programs.

At the 2018 Winter Olympics in Pyeongchang, Papadakis and Cizeron finished second in the short dance with a score of 81.93 despite Papadakis suffering a wardrobe malfunction, and first in the free skate with a world record score of 123.35, to claim the silver medal. Papadakis and Cizeron finished the season at the World Championships, where they claimed their third title with world record scores in the short dance, free dance, and overall.

==== 2018–2019 season ====
For the 2018-2019 Grand Prix Season, Papadakis and Cizeron were assigned to 2018 NHK Trophy and 2018 Internationaux de France. However, they had to withdraw from NHK Trophy because of Cizeron's injury to his back. Competing at the 2018 Internationaux de France in Grenoble, they won the gold medal and set new world records in both programs and overall. Cizeron stated: "I feel like we shared a very good moment with the audience. It was the first time we've done our free program this year, so we had a little bit of stress, but I feel the audience connected to it."

After winning their fifth consecutive French national title, Papadakis/Cizeron next competed at the 2019 European Championships, which they also won for the fifth straight time, setting new world records in the process. Cizeron expressed satisfaction with the free dance, which he called "almost technically perfect." They then went on to claim their fourth World title at the 2019 World Championships, again setting new world records in the rhythm dance, free dance, and overall score. Papadakis/Cizeron concluded the season at the 2019 World Team Trophy, setting new world records in both the free skating and overall score, while Team France finished fourth overall.

==== 2019–2020 season ====
Eschewing the Challenger series, Papadakis/Cizeron debuted their programs at Master's de Patinage before making their first international appearance on the Grand Prix at the 2019 Internationaux de France. They set the world record in the rhythm dance again, eight points ahead of Chock/Bates in second place. They performed their free dance, performed mainly to spoken word poetry, and won the event by a wide margin. At 2019 NHK Trophy, they again set the world record in the rhythm dance with a score of 90.03 and became the first couple in history to score over 90 points in the segment. Winning the free dance as well, they set another set of world records and qualified first to the Grand Prix Final.

Competing at the Grand Prix Final, Papadakis stumbled out of her twizzle in the rhythm dance's midline step sequence, leading to them scoring 83.83, their lowest rhythm dance score under the post-2018 judging system. They nevertheless placed first in that segment, albeit narrowly. They won the free dance decisively with close to their previous world record score, winning their second Grand Prix Final gold.

After collecting another French national title, Papadakis/Cizeron competed at the 2020 European Championships in Graz. After the rhythm dance, they were in first place, separated from Sinitsina/Katsalapov by only 0.05 points. In a close result, they lost the free dance and in the overall result finished behind by 0.14 points, winning the silver medal. This marked the first time anyone had beaten Papadakis/Cizeron since Virtue/Moir at the 2018 Winter Olympics, and the first time they had been defeated in the free dance since the 2016–17 Grand Prix Final. The result was considered a major upset, with Katsalapov remarking "to get anywhere near Gabriella and Guillaume seemed impossible for all the skaters." Papadakis said "we can't always win and we accept that. It is a lesson for us that we probably needed. We knew the competition was very close, so yes, we knew we did not have room for mistakes, and we made them."

The European result generated immediate speculation that Sinitsina/Katsalapov could challenge Papadakis/Cizeron for gold at the 2020 World Championships in Montreal, but these were cancelled as a result of the coronavirus pandemic.

==== 2020–2021 season ====
With the pandemic affecting international travel, the ISU opted to assign the Grand Prix based primarily on geographic location, but Papadakis/Cizeron were nonetheless assigned to the 2020 Internationaux de France, necessitating traveling from Canada to France. However, the Internationaux was ultimately cancelled due to the pandemic as well. Both skaters contracted COVID-19 in July 2020, after contact with a third individual, resulting in them being away from the ice for three weeks.

On 11 November 2020, L'Equipe reported that Papadakis/Cizeron would skip both the French and European championships for that season to focus on the World Championships in Stockholm, citing the difficulty of traveling back and forth between countries frequently.

On 20 January 2021, Papadakis/Cizeron announced that they would withdraw from the World Championships and would instead be focusing on the 2021/2022 season and the 2022 Olympics. Cizeron stated their reason: "We have never known such a long time without skating. The series of cancellations provoked a climate of uncertainty and doubt that is difficult for all top-level athletes to manage."

==== 2021–2022 season ====
Entering the Olympic season, Papadakis/Cizeron had not decided whether this would be their final competitive year, with Papadakis stating they were "both in that mindset of let's do this season, let's train for the Olympics and then we will see." For the street dance-themed rhythm dance, the duo enlisted outside choreographer Axelle Munezero to work on a program based on waacking, a dance style created in Los Angeles' LGBT clubs during the Disco Era. Papadakis and Cizeron spent six months studying the history of the dance before beginning the choreographic process, with Munezero saying she approached it as if she was "training dancers that wanted to become waackers and do that as a living."

The team began the year at the 2021 CS Finlandia Trophy, winning the gold medal. Shortly afterward a controversy emerged relating to homophobic comments made by Russian skating judge Alexander Vedenin, who said that due to Cizeron's homosexuality there would always be a lack of chemistry between the partners. The French federation wrote a letter to the International Skating Union in response.

Papadakis/Cizeron were initially assigned to the 2021 Cup of China as their first Grand Prix, but after its cancellation, they were reassigned to the 2021 Gran Premio d'Italia in Turin. They won both segments and the event, taking the gold medal. Cizeron cited improved levels on elements since the Finlandia Trophy as their main takeaway, while saying further improvement was necessary. At their second event, the 2021 Internationaux de France, Papadakis/Cizeron again won gold. Performing at home in their own country, Papadakis said they "appreciate it now after the pandemic that it is possible to have an event with such a big audience." Their results qualified them for the Grand Prix Final, but it was subsequently cancelled due to restrictions prompted by the Omicron variant.

After winning the French national title again, Papadakis/Cizeron were named to the French Olympic team and opted to withdraw from the 2022 European Championships to avoid the risk of the Omicron variant prior to the Olympics.

Competing at the 2022 Winter Olympics in Beijing, Papadakis/Cizeron began the dance event with a record-setting rhythm dance score of 90.83, 1.98 points ahead of Russian rivals Sinitsina/Katsalapov in second. Papadakis said they were "positively superstitious" about the Olympics as "we've always skated very well in China, and why should it be different this time?" They also went on to win the free dance, setting a new world record for total score (226.98). Cizeron said that "the silver four years ago made us to want the gold medal more than anything else. I think we've never worked that hard for a specific goal throughout our career. All the gold medals came one after the other without us really wanting them as a precise goal. This year we gathered the courage actually to want to win."

Papadakis and Cizeron concluded the season at the 2022 World Championships, held on home soil in Montpellier. Longtime rivals Sinitsina/Katsalapov were absent due to the International Skating Union banning all Russian athletes due to their country's invasion of Ukraine. They won the rhythm dance by a world record score of 92.73, 3.01 points over training mates Hubbell/Donohue. In the free dance they set another world record (137.09) as well as a world record for total score (229.82), taking their fifth World title. With Hubbell/Donohue taking the silver medal and Chock/Bates the bronze, the entire podium consisted of skaters from the Ice Academy of Montreal. Papadakis remarked "we're so lucky to have been surrounded by our closest friends here on the podium. I think that's very rare and it's what makes it worth it – gold medals, and the event, and the work. I think friendship, in the end, is what stays."

In June 2022, Papadakis and Cizeron announced that they would take a one-year break from competition but would not rule out returning and pushing for the 2026 Winter Olympics. Cizeron said, "if we were stopping for good, we'd say it." On the possibility of continuing, Papadakis added "creating something new coupled with our will as artists would be a reason to come back. You need an inner fire to compete."

Papadakis and Cizeron extended their break for an additional season in April 2023. They officially announced their retirement from competitive ice dance on December 3, 2024.

=== Partnership with Laurence Fournier Beaudry ===
==== 2025–2026 season: Olympic, World and European champions ====
In March 2025, Cizeron announced he would return to competition with new ice dance partner Laurence Fournier Beaudry who previously represented Canada with her former partner Nikolaj Sørensen. When talking about whether or not they aimed to compete at the 2026 Olympics, Cizeron said, "It's really part of the goals we've set. I think there would be disappointment if we didn't go. It's a risk we're ready to take."

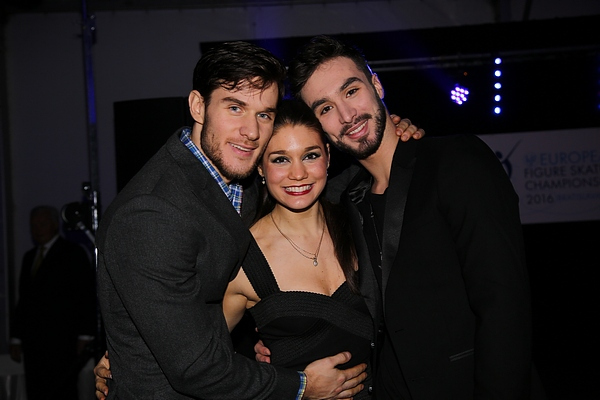
Sørensen, Fournier Beaudry, and Cizeron at the 2016 European Championships

In May 2025, in an interview with the Canadian press, the new partnership supported Nikolaj Sørensen, Fournier Beaudry's former skating partner, and current romantic partner, who was accused of sexual assault and suspended for a minimum of 6 years for "sexual abuse." Cizeron's former ice dance partner, Gabriella Papadakis, later criticized his continued support of Sørensen in her memoir, revealing that his refusal to end their friendship was the reason she, a fellow sexual assault survivor, decided to stop skating with him.

The new team made their competitive debut in August 2025, winning gold at the French competition Masters de Villard-de-Lans. They subsequently withdrew from 2025 CS Nebelhorn Trophy, scheduled for late September, due to a change in their rhythm dance music that required adjustments to the program.

Fournier Beaudry and Cizeron debuted their new rhythm dance, along with their free dance, at their first international competition, 2025 Grand Prix de France. They secured gold despite a mistake from Cizeron in the final element of their rhythm dance, edging out their competitors Fear/Gibson and sending out a strong message to the field. They were particularly pleased with their free dance performance, stating "It's the kind of performance that we train and live for, and it's the feelings that we missed." "Today we came to the ice without any number in mind," said Fournier Beaudry after the free dance. "We came here to enjoy the moment, to celebrate that we are skating here together, and to remember why we are here."

The following month, Fournier Beaudry was granted French citizenship, making her eligible for the 2026 Olympics. They then took their second consecutive Grand Prix gold at 2025 Finlandia Trophy after placing first in both the Rhythm and free dance. "This is our first competition outside of France," said Cizeron after the free dance. "We feel very lucky to be sharing those moments together. We are very pleased with our performances this weekend. We have been working a lot on both programs, and we had so much fun today sharing that with the public."

In December, Fournier Beaudry and Cizeron took the silver at the 2025-26 Grand Prix Final behind Madison Chock and Evan Bates in their debut as a team at this event. They placed second in both the rhythm dance and free dance, picking up a new personal best in the latter. "I think we're really proud to have made it so far," said Cizeron. "I think we've overcome so many challenges and I'm really proud of us for the performances that we've put here. And this week was really particularly enjoyable in this amazing venue, and with the crowd and the energy was really fun."

The following month, Fournier Beaudry and Cizeron won the title at the 2026 European Figure Skating Championships with over 12 points to spare in their debut at this event as a team. "It felt really incredible!" said Cizeron. "The crowd was amazing! It was such a warm event; I was not expecting to have such a warm welcome, but it was amazing and we couldn't be happier with the performance."

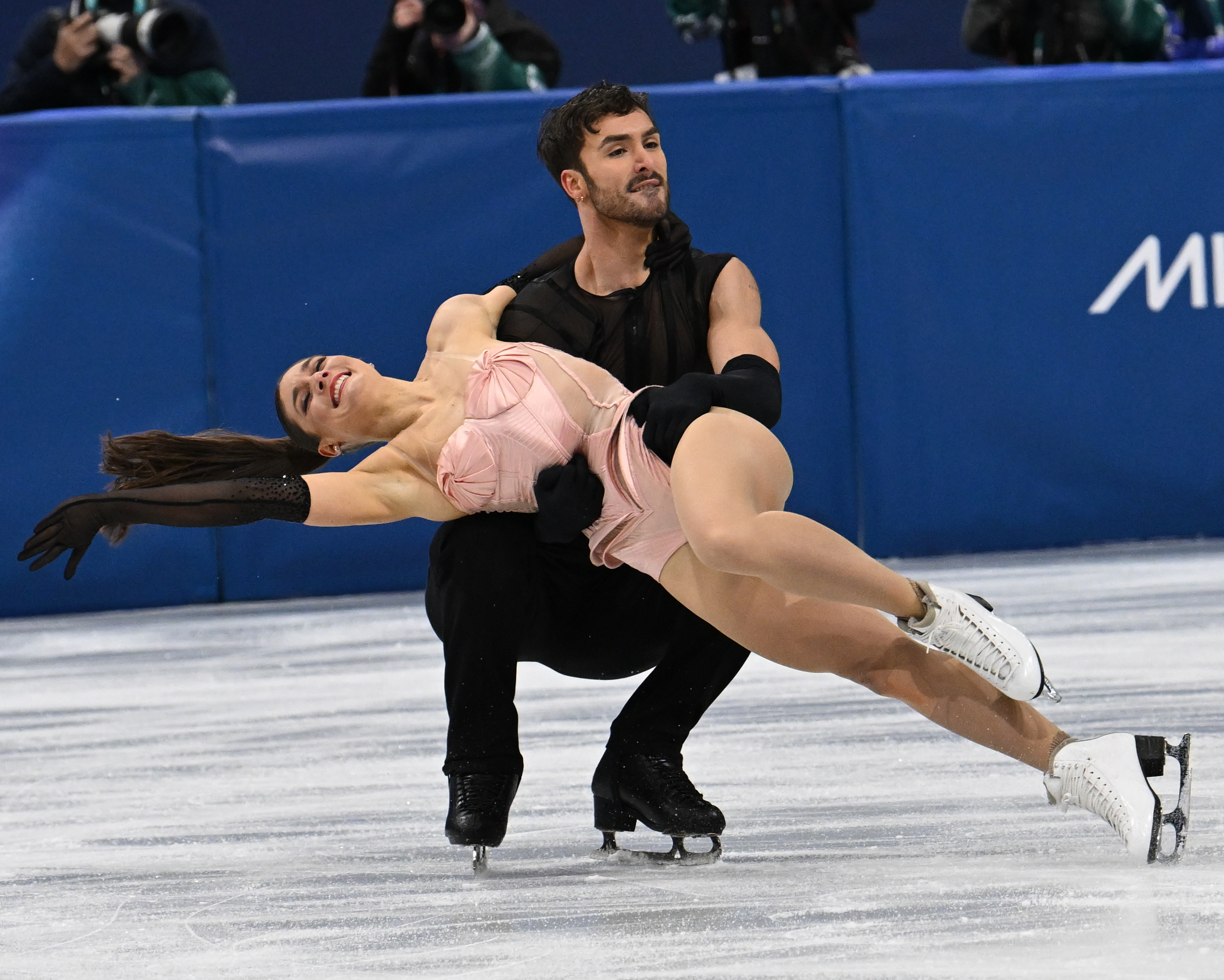
Fournier Beaudry and Cizeron performing their rhythm dance at the 2026 Winter Olympics

On February 6, Fournier Beaudry and Cizeron placed second with a new personal best score of 89.98 in the rhythm dance at the 2026 Winter Olympics Figure Skating Team Event. "We are just very happy to be stepping on the Olympic ice today. It felt very special," said Cizeron. "It's our first time doing the team event, so it was a very special experience hearing the crowds, seeing the rings, and you know, everything—this is everything we dream of as athletes. So, we are trying to grasp every moment." That same day, the woman that accused Sørensen of sexual assault made a statement to The Canadian Press: "The comments of the reigning Olympic champion and a team in contention for the upcoming Olympic title carry weight, and using their voices to publicly undermine a survivor's truths further enforces the culture of silence in figure skating."

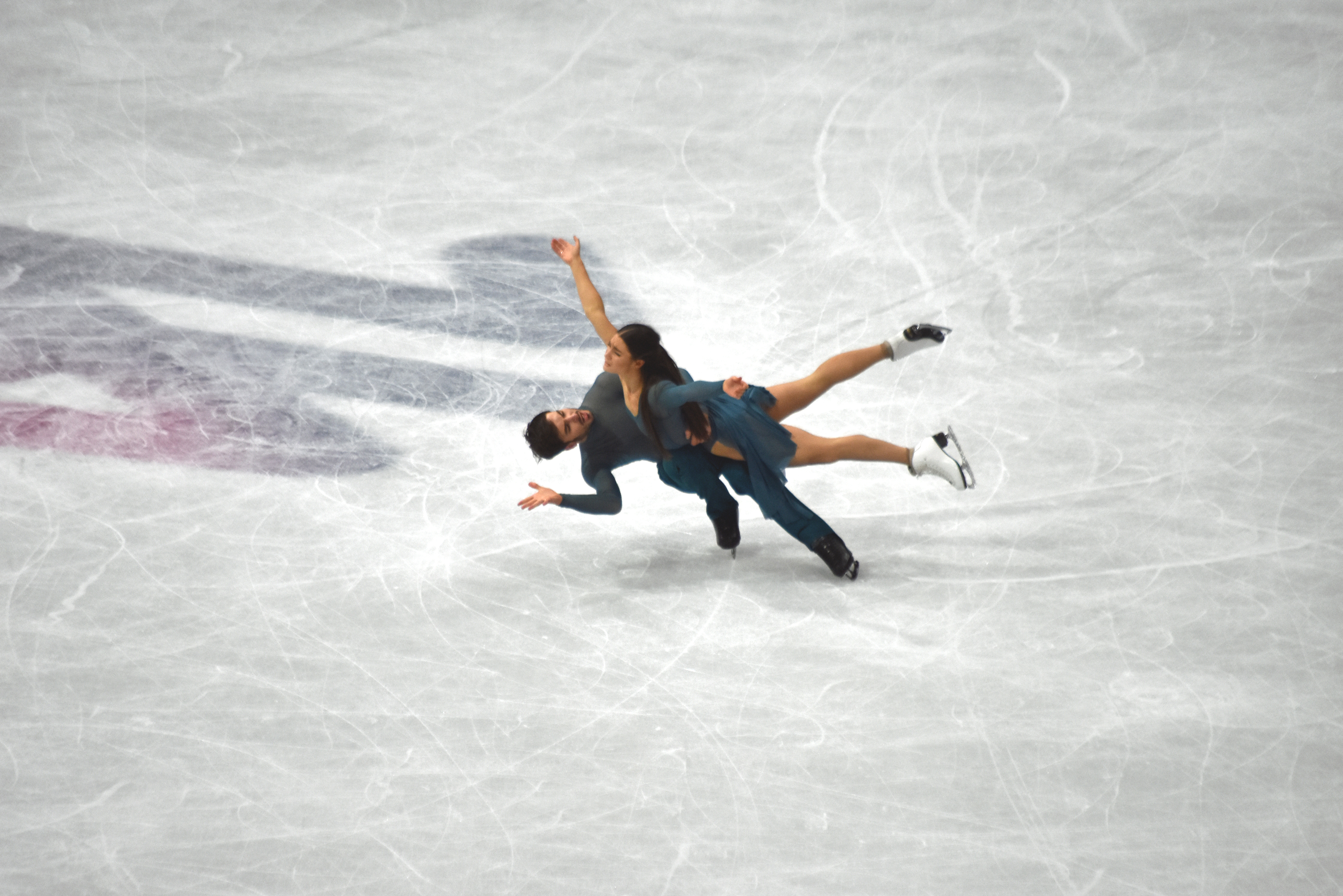
Laurence Fournier Baudry & Guillaume Cizeron performing their free dance at the 2026 Winter Olympics

Five days later, Fournier Beaudry and Cizeron won the gold medal in the 2026 Winter Olympic Ice Dance event after placing first in both segments, edging out gold medal favourites, Madison Chock and Evan Bates. "Oh my God, we are still in shock!" said Cizeron. "We had such a special time on the ice today. Looking back a year ago when we started dreaming of this, it's incredible what we've been through—all the work, all the training, and all the support we got along the way."

In March 2026, Fournier Beaudry and Cizeron competed in the 2026 World Figure Skating Championships. They placed first in the rhythm dance with a personal best score of 92.74, putting them in the lead by just over 5 points going into the free dance. "After the Olympics, we had a lot of media in Paris, so we spent some time there," said Cizeron. "We came back home, rested a little…we were a bit sick for a week. Then we started training again, went to Lithuania for a show, and really enjoyed it there. It was a very good preparation. And then we trained at home for Worlds." Two days later, they earned two more up another personal best scores in both the free dance and total score (138.07/230.81) to win the event. "We really had a good time tonight," said Fournier Beaudry. "It was a really magical moment. We really felt the energy of the crowd. They were really warm and it felt like a celebration of a long and beautiful season for us. We are just really grateful."

==== 2026–27 season ====
Fournier Beaudry and Cizeron opened their season with a win at 2026 Grand Prix de France. Cizeron had commented that last season "flew by." “We only had a little taste of our partnership. We wanted more, so we decided to keep going,” he confirmed. “We had a great first season, and we want to continue sharing the ice and having fun together.”

The following month, Fournier Beaudry and Cizeron took their second consecutive Grand Prix gold of the season at 2026 Finlandia Trophy. As a result the team qualified for the 2026–27 Grand Prix of Figure Skating Final. “We’re heading home for two days off to recover and reset before starting some intensive training for the Grand Prix Final,” said Fournier Beaudry. “It’s coming up very soon. From there, we’ll go straight to Elite de France, our national championships.”

== Career as a choreographer ==
Following the 2021–22 Olympic season, Cizeron began regularly working as a choreographer for several skaters. His clients have included:

- (Japan) Mone Chiba
- (Italy) Corey Circelli
- (South Korea) Cha Jun-hwan
- (Canada) Liubov Ilyushechkina / Charlie Bilodeau
- (France) Vanessa James / Morgan Ciprès
- (Canada) Vanessa James / Eric Radford
- (Japan) Haru Kakiuchi
- (Monaco) Davide Lewton Brain
- (France) Evgenia Lopareva / Geoffrey Brissaud
- (Estonia) Solène Mazingue / Marko Jevgeni Gaidajenko
- (France) Océane Piegad / Denys Strekalin
- (Japan) Shun Sato

== World record scores ==
Combined total records
Date	Score	Event	Note
26 March 2022	229.82	2022 World Championships	Broken later by Chock/Bates
14 February 2022	226.98	2022 Winter Olympics	
23 November 2019	226.61	2019 NHK Trophy	
12 April 2019	223.13	2019 ISU World Team Trophy in Figure Skating	
23 March 2019	222.65	2019 World Championships	
26 January 2019	217.98	2019 European Championships	
24 November 2018	216.78	2018 Internationaux de France	Papadakis/Cizeron became the first ever time to score a combined total of over 210.
24 March 2018	207.20	2018 World Championships	Historical world record.
20 February 2018	205.28	2018 Winter Olympics	Surpassed in the same competition by Virtue/Moir.
20 January 2018	203.16	2018 European Championships	
9 December 2017	202.16	2017–18 Grand Prix of Figure Skating Final	
18 November 2017	201.98	2017 Internationaux de France	
4 November 2017	200.43	2017 Cup of China	Papadakis/Cizeron became the first team ever to score above 200 points.

Free dance records
Date	Score	Event	Note
26 March 2022	137.09	2022 World Championships	Broken later by Chock/Bates
12 April 2019	136.58	2019 NHK Trophy	
12 April 2019	135.82	2019 ISU World Team Trophy in Figure Skating	
23 March 2019	134.23	2019 World Championships	
26 January 2019	133.19	2019 European Championships	
24 November 2018	132.65	2018 Internationaux de France	Papadakis/Cizeron became the first-ever team to score over 130 in the free dance.
24 March 2018	123.47	2018 World Championships	Historical world record.
20 February 2018	123.35	2018 Winter Olympics	
20 January 2018	121.87	2018 European Championships	
18 November 2017	120.58	2017 Internationaux de France	Papadakis/Cizeron became the first team to score above 120 points in the free dance.
4 November 2017	119.33	2017 Cup of China	
1 April 2017	119.15	2017 World Championships	
31 March 2016	118.17	2016 World Championships	

Short dance records
Date	Score	Event	Note
25 March 2022	92.73	2022 World Championships	Broken later by Chock/Bates
12 February 2022	90.83	2022 Winter Olympics	
22 November 2019	90.03	2019 NHK Trophy	They became the first couple to break the 90-point barrier.
1 November 2019	88.69	2019 Internationaux de France	
22 March 2019	88.42	2019 World Championships	
25 January 2019	84.79	2019 European Championships	
23 November 2018	84.13	2018 Internationaux de France	
23 March 2018	83.73	2018 World Championships	Historical world record.

== Programs ==
=== With Laurence Fournier Beaudry ===
Season	Rhythm dance	Free dance	Exhibition
2026–2027	Malamente; El Redentor; De Madruga; La rumba del Perdon by Rosalia	They Will Shade Us with Their Wings; This Bitter Earth by Dinah Washington, Max Richter	Metamorphosis; Mad Rush composed by Philip Glass
2025–2026	Vogue (Bette Davis Dub); Rescue Me (Houseboat Vocal Mix); Vogue (Strike-A-Pose Dub); Vogue by Madonna & Shep Pettibone choreo. by Marie-France Dubreuil, Romain Haguenauer; Enjoy the Silence (The 12" Singles); Personal Jesus (Alex Metric Remix) by Depeche Mode choreo. by Marie-France Dubreuil, Romain Haguenauer, Samuel Chouinard, Ginette Cournoyer	The Whale; Opening; Rigging; Deep Water; Safe Return by Hugh Brunt & Rob Simonsen choreo. by Marie-France Dubreuil, Romain Haguenauer, Stéphane Lambiel	Metamorphosis; Mad Rush composed by Philip Glass

=== With Gabriella Papadakis ===
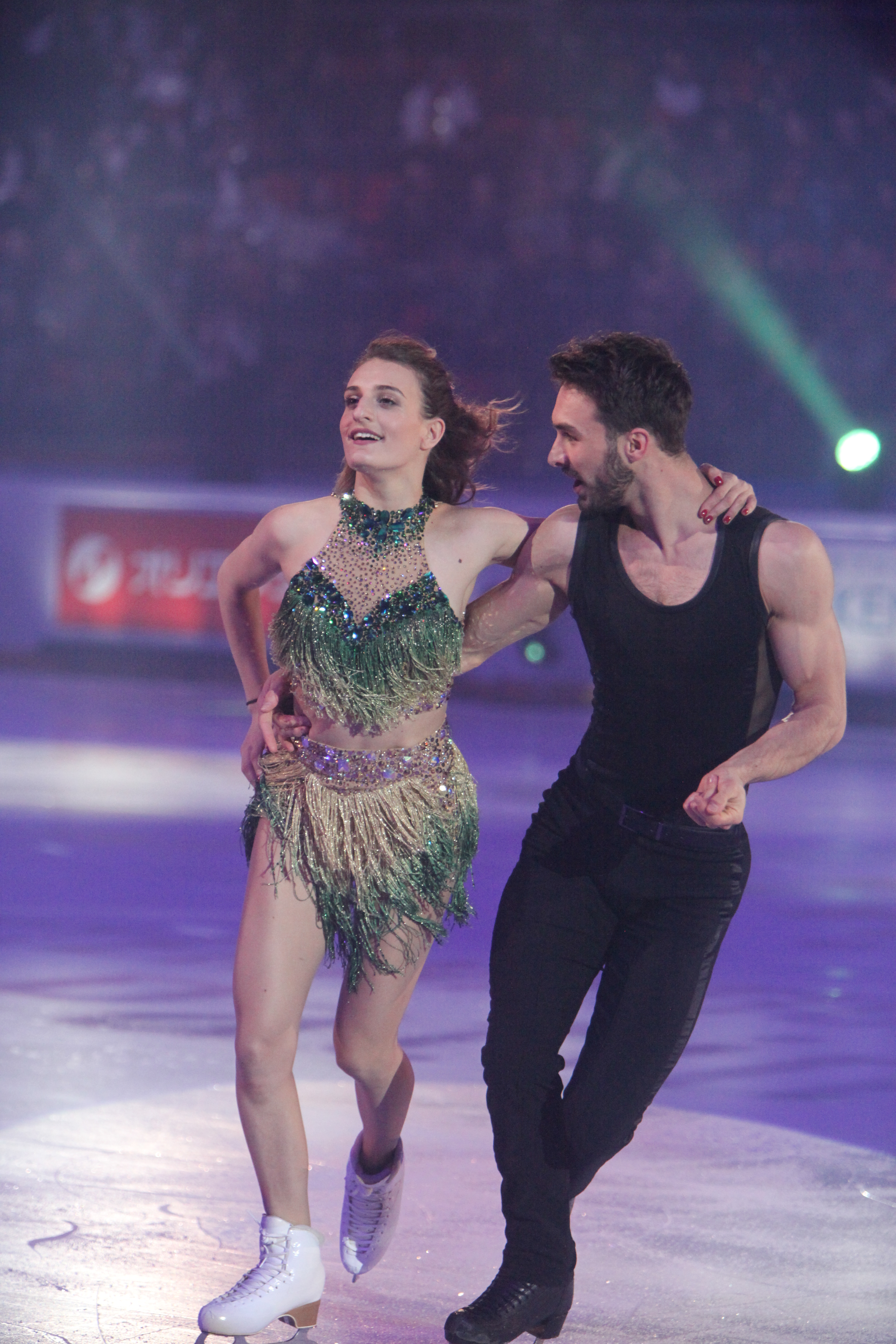
Papadakis/Cizeron at the 2018 European Championships

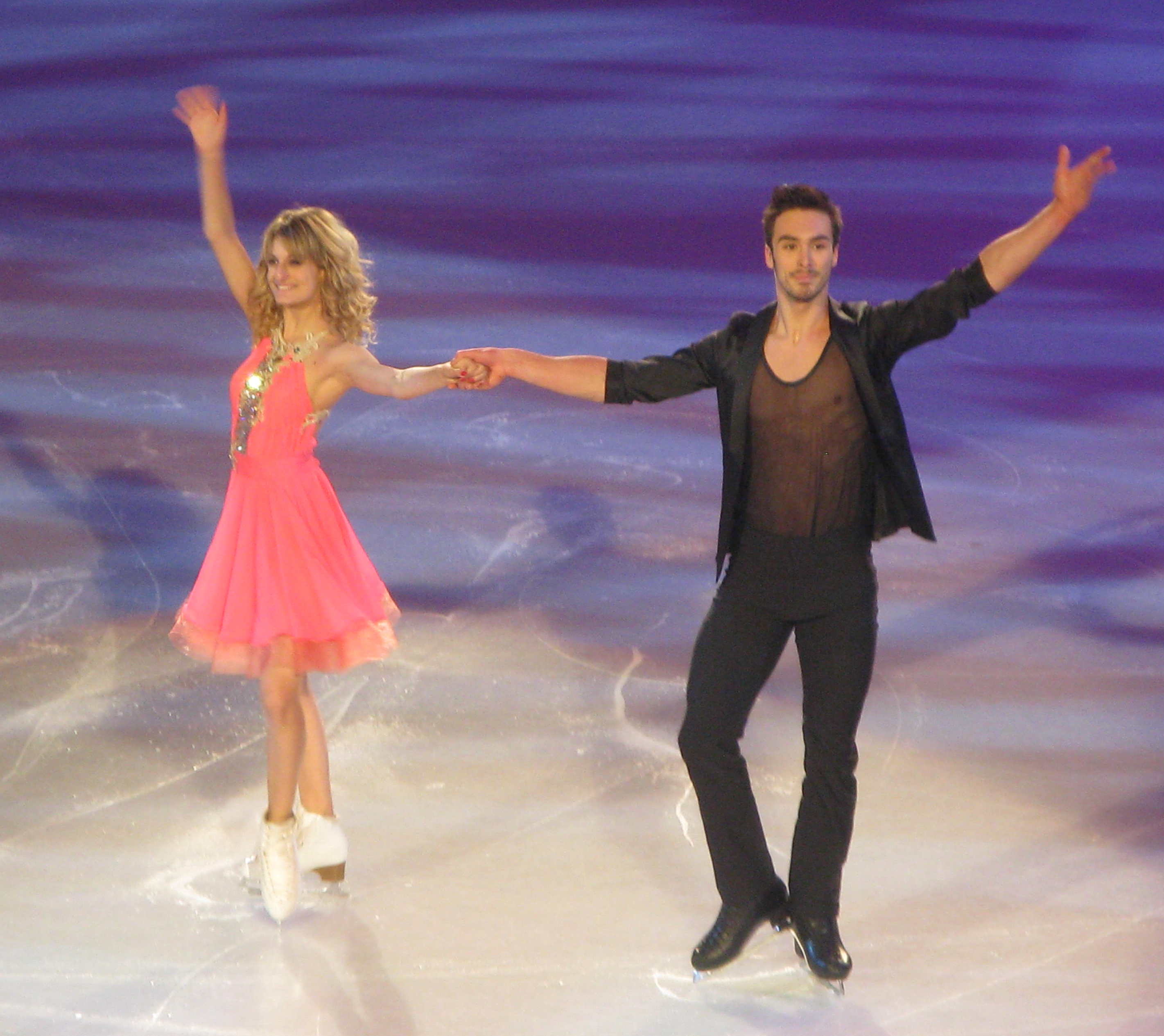
Papadakis/Cizeron at the 2013 Trophée Éric Bompard

"Short dance" was renamed as "rhythm dance" from the 2018-2019 season.

Season	Rhythm dance	Free dance	Exhibition
2021–2022	Hip Hop: Made to Love; Blues: U Move, I Move by John Legend choreo. by Axelle Munezero & Kim Gingras & Samuel Chouinard & Marie-France Dubreuil; Hip Hop: Made to Love; Blues: You & I by John Legend choreo. by Axelle Munezero & Kim Gingras & Samuel Chouinard & Marie-France Dubreuil	Élégie (tango) by Gabriel Fauré choreo. by Saxon Fraser & Marie-France Dubreuil	Avec le temps by Léo Ferré
2020–2021	The Artist by Ludovic Bource	Jalousie 'Tango Tzigane' by Jacob Gade	
2019–2020	Disco: I Can Do Anything Better Than You Can by S. Linzer & D. Wolfert arranged by Maxime Rodriguez; Blues: Fame by Michael Gore, Dean Pitchford arranged by Maxime Rodriguez and Ludivine Amado; Disco: Fame by Michael Gore, Dean Pitchford performed by Irene Cara (from Fame) choreo. by Romain Haguenauer & Samuel Chouinard	Danny by Ólafur Arnalds; Find Me by Forest Blakk; Suspects by Ólafur Arnalds choreo. by Marie-France Dubreuil & Samuel Chouinard	For Island Fires and Family; Power Over Me by Dermot Kennedy
2018–2019	Tango: Oblivion by Astor Piazzolla performed by Gidon Kremer; Primavera Porteña by Astor Piazzolla performed by Gidon Kremer choreo. by Christopher Dean	Duet by Rachael Yamagata, Ray LaMontagne; Sunday Afternoon by Rachael Yamagata choreo. by Stéphane Lambiel, Marie-France Dubreuil	Shape of You; Thinking Out Loud by Ed Sheeran remastered by Karl Hugo choreo. by Christopher Dean; For Island Fires and Family; Power Over Me by Dermot Kennedy
2017–2018	Shape of You; Thinking Out Loud by Ed Sheeran remastered by Karl Hugo choreo. by Christopher Dean	Moonlight Sonata by Ludwig van Beethoven choreo. by Marie-France Dubreuil; Adagio sostenuto performed by Steve Anderson; Presto agitato	Gravity by John Mayer; Shape of You; Thinking Out Loud by Ed Sheeran remastered by Karl Hugo choreo. by Christopher Dean; To Build a Home (gala version) by The Cinematic Orchestra; Pray You Catch Me by Beyoncé
2016–2017	Blues: Bittersweet by Rene Liebau, Maxim Illion perf. by Club des Belugas; Swing: Diga Diga Doo by Dorothy Fields, Jimmy McHugh perf. by Big Bad Voodoo Daddy	Stillness by Nest; Oddudua by Aldo Lopez Gavilan; Happiness Does Not Wait by Ólafur Arnalds	Belvedere by James Gruntz choreo. by Samuel Chouinard
2015–2016	Waltz: Charms (from W.E.) by Abel Korzeniowski; March: Composition by Karl Hugo; Waltz and March: Charms (from W.E.) by Abel Korzeniowski	Rain, In Your Black Eyes by Ezio Bosso; To Build a Home by The Cinematic Orchestra	DKLA by Troye Sivan; Can't Feel My Face by The Weeknd choreo. by Samuel Chouinard; Belvedere by James Gruntz choreo. by Samuel Chouinard; Adagio from Concerto No. 23 by Wolfgang Amadeus Mozart
2014–2015	Paso doble: Escobilla; Flamenco: Farruca by Cristina Hoyos	Adagio from Concerto No. 23 by Wolfgang Amadeus Mozart	Take Me to Church by Hozier; À Distance by Sylvain Cossette; All by Myself performed by Celine Dion; Sway by Luis Demetrio
2013–2014	Quickstep: Cool Cat in Town by Tape Five; Foxtrot: Burlesque	Iron; Run Boy Run by Woodkid; Brotsjor by Ólafur Arnalds	Million Dollar Man by Lana Del Rey; Déshabillez-moi
2012–2013	Blues: Minnie the Moocher; The Dirty Boogie	Money; Hey You by Pink Floyd	Million Dollar Man by Lana Del Rey
2011–2012	Rumba: Mondo Bongo by Joe Strummer & The Mescaleros; Cha Cha: Oye Cómo Va by Celia Cruz	Elvis Presley medley: Jailhouse Rock; So Glad You're Mine; Blue Suede Shoes	Je dois m'en aller by Niagara
2010–2011	Waltz: C'était Salement Romantique by Cœur de pirate	A Fuego Lento by Horacio Salgan; Rapsodia de Anabal by José Libatella	

== Competitive highlights ==
- GP – Event of the ISU Grand Prix Series
- CS – Event of the ISU Challenger Series
- JGP – Event of the ISU Junior Grand Prix Series
- Medals at team events are awarded for the team results only. Individual placements at team events are listed in parentheses.

=== Ice dance with Laurence Fournier Beaudry ===
Competition placements at senior level
Season	2025–26	2026-27
Winter Olympics	1st	
Winter Olympics (Team event)	6th	
World Championships	1st	
European Championships	1st	
French Championships	1st	
Grand Prix Final	2nd	TBD
GP Finland	1st	1st
GP France	1st	1st
Master's de Patinage	1st	

=== Ice dance with Papadakis ===
==== 2013–14 to 2021–22 ====
International
Event	13–14	14–15	15–16	16–17	17–18	18–19	19–20	20–21	21–22
Olympics					2nd				1st
Worlds	13th	1st	1st	2nd	1st	1st	C	WD	1st
Europeans	15th	1st	1st	1st	1st	1st	2nd		WD
GP Final		3rd		2nd	1st		1st		C
GP Cup of China		1st			1st				C
GP France	5th	1st	WD	1st	1st	1st	1st	C	1st
GP Italy									1st
GP NHK Trophy			WD	2nd		WD	1st		
GP Rostelecom	7th								
CS Autumn Classic		1st							WD
CS Finlandia					1st				1st
Cup of Nice	1st								
Golden Spin	4th								
National
French Champ.	2nd	1st	1st	1st	1st	1st	1st	WD	1st
Masters	3rd	1st		1st	1st		1st		
Team events
World Team Trophy		6th T 2nd P				4th T 1st P			

==== 2007–08 to 2012–13 ====
International: Junior
Event	09–10	10–11	11–12	12–13
Junior Worlds	22nd	12th	5th	2nd
JGP Final				2nd
JGP Austria		3rd		1st
JGP Estonia			4th	
JGP France		4th		1st
JGP Poland			4th	
JGP USA	15th			
NRW Trophy				2nd J
Trophy of Lyon		1st J	1st J	1st J
Santa Claus Cup			2nd	
National: Junior or Novice
French Junior	1st J	1st J		1st J
Masters	WD	1st J	1st J	1st J

== Detailed results ==
Small medals for short and free programs awarded only at ISU Championships. At team events, medals awarded for team results only.

=== Ice dance with Laurence Fournier Beaudry ===
ISU personal best scores in the +5/-5 GOE System
Segment	Type	Score	Event
Total	TSS	230.81	2026 World Championships
Rhythm dance	TSS	92.74	2026 World Championships
Rhythm dance	TES	54.12	2026 World Championships
Rhythm dance	PCS	38.62	2026 World Championships
Free dance	TSS	138.07	2026 World Championships
Free dance	TES	78.85	2026 World Championships
Free dance	PCS	59.22	2026 World Championships

Results in the 2025-26 season
Date	Event	RD		FD		Total	
Date	Event	P	Score	P	Score	P	Score
Aug 28-30, 2025	(France) 2025 Master's de Patinage	1	88.54	1	130.53	1	219.07
Oct 17-19, 2025	2025 Grand Prix de France	3	78.00	1	133.02	1	211.02
Nov 21-22, 2025	(Finland) 2025 Finlandia Trophy	1	79.89	1	124.29	1	204.18
Dec 4–7, 2025	(Japan) 2025–26 Grand Prix Final	2	87.56	2	126.69	2	214.25
Dec 18-20, 2025	(France) 2026 French Championships	1	94.31	1	139.39	1	233.70
Jan 13-18, 2026	(United Kingdom) 2026 European Championships	1	86.93	1	135.50	1	222.43
Feb 6–8, 2026	(Italy) 2026 Winter Olympics (Team event)	2	89.98	—N/a	—N/a	6	—N/a
Feb 6–19, 2026	(Italy) 2026 Winter Olympics	1	90.18	1	135.64	1	225.82
Mar 24–29, 2026	(Czech Republic) 2026 World Championships	1	92.74	1	138.07	1	230.81

Results in the 2026-27 season
Date	Event	RD		FD		Total	
Date	Event	P	Score	P	Score	P	Score
Oct 23-25, 2026	2026 Grand Prix de France	1	82.56	1	125.01	1	207.57

=== Ice dance with Gabriella Papadakis ===
ISU personal best scores in the +5/-5 GOE System
Segment	Type	Score	Event
Total	TSS	229.82	2022 World Championships
Rhythm dance	TSS	92.73	2022 World Championships
Rhythm dance	TES	53.16	2022 World Championships
Rhythm dance	PCS	39.57	2022 World Championships
Free dance	TSS	137.09	2022 World Championships
Free dance	TES	77.40	2019 NHK Trophy
Free dance	PCS	59.70	2022 World Championships

ISU personal bests in the +3/-3 GOE System (from 2010–11)
Segment	Type	Score	Event
Total	TSS	207.20	2018 World Championships
Short dance	TSS	83.73	2018 World Championships
Short dance	TES	44.37	2018 World Championships
Short dance	PCS	39.36	2018 World Championships
Free dance	TSS	123.47	2018 World Championships
Free dance	TES	63.98	2018 Winter Olympics
Free dance	PCS	59.53	2018 World Championships

=== Senior career ===
Record in 2017-2018 Season marks the historical world records set before the introduction of the +5/-5 GOE judging system

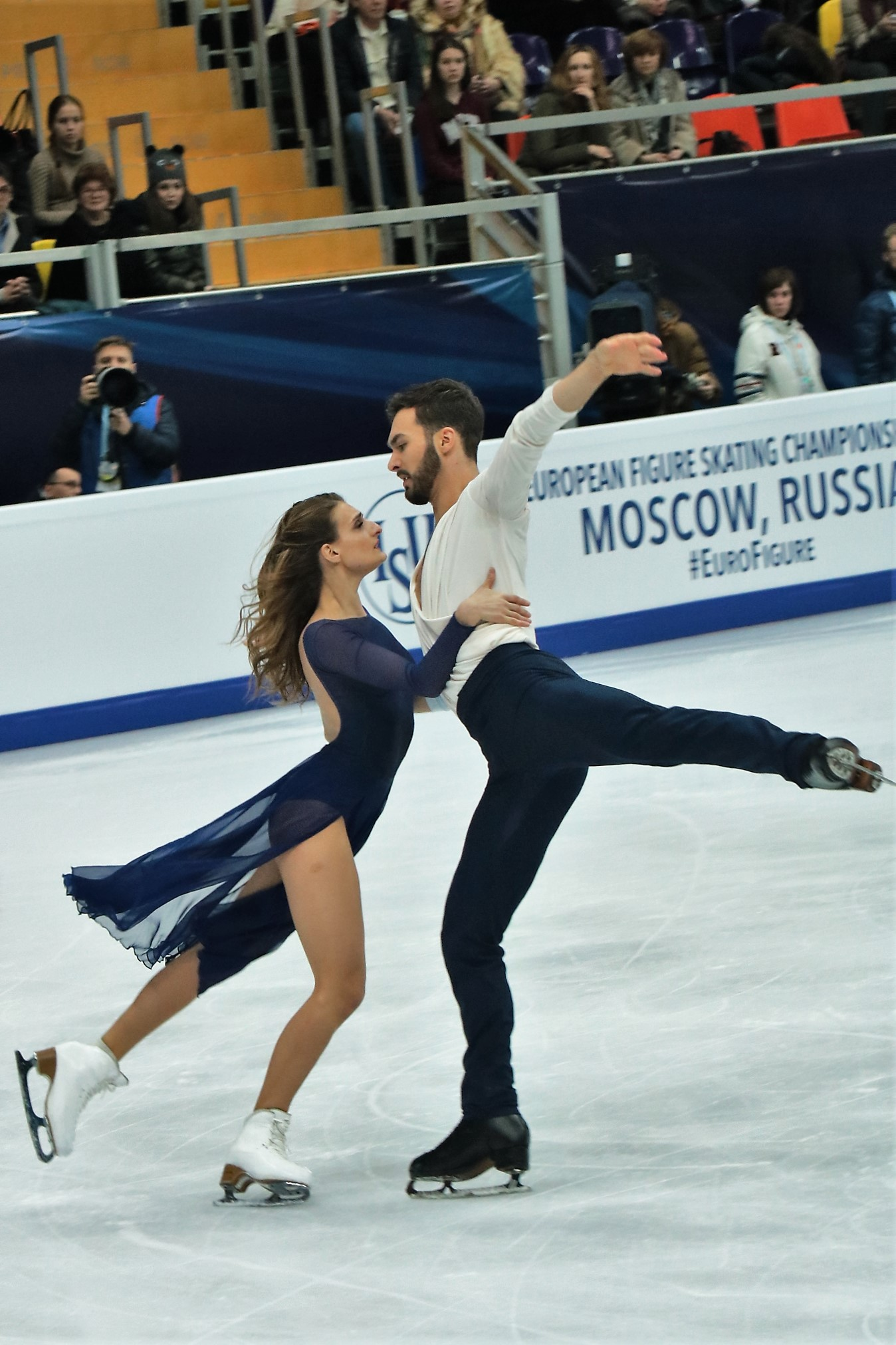
Papadakis/Cizeron at the 2018 European Championships

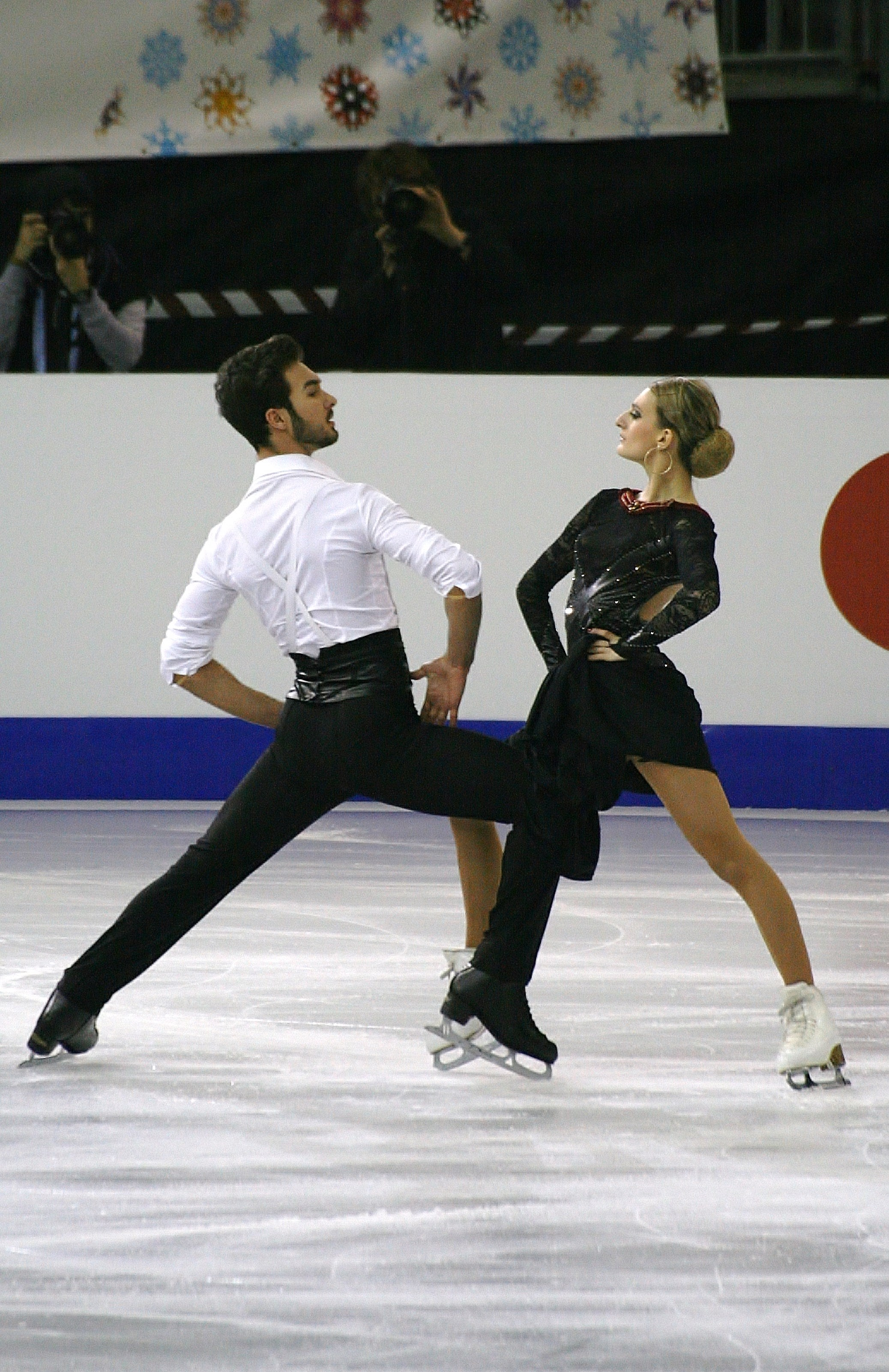
Papadakis/Cizeron at the 2014–15 Grand Prix Final

2021–22 season
Date	Event	RD	FD	Total
21–27 March 2022	2022 World Championships	1; 92.73	1; 137.09	1; 229.82
12–14 February 2022	2022 Winter Olympics	1; 90.83	1; 136.15	1; 226.98
16–18 December 2021	2022 French Championships	1; 94.48	1; 132.48	1; 226.96
19–21 November 2021	2021 Internationaux de France	1; 89.08	1; 132.17	1; 221.25
5–7 November 2021	2021 Gran Premio d'Italia	1; 87.45	1; 132.61	1; 220.06
7–10 October 2021	2021 CS Finlandia Trophy	1; 85.58	1; 131.96	1; 217.54
2019–20 season
Date	Event	RD	FD	Total
20–26 January 2020	2020 European Championships	1; 88.78	2; 131.50	2; 220.28
19–21 December 2019	2020 French Championships	1; 91.85	1; 137.22	1; 229.07
5–8 December 2019	2019–20 Grand Prix Final	1; 83.83	1; 136.02	1; 219.85
22–24 November 2019	2019 NHK Trophy	1; 90.03	1; 136.58	1; 226.61
1–3 November 2019	2019 Internationaux de France	1; 88.69	1; 133.55	1; 222.24
2018–19 season
Date	Event	RD	FD	Total
11–14 April 2019	2019 World Team Trophy	1; 87.31	1; 135.82	4T/1P; 223.13
22–23 March 2019	2019 World Championships	1; 88.42	1; 134.23	1; 222.65
21–27 January 2019	2019 European Championships	1; 84.79	1; 133.19	1; 217.98
13–15 December 2018	2019 French Championships	1; 85.89	1; 135.06	1; 220.95
23–25 November 2018	2018 Internationaux de France	1; 84.13	1; 132.65	1; 216.78
2017–18 season
Date	Event	SD	FD	Total
19–25 March 2018	2018 World Championships	1; 83.73	1; 123.47	1; 207.20
19–20 February 2018	2018 Winter Olympics	2; 81.93	1; 123.35	2; 205.28
15–21 January 2018	2018 European Championships	1; 81.29	1; 121.87	1; 203.16
14–16 December 2017	2018 French Championships	1; 79.01	1; 123.10	1; 202.11
7–10 December 2017	2017–18 Grand Prix Final	1; 82.07	1; 120.09	1; 202.16
17–19 November 2017	2017 Internationaux de France	1; 81.40	1; 120.58	1; 201.98
3–5 November 2017	2017 Cup of China	1; 81.10	1; 119.33	1; 200.43
6–8 October 2017	2017 CS Finlandia Trophy	1; 78.09	1; 110.16	1; 188.25
2016–17 season
Date	Event	SD	FD	Total
29 Mar. – 2 Apr. 2017	2017 World Championships	2; 76.89	1; 119.15	2; 196.04
25–29 January 2017	2017 European Championships	3; 75.48	1; 114.19	1; 189.67
15–17 December 2016	2017 French Championships	1; 82.03	1; 120.60	1; 202.63
8–11 December 2016	2016–17 Grand Prix Final	3; 77.86	2; 114.95	2; 192.81
25–27 November 2016	2016 NHK Trophy	2; 75.60	2; 111.06	2; 186.66
11–13 November 2016	2016 Trophée de France	1; 78.26	1; 115.24	1; 193.40
2015–16 season
Date	Event	SD	FD	Total
28 Mar. – 3 Apr. 2016	2016 World Championships	1; 76.29	1; 118.17	1; 194.46
26–31 January 2016	2016 European Championships	2; 70.74	1; 111.97	1; 182.71
17–19 December 2015	2016 French Championships	1; 73.60	1; 110.30	1; 183.90
2014–15 season
Date	Event	SD	FD	Total
16–19 April 2015	2015 World Team Trophy	3; 70.86	1; 111.06	6T/2P; 181.92
23–29 March 2015	2015 World Championships	4; 71.94	1; 112.34	1; 184.28
26 Jan. – 1 Feb. 2015	2015 European Championships	1; 71.06	1; 108.91	1; 179.97
18–21 December 2014	2015 French Championships	1; 71.40	1; 109.83	1; 181.23
11–14 December 2014	2014–15 Grand Prix Final	5; 61.48	3; 100.91	3; 162.39
21–23 November 2014	2014 Trophée Éric Bompard	1; 64.06	1; 102.60	1; 166.06
7–9 November 2014	2014 Cup of China	3; 62.12	1; 98.00	1; 160.12
15–16 October 2014	2014 SC Autumn Classic	1; 59.74	1; 90.46	1; 150.60
2013–14 season
Date	Event	SD	FD	Total
24–30 March 2014	2014 World Championships	15; 55.11	13; 86.38	13; 141.49
13–19 January 2014	2014 European Championships	15; 53.33	14; 78.24	15; 131.57
12–15 December 2014	2014 French Championships	2; 61.79	2; 92.45	2; 154.24
5–8 December 2014	2013 Golden Spin of Zagreb	4; 53.08	4; 81.52	4; 134.60
22–24 November 2013	2013 Rostelecom Cup	8; 44.49	7; 79.78	7; 124.27
15–17 November 2013	2013 Trophée Éric Bompard	5; 58.10	5; 85.16	5; 143.26
23–27 October 2013	2013 Cup of Nice	1; 60.05	1; 87.88	1; 147.93

=== Junior career ===
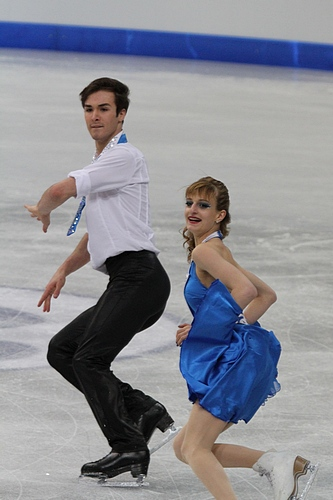
Papadakis/Cizeron at the 2012 World Junior Championships

2012–13 season
Date	Event	SD	FD	Total
27 Feb. – 3 Mar. 2013	2013 World Junior Championships	2; 61.58	3; 81.68	2; 143.26
11–13 January 2013	2012 Trophy of Lyon	1; 61.62	1; 82.71	1; 144.33
6–9 December 2012	2012 JGP Final	2; 54.79	2; 84.42	2; 139.21
2–4 November 2012	2012 NRW Trophy	2; 58.36	1; 87.00	2; 145.36
13–14 September 2012	2012 JGP Austria	1; 59.19	1; 82.89	1; 142.08
24–25 August 2012	2012 JGP France	2; 52.25	1; 78.88	1; 131.13
2011–12 season
Date	Event	SD	FD	Total
27 Feb. – 4 Mar. 2012	2012 World Junior Championships	4; 58.09	5; 80.61	5; 138.70
12–15 October 2011	2011 JGP Estonia	5; 49.89	3; 72.90	5; 122.79
14–17 September 2011	2011 JGP Poland	3; 52.13	5; 68.69	5; 120.82
2010–11 season
Date	Event	SD	FD	Total
28 Feb. – 6 Mar. 2011	2011 World Junior Championships	15; 43.97	9; 71.59	12; 115.56
14–17 September 2011	2010 JGP Austria	3; 49.93	5; 65.21	3; 115.14
25–28 August 2010	2010 JGP France	4; 43.89	2; 63.40	4; 107.29
