= Charmed: The Soundtrack =

Soundtrack album by various artists
- Released: September 22, 2003
- Genre: Pop rock
- Length: 41:07
- Labels: BMG; Private Music; RCA

Charmed: The Soundtrack is the first soundtrack album of the television series Charmed, which aired on The WB in the United States. It features music from the show's first five seasons and was released on September 23, 2003, by BMG Music.

== Background and release ==
Charmed: The Soundtrack was executive produced by Harry Brainerd, Jonathan Platt and Jonathan Scott Miller. It also includes Charmed's theme song, a cover of The Smiths 1985 song "How Soon Is Now?" by Love Spit Love. The album was released as a CD in the United States on September 23, 2003, and in the United Kingdom on September 29, 2003.

Johnny Loftus of AllMusic gave Charmed: The Soundtrack three stars out of five and wrote that it "is just a milky collection of light modern rock from a mixture of heavyweights and hopefuls." Loftus also noted that "the real standout" on the soundtrack is Rachael Yamagata's song "Worn Me Down". On October 11, 2003, Charmed: The Soundtrack debuted at number 177 on the US Billboard 200 chart and number 10 on the US Billboard Top Soundtracks chart.

== Track listing ==
No.	Title	Artist(s)	Length
1.	"Hot"	Smash Mouth	2:31
2.	"Danger"	Third Eye Blind	3:11
3.	"Strict Machine"	Goldfrapp	3:50
4.	"Maybe Tomorrow"	Stereophonics	4:33
5.	"Rinse"	Vanessa Carlton	4:29
6.	"I Can't Take It"	Andy Stochansky	2:50
7.	"Worn Me Down"	Rachael Yamagata	4:32
8.	"Do You Realize??"	The Flaming Lips	3:31
9.	"New Favorite Thing"	Balligomingo featuring Lucy Woodward	3:52
10.	"Rainbow in the Sky"	Ziggy Marley	3:06
11.	"How Soon Is Now?"	Love Spit Love	4:25

== Charts ==
Chart (2003)	Peak position
US Billboard 200	177
US Billboard Top Soundtracks	10

== Release history ==
Region	Date	Format	Label	Ref.
United States	September 23, 2003	CD	RCA Records	
United Kingdom	September 29, 2003	CD	BMG Music	
