= 1963 (disambiguation) =

1963 was a common year starting on Tuesday of the Gregorian calendar.

1963 may also refer to:

- "1963" (song), a song by New Order
- "1963", a song on the album Happenstance by Rachael Yamagata
- 1963 (comics), a 1993 comic book limited series
