= 2017 Internationaux de France =

Figure skating competition

- Type: Grand Prix
- Date: November 17 – 19
- Season: 2017–18
- Location: Grenoble
- Host: French Federation of Ice Sports
- Venue: lo

Champions
- Men's singles: (Spain) Javier Fernández
- Ladies' singles: (Russia) Alina Zagitova
- Pairs: (Russia) Evgenia Tarasova / Vladimir Morozov
- Ice dance: (France) Gabriella Papadakis / Guillaume Cizeron
- Previous: 2016 Trophée de France
- Next: 2018 Internationaux de France
- Previous GP: 2017 NHK Trophy
- Next GP: 2017 Skate America

The 2017 Internationaux de France was the 5th event of six in the 2017–18 ISU Grand Prix of Figure Skating, a senior-level international invitational competition series. It was held at Patinoire Polesud in Grenoble on November 17–19. Medals were awarded in the disciplines of men's singles, ladies' singles, pair skating, and ice dance. Skaters earned points toward qualifying for the 2017–18 Grand Prix Final.

== Records ==
The following new ISU best scores were set during this competition:

Event	Component	Skater(s)	Score	Date	Ref
Ice dance	Free dance	(France) Gabriella Papadakis / Guillaume Cizeron	120.58	18 November 2017	
Ice dance	Total score	(France) Gabriella Papadakis / Guillaume Cizeron	201.98	18 November 2017	

== Entries ==
The ISU published the preliminary assignments on May 26, 2017.

Country	Men	Ladies	Pairs	Ice dance
Canada		Kaetlyn Osmond	Liubov Ilyushechkina / Dylan Moscovitch	Kaitlyn Weaver / Andrew Poje
China			Peng Cheng / Jin Yang	
France	Kévin Aymoz; Romain Ponsart	Laurine Lecavelier; Maé-Bérénice Méité	Lola Esbrat / Andrei Novoselov; Vanessa James / Morgan Ciprès	Angélique Abachkina / Louis Thauron; Lorenza Alessandrini / Pierre Souquet; Gabriella Papadakis / Guillaume Cizeron
Georgia	Moris Kvitelashvili			
Germany		Nicole Schott		
United Kingdom			Zoe Jones / Christopher Boyadji	
Israel	Oleksii Bychenko			
Italy			Nicole Della Monica / Matteo Guarise	Charlène Guignard / Marco Fabbri
Japan	Shoma Uno	Mai Mihara; Yuna Shiraiwa		
Kazakhstan	Denis Ten	Elizabet Tursynbayeva		
Poland				Natalia Kaliszek / Maksym Spodyriev
Russia	Alexander Samarin	Maria Sotskova; Elizaveta Tuktamysheva; Alina Zagitova	Evgenia Tarasova / Vladimir Morozov	Alla Loboda / Pavel Drozd; Alexandra Stepanova / Ivan Bukin
Spain	Javier Fernández			
United States	Max Aaron; Vincent Zhou	Polina Edmunds	Marissa Castelli / Mervin Tran	Madison Chock / Evan Bates; Elliana Pogrebinsky / Alex Benoit
Uzbekistan	Misha Ge			

=== Changes to preliminary assignments ===
Discipline	Withdrew		Added		Notes	Ref.
Discipline	Date	Skater(s)	Date	Skater(s)	Notes	Ref.
Pairs	—		September 19	(France) Lola Esbrat / Andrei Novoselov	Host picks	
Ice dance	—		September 19	(France) Lorenza Alessandrini / Pierre Souquet	Host picks	
Ladies	October 13	(United States) Gracie Gold	October 31	(Germany) Nicole Schott	Focus on treatment	
Pairs	October 25	(China) Wang Xuehan / Wang Lei	October 31	(United Kingdom) Zoe Jones / Christopher Boyadji		
Pairs	October 31	(Czech Republic) Anna Dušková / Martin Bidař	November 6	(United States) Marissa Castelli / Mervin Tran	Injury (Dušková)	
Ladies	November 6	(China) Li Zijun	—			
Men	November 10	(France) Chafik Besseghier	—			

== Results ==
=== Men ===
Rank	Name	Nation	Total points	SP		FS	
1	Javier Fernández	Spain	283.71	1	107.86	2	175.85
2	Shoma Uno	Japan	273.32	2	93.92	1	179.40
3	Misha Ge	Uzbekistan	258.34	6	85.41	3	172.93
4	Alexander Samarin	Russia	253.13	3	91.51	4	161.62
5	Oleksii Bychenko	Israel	247.44	5	86.79	5	160.65
6	Moris Kvitelashvili	Georgia	240.50	4	86.98	8	153.52
7	Max Aaron	United States	237.20	8	78.64	6	158.56
8	Denis Ten	Kazakhstan	228.57	7	83.70	10	144.87
9	Vincent Zhou	United States	222.21	10	66.12	7	156.09
10	Kévin Aymoz	France	220.43	9	70.00	9	150.43
11	Romain Ponsart	France	198.12	11	63.81	11	134.31

=== Ladies ===
Rank	Name	Nation	Total points	SP		FS	
1	Alina Zagitova	Russia	213.80	5	62.46	1	151.34
2	Maria Sotskova	Russia	208.78	2	67.79	2	140.99
3	Kaetlyn Osmond	Canada	206.77	1	69.05	4	137.72
4	Mai Mihara	Japan	202.12	4	64.57	5	137.55
5	Elizabet Tursynbayeva	Kazakhstan	200.98	6	62.29	3	138.69
6	Yuna Shiraiwa	Japan	193.18	3	66.05	6	127.13
7	Nicole Schott	Germany	172.39	10	55.54	7	116.85
8	Maé-Bérénice Méité	France	171.40	8	58.96	9	112.44
9	Elizaveta Tuktamysheva	Russia	167.65	11	53.03	8	114.62
10	Polina Edmunds	United States	157.77	9	56.31	10	101.46
11	Laurine Lecavelier	France	154.35	7	60.68	11	93.67

=== Pairs ===
Rank	Name	Nation	Total points	SP		FS	
1	Evgenia Tarasova / Vladimir Morozov	Russia	218.20	1	77.84	2	140.36
2	Vanessa James / Morgan Ciprès	France	214.32	2	73.18	1	141.14
3	Nicole Della Monica / Matteo Guarise	Italy	197.59	3	70.85	3	126.94
4	Liubov Ilyushechkina / Dylan Moscovitch	Canada	193.07	4	66.36	4	126.71
5	Peng Cheng / Jin Yang	China	188.14	5	62.40	5	125.74
6	Marissa Castelli / Mervin Tran	United States	177.15	6	58.99	6	118.16
7	Lola Esbrat / Andrei Novoselov	France	146.72	7	51.90	7	94.82
8	Zoe Jones / Christopher Boyadji	United Kingdom	130.43	8	44.59	8	85.84

=== Ice dance ===
Rank	Name	Nation	Total points	SP		FS	
1	Gabriella Papadakis / Guillaume Cizeron	France	201.98	1	81.40	1	120.58
2	Madison Chock / Evan Bates	United States	181.85	2	73.55	2	108.30
3	Alexandra Stepanova / Ivan Bukin	Russia	177.24	3	70.02	4	107.22
4	Kaitlyn Weaver / Andrew Poje	Canada	176.97	5	68.94	3	108.03
5	Charlène Guignard / Marco Fabbri	Italy	171.01	4	69.73	5	101.28
6	Angélique Abachkina / Louis Thauron	France	155.55	8	59.81	6	95.74
7	Elliana Pogrebinsky / Alex Benoit	United States	154.14	6	60.64	7	93.50
8	Natalia Kaliszek / Maksym Spodyriev	Poland	147.77	9	58.58	8	89.19
9	Alla Loboda / Pavel Drozd	Russia	145.85	7	60.43	9	85.42
10	Lorenza Alessandrini / Pierre Souquet	France	134.28	10	54.07	10	80.21
