= Slipstream (song) =

Single by Sherbet

from the album Slipstream
- B-side: "Jungle Jiver"
- Released: May 1974
- Recorded: Armstrong Studios
- Genre: Rock
- Length: 2:58
- Label: Infinity
- Songwriters: Garth Porter; Clive Shakespeare
- Producers: Sherbet; Tweed Harris

Sherbet singles chronology
"So Glad You're Mine" (1974)	"Slipstream" (1974)	"Silvery Moon" (1974)

"Slipstream" is a song by Australian band Sherbet, released in May 1974 as the second single from Sherbet's third studio album, Slipstream. The song peaked at number 5 on the Kent Music Report.

The song was written by Garth Porter and Clive Shakespeare.

== Track listing ==
No.	Title	Writer(s)	Length
1.	"Slipstream"	Garth Porter, Clive Shakespeare	2:58
2.	"Jungle Jiver"	Porter, Shakespeare	4:41

== Charts ==
=== Weekly charts ===
Chart (1974)	Peak position
Australia (Kent Music Report)	5

=== Year-end charts ===
Chart (1974)	Rank
Australia (Kent Music Report)	59

== Personnel ==
- Lead vocals – Daryl Braithwaite
- Bass, vocals – Tony Mitchell
- Keyboards, vocals – Garth Porter
- Drums – Alan Sandow
- Guitar, vocals – Clive Shakespeare
