= Elephants...Teeth Sinking into Heart =

Studio album by Rachael Yamagata
- Released: October 7, 2008
- Genre: Alternative rock, blues rock
- Length: 71:37
- Label: Warner Bros.
- Producer: Mike Mogis, John Alagía, Rachael Yamagata

Rachael Yamagata chronology
Loose Ends (EP) (2008)	Elephants...Teeth Sinking into Heart (2008)	Chesapeake (2011)

Cover for Selections from 'Elephants...Teeth Sinking into Heart' EP

Elephants...Teeth Sinking into Heart is the second studio album by American singer-songwriter Rachael Yamagata. It was released on October 7, 2008 via Warner Bros. Records in North America, October 22, 2008 in Japan, and March 2, 2009 in the UK.

== Development ==
The album is split into two CDs: Elephants, featuring a darker, more vulnerable and intimate tone, which is said to be more similar to Yamagata's debut, Happenstance; while ...Teeth Sinking into Heart, shows a grittier, more cynical side of the artist, who has described it as "this mix of Pulp Fiction surf guitar, PJ Harvey [and] Tom Waits-flavored rock tunes which would be great to play live but ... just developed into this entity that would break the beauty of (Elephants)." The album contains fifteen tracks (one of them hidden), ten appearing in the first disc, Elephants, and five in ...Teeth Sinking into Heart.

However, the Japanese release of the album consists of a single CD, containing sixteen tracks (the aforementioned fifteen tracks plus a bonus, "Jonah", not included in the American release.

Most of the album was produced by Mike Mogis, known for previous works with artists such as Bright Eyes, Rilo Kiley, and The Faint, among others. John Alagía, who produced Yamagata's first album, Happenstance, has also produced two of the tracks in this record ("What If I Leave", and "Horizon").

== Release ==
The release of this album comes over four years after Yamagata's debut album Happenstance; this delay was caused by changes at her original label, RCA, which ultimately led her to be released from her contract there. She has also changed managers during that time. Yamagata is now signed with Warner Bros. Records.

On August 26, 2008, Amazon.com and iTunes released a four-track EP, called Selections from Elephants...Teeth Sinking into Heart, which contained two tracks off each part of the album ("Elephants" and "Sunday Afternoon", from Elephants; and "Sidedish Friend" and "Accident", from ...Teeth Sinking into Heart).

On October 9, 2008, a two-song live acoustic video performance premiered on LiveDaily Sessions, featuring the songs "Faster" and "Sunday Afternoon".

The first single off the album was "Elephants" and the video for the song was released on September 16, 2008.

The album was subsequently released in Japan on October 22, 2008 and in the UK on March 2, 2009.

== Album packaging ==
The album is set in digipak and contains two discs; the first being Elephants and the second is ...Teeth Sinking into Heart.

== Critical reception ==
Professional ratings
Review scores
Source	Rating
AllMusic	4/5 stars
Billboard	(positive)
Rolling Stone	3.5/5 stars
Entertainment Weekly	B−
Spin	3/5 stars
Sputnikmusic	4.5/5 stars
LiveDaily	(positive)
PopMatters	6/10 stars
The Times	4/5 stars
The Independent	3/5 stars

Elephants...Teeth Sinking into Heart had been widely acclaimed by most critics. The album received a score of 72/100, with generally favorable reviews on the site Metacritic. In a glowing review, Andrew Leahey of Allmusic called Yamagata "one of the strongest songwriters to emerge during the early 21st century" while praising the song "Elephants" for its lyrical intensity. Billboard magazine in its review described the album as "an ambitious two-part album" and noted the contradictory yet effective musical styles between Elephants and ...Teeth Sinking into Heart.

Will Hermes of Rolling Stone magazine also noted the different musical direction and themes between the two discs on the album. He commented that Elephants is "a hushed mood piece that's all wet vowels and damaged love" and ...Teeth Sinking into Heart is "filled with rock & roll bite and gloves-off verses" while stating that Yamagata had pushes past familiar singer-songwriter fare into bolder regions with the album.

In another review on the site LiveDaily, the album is said to "chronicles the perils of heartache and, after time, the subsequent realignment of a love life through a creative two-part album". David Peisner of Spin magazine in his review said that the album "unwinds like a melancholy film score" and added that Yamagata is "more convincing as a moper, but the album's alternately punchy and slinky conclusion is heartening proof that she's no quitter".

Entertainment Weekly gave the album a rating of 'B−' and stated that the problem with the album lies in its two-part structure but were impressed by Yamagata's delivery of the songs. In the same review, the song "Elephants" was reviewed as being a standout and was stated as "belongs in the canon of great spurned-lover songs".

Evan Sawdey of PopMatters however, wasn't impressed with the album. He reviewed of disc Elephants "the kind of bland, ballad-heavy disc that Yamagata had avoided so gracefully thus far in her career, and it’s really a sad sight to see her finally succumb to such whims". Although dissatisfied with the first disc, Sawdey was impressed with ...Teeth Sinking into Heart and stated that the second disc "with its brisk running time, Teeth leaves you wanting more".

== Track listing ==
Elephants

1. "Elephants" — 4:14
2. "What If I Leave" — 5:03
3. "Little Life" — 4:07
4. "Sunday Afternoon" — 9:05
5. "Elephants Instrumental" — 1:46
6. "Duet" (with Ray LaMontagne) — 4:01
7. "Over and Over" — 5:25
8. "Brown Eyes" — 3:46
9. "Horizon" — 8:16
10. "The Only Fault" (Hidden track) — 4:04

...Teeth Sinking into Heart

1. "Sidedish Friend" — 3:00
2. "Accident" — 4:10
3. "Faster" — 3:50
4. "Pause the Tragic Ending" — 4:42
5. "Don't" — 3:05

Elephants...Teeth Sinking into Heart (Japanese Bonus Track Edition)

1. "Elephants" — 4:14
2. "What If I Leave" — 5:03
3. "Jonah" (Bonus Track) — 2:55
4. "Pause the Tragic Ending" — 4:42
5. "Faster" — 3:50
6. "Don't" — 3:05
7. "Accident" — 4:10
8. "Sidedish Friend" — 3:00
9. "Little Life" — 4:07
10. "Sunday Afternoon" — 9:04
11. "Elephants Instrumental" — 1:45
12. "Duet" (with Ray LaMontagne) — 4:01
13. "Over and Over" — 5:25
14. "The Only Fault" — 4:04
15. "Brown Eyes" — 3:46
16. "Horizon" — 8:16

== B-sides ==
1. "He Loves You Deep Inside" — 3:38

== Charts ==
Elephants...Teeth Sinking into Heart debuted at No. 53 on Billboard Hot 200 with sales of 9600 copies.

=== Album ===
Year	Chart	Position
2008	Billboard Top 200 (U.S.)	53
2008	Billboard Top Digital Albums (U.S.)	10
2008	Billboard Top Modern Rock/Alternative Albums (U.S.)	16
2008	Billboard Top Internet Albums (U.S.)	12
2008	Billboard Comprehensive Albums (U.S.)	54
2008	Billboard Top Rock Albums (U.S.)	20

=== Singles ===
Title	Chart	Position
"Elephants"	Billboard Hot Singles Sales (U.S.)	3

== Release history ==
Region	Date
United States	October 7, 2008
Japan	October 22, 2008
United Kingdom	March 2, 2009
