= Worn Me Down =

Single by Rachael Yamagata

from the album Happenstance
- Released: 2004; 2003 (Rachael Yamagata (EP))
- Genre: Alternative rock, blues rock, soft rock
- Length: 3:42; 3:43 (Rachael Yamagata (EP))
- Label: RCA Victor/Sony BMG
- Songwriter: Rachael Yamagata
- Producer: John Alagía

"Worn Me Down" is a song by American singer Rachael Yamagata. It was released as a single from her debut EP, Rachael Yamagata (EP) and was the first single from her first full-length album, Happenstance, which was released on June 8, 2004 in the U.S., and it is considered to be her most famous song to date.

== Background ==
"Worn Me Down" first appeared on Rachael Yamagata's five song debut EP where it was listed as a featured song, and was released on October 7, 2003. In 2004, the song was released as a single from the EP in Germany. It was one of two songs on the EP that were re-recorded for her full-length album Happenstance and by comparison, the re-arranged version of the song had a more produced sound, featured edgier electric guitars and drums, and a dominant orchestration. The melody has been called "straight-forward", and Yamagata's voice as being mature, highly emotional, and raspy. Her vocal style on "Worn Me Down" has been compared to that of Tori Amos, P.J. Harvey and KT Tunstall. Prior to the album's release, several critics believed that "Worn Me Down" would be the first single Yamagata would put out off of the full-length album, but with differing reasons.

The lyrics convey feelings of helplessness and obsessiveness; they are from the viewpoint of a woman in a twisted romance, and she has virtually given up on the man she is with, who is in fact infatuated with another woman.

== Reception ==
In general, critics gave positive to review to the song, claiming that "Worn Me Down" is an excellent platform for showcasing Yamagata's talent and maturity, and it has been called an "everlasting" song. However, some were dissatisfied with "Worn Me Down". PopMatters writer Marc Hogan called it "the disc's crassest moment", accusing Yamagata of placating to the Adult Contemporary audience with a generic song composition.

Additionally, critics were split between the version that appeared on the EP and the one that appeared on Happenstance. Katie Zerwas of PopMatters felt that the album version was overproduced and favored the version on the EP, whereas Gentry Boeckel of Stylus found that the EP version of "Worn Me Down" was "in an inferior form", stating that the one on the album was "100% better than the original.

== Success ==
In 2005, "Worn Me Down" premiered on the Billboard Charts under Adult Pop Songs, reaching No. 33, and stayed in the Top 40 for five weeks. Additionally, it was a Top 5 Hit at AAA radio, and was a favorite single in Billboard Music columnists' Michael Paoletta's "2004 in Review". The video for "Worn Me Down" also made the VH1 Top 40 list in December 2004 at No. 37, and peaked at No. 36 a few weeks later. It remained on the VH1 charts just under two months, before falling off after the week of February 12, 2005.

=== Chart performance ===
Chart (2005)	Peak position
U.S. Adult Pop Songs	33

=== Song appearances ===
Other albums
- Charmed: The Soundtrack (2003)
- Come on! All Super-Hits & Big-Breakers (2004)
- Connect Set (2005)
- ONXRT: Live from the Archives, Vol. 8 (2005)
- Festivalbar 2005: Compilation Blu (2006)
- Girly's Rockin' Girls Collection (2006)
- CMJ New Music, Vol. 117

Television Shows

- Miss Match (2003)
- Everwood (2004)
- The O.C. (2005)
- Laguna Beach: The Real Orange County (2005)

== Promotional CD ==
'Worn Me Down" Single Released in Germany, 2004.
No.	Title	Length
1.	"Worn Me Down"	3:43

=== Personnel ===
- Vocals, Tambourine - Rachael Yamagata
- Lead Guitar - Kevin Salem
- Rhythm Guitar, Electric Piano (Rhodes), Synthesizer (Ms 2000), Shaker - John Alagía
- Bass - Stewart Myers
- Cello - Oliver Kraus
- Drums - Brian Jones
- Saxophone (Baritone) - Jason Singer
- Assistant engineer – Alex Dixon, Oswald Bowe, Ted Young
- Engineer, Technician (Basic Tracking) - Jeff Juliano
- Mixed by - Jeff Juliano, John Alagía
- Music By, Lyrics By - Rachael Yamagata
- Producer – John Alagia
- Recorded by (Bass & Drums) - Stewart Myers
  - Credits from Discogs.

=== Other versions ===
- Album Version 3:43
- Alternative Version 4:34
- Marcus Dravs Remix 4:58
- KCRW Sessions 3:45
