= Live at the Loft & More =

EP by Rachael Yamagata
- Released: January 26, 2005
- Genre: Blues rock, rock
- Length: 25:15
- Label: BMG
- Producer: Kevin Salem; John Alagía

Rachael Yamagata chronology
Happenstance (2004)	Live at the Loft & More (2005)	Loose Ends (EP) (2008)

Live at the Loft & More is a 2005 album by Rachael Yamagata, released by BMG. It was produced by Kevin Salem except track 4, which was produced by John Alagía. The album was first released in Japan, before being released to US and UK audiences.

== Track listing ==
1. "Be Be Your Love" (Live at the Loft) – 4:44
2. "These Girls / Would You Please" (Live at the Loft) – 10:39
3. "Reason Why" (Live at the Loft) – 5:25
4. "River" – 4:25

== Promo version ==
Live at the Loft is another live EP by Rachael Yamagata that was released for promotional use only by BMG in 2004. The album was recorded at the XM Performance Theater in Washington DC, and was also produced by Kevin Salem.

== Track listing ==
1. "Sunday Afternoon"
2. "Worn Me Down"
3. "These Girls / Would You Please" (Medley)
4. "Be Be Your Love"
5. "Paper Doll"

== Release history ==
Region	Date
Japan	January 26, 2005
United Kingdom	March 29, 2005
United States	March 29, 2005
