= Rachael Yamagata (EP) =

Rachael Yamagata EP

EP by Rachael Yamagata
- Released: October 7, 2003
- Genres: Indie pop, rock, blues rock, folk rock
- Length: 31:39
- Labels: Private, BMG
- Producers: Malcolm Burn; Doug McBride

Rachael Yamagata chronology
| Rachael Yamagata EP (2003) | Happenstance (2004) |

Professional ratings
Review scores
| Source | Rating |
|---|---|
| Allmusic | 4/5 stars |

Rachael Yamagata EP, otherwise referred to as Rachael Yamagata or EP, is an extended play by American recording artist Rachael Yamagata, released by Private Music on October 7, 2003. All songs and lyrics were written by Yamagata except "These Girls", which was co-written by Chris Holmes. The album was produced by Malcolm Burn except the song "Collide", which was produced by Doug McBride. "Collide" appears on the Bumpus album Stereoscope, and "Worn Me Down" and "The Reason Why" were re-recorded for Yamagata's debut album Happenstance.

== Track listing ==
1. "Collide"
2. "Known for Years"
3. "Worn Me Down" (EP Version)
4. "The Reason Why" (EP Version)
5. "Would You Please" (including hidden track "These Girls")

== Release history ==
| Region | Date |
|---|---|
| United States | October 7, 2003 |
| United Kingdom | March 15, 2004 |
