= Loose Ends (EP) =

EP by Rachael Yamagata
- Released: May 22, 2008 (digital)
- Genre: Blues rock, rock
- Length: 11:44
- Label: Warner Bros.

Rachael Yamagata chronology
Live at the Loft & More (2005)	Loose Ends (2008)	Elephants...Teeth Sinking into Heart (2008)

Loose Ends is a 2008 digitally released EP by Rachael Yamagata that was made available for download from her official website. The album contains three songs, running for almost twelve minutes, and served as a taster for fans in advance of her delayed second full-length album, which was originally scheduled for release in summer 2007, but did not hit stores until late 2008.

She introduces the EP with a small letter/poem to her fans:

Oh record, oh record
where can you be
is it time
just about?
what's this, an ep?
three songs in a mood
for the love of my life
my fans, dare I ask
will you make me your wife?
Hold tight sweet love
for we're more than just friends,
until the release
i give you loose ends...
Three songs for you as a wait. Much much love.
-Rachael

== Track listing ==
1. "The Other Side" (4:15)
2. "Parade" (3:23)
3. "Answering the Door" (4:08)
