= So Glad You're Mine =

Single by Sherbet

from the album Slipstream
- B-side: "For Your Love"
- Released: January 1974
- Recorded: Armstrong Studios
- Genre: Rock
- Length: 2:49
- Label: Infinity
- Songwriters: Garth Porter; Clive Shakespeare
- Producers: Sherbet; Tweed Harris

Sherbet singles chronology
"Cassandra" (1973)	"So Glad You're Mine" (1974)	"Slipstream" (1974)

"So Glad You're Mine" is a song by Australian band Sherbet. It was released in January 1974 as the lead single from the band's third studio album, Slipstream. It reached number 44 on the Kent Music Report.

The song was written by Sherbet members Garth Porter and Clive Shakespeare.

== Track listing ==
No.	Title	Writer(s)	Length
1.	"So Glad You're Mine"	Garth Porter, Clive Shakespeare	2:49
2.	"For Your Love"	Shakespeare	3:10

== Personnel ==
- Bass, vocals – Tony Mitchell
- Drums – Alan Sandow
- Engineer – Richard Batchens
- Guitar, vocals – Clive Shakespeare
- Keyboards, vocals – Garth Porter
- Lead vocals – Daryl Braithwaite

== Charts ==
Chart (1974)	Peak position
Australia (Kent Music Report)	44
