= Lola Esbrat =

French pair skater (born 1997)

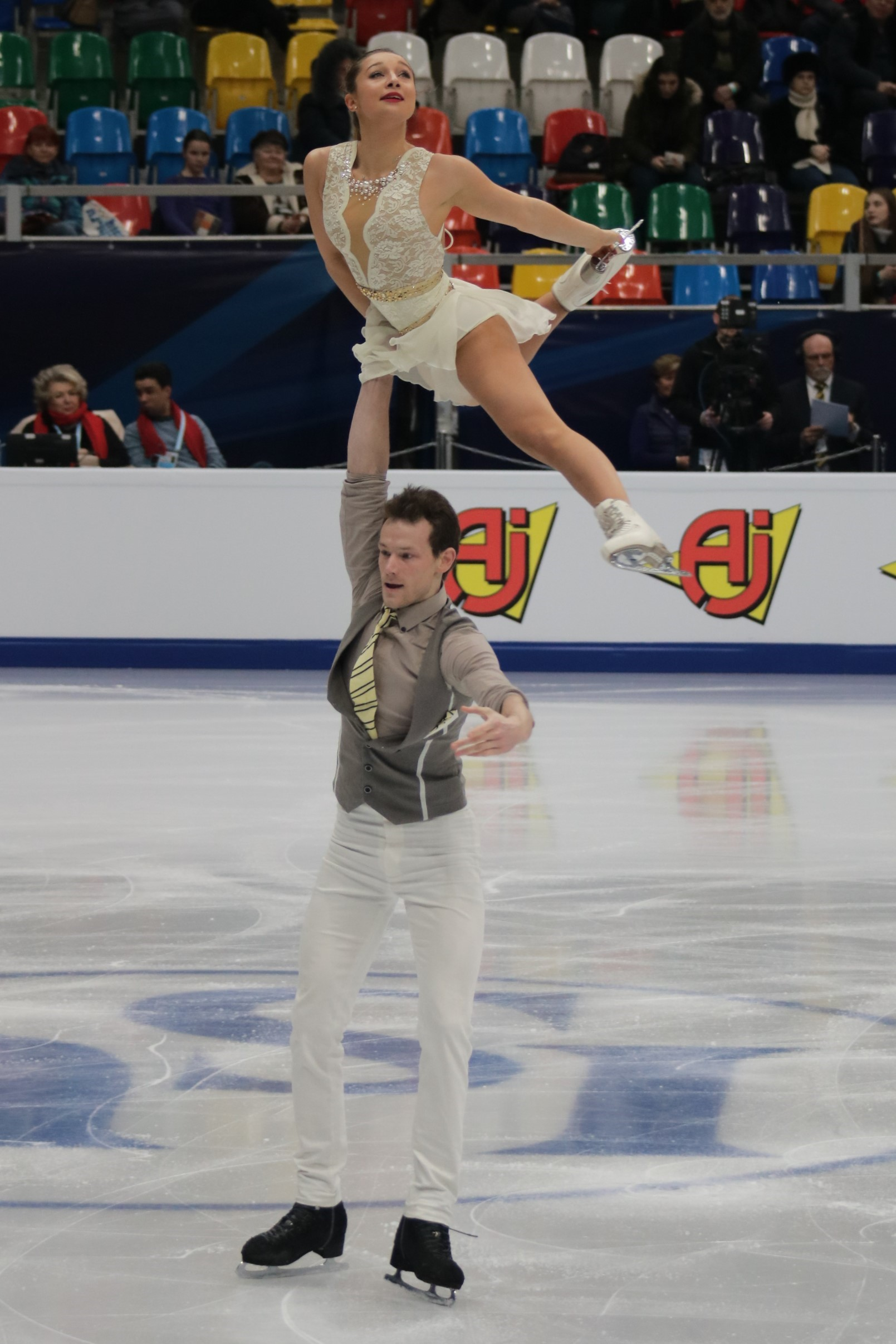
- Lola Esbrat and Andrei Novoselov in 2018

Personal information
- Born: 29 August 1997 (age 28) Paris, France
- Home town: Vincennes, France
- Height: 1.58 m (5 ft 2 in)

Figure skating career
- Country: France
- Partner: Andrei Novoselov
- Coach: Claude Thevenard
- Skating club: Français Volants Paris Bercy
- Began skating: 2004

Lola Esbrat (born 29 August 1997) is a French pair skater. With her skating partner Andrei Novoselov, she has won three international medals and is the 2018 French national champion.

== Personal life ==
Esbrat was born on 29 August 1997 in Paris. She studied law via correspondence courses but had stopped her studies by January 2017.

== Career ==
Esbrat began learning to skate in 2004. She competed in ladies' singles through the 2013–14 season. She started training as a pair skater, in partnership with Nicolas Hejzlar, by July 2014.

=== Partnership with Novoselov ===
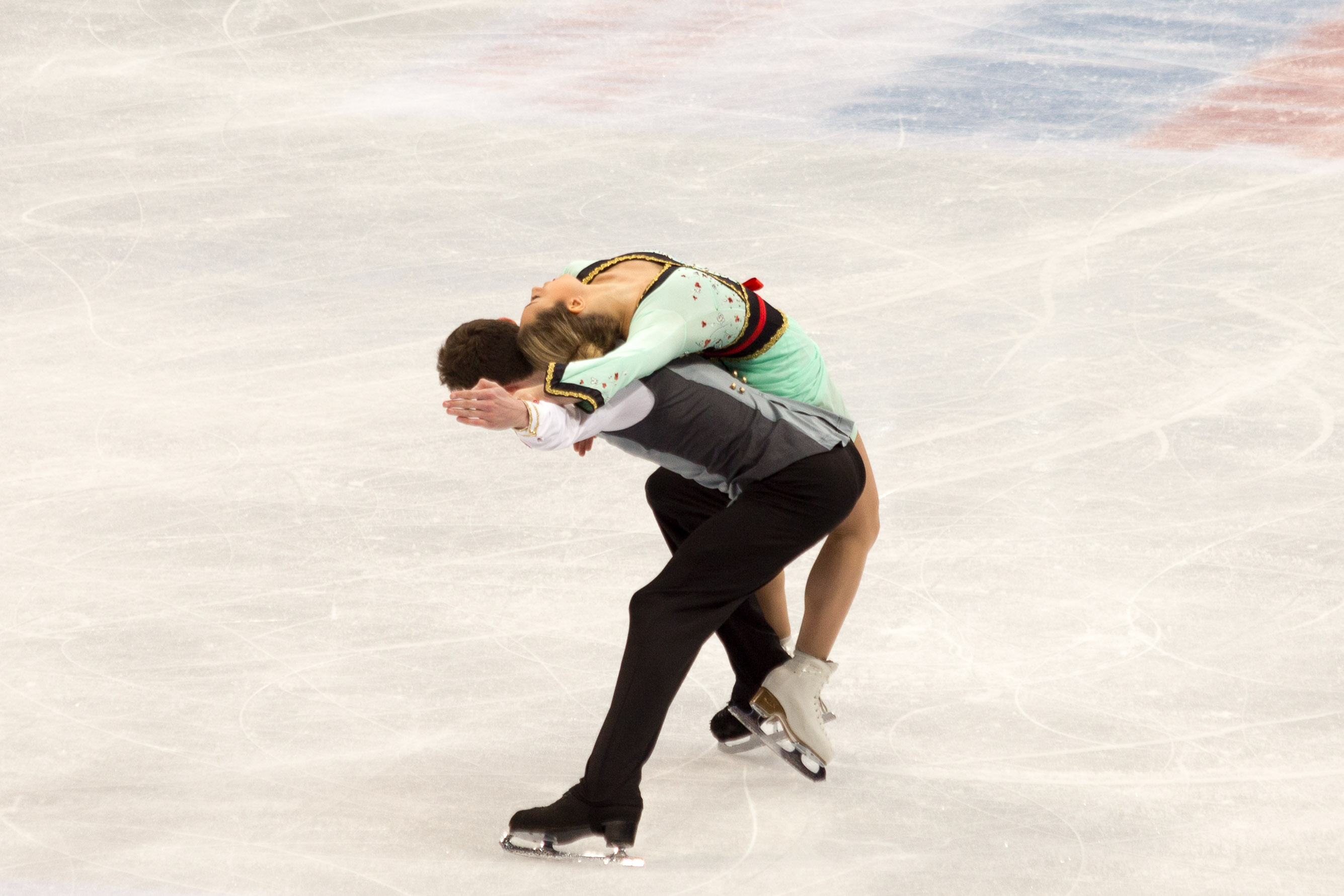
Esbrat and Novoselov at the 2017 Worlds

Esbrat teamed up with Russia's Andrei Novoselov in mid-2015. They are coached by Claude Thevenard in Paris and compete for France. In 2016, the pair won bronze medals at the Toruń Cup and Bavarian Open. In early April, they competed at the 2016 World Championships in Boston; they qualified to the free skate and finished 16th overall.

In the 2016–17 season, Esbrat/Novoselov won the silver medal at the NRW Trophy and placed 5th at the Toruń Cup. In January 2017, they placed 11th in the short program, 13th in the free skate, and 13th overall at the 2017 European Championships in Ostrava, Czech Republic.

== Programs ==
(with Novoselov)

Season	Short program	Free skating
2017–2018	Nocturne (from Lady Caliph) by Ennio Morricone performed by Yo-Yo Ma	The Great Gatsby; Back to Black by Amy Winehouse, Mark Ronson; Catgroove by Parov Stelar; Hotel Sayre by Craig Armstrong; Young and Beautiful by Lana Del Rey; Crazy in Love
2016–2017	Memoirs of a Geisha by John Williams	The Great Gatsby; Back to Black performed by Beyoncé; Cat Groove by Parov Stelar; Young and Beautiful by Lana Del Rey; Crazy in Love performed by Emeli Sandé
2015–2016	Fallin' by Alicia Keys	Maleficent by James Newton Howard; Once Upon a Dream performed by Lana Del Rey; Maleficent by James Newton Howard

== Competitive highlights ==
GP: Grand Prix; CS: Challenger Series

=== Pairs with Novoselov ===
International
Event	2015–16	2016–17	2017–18	2018-19
World Champ.	16th	27th	25th	
European Champ.		13th	10th	
GP France		WD	7th	WD
CS Tallinn Trophy			4th	
Bavarian Open	3rd			
Cup of Nice			5th	
Cup of Tyrol	4th			
NRW Trophy		2nd		
Toruń Cup	3rd	5th		
National
French Champ.		2nd	1st	
Master's			2nd	
TBD = Assigned; WD = Withdrew

=== Ladies' singles ===
International
Event	2013–14
Coupe du Printemps	2nd J
National
French Junior Championships	5th
J = Junior level
