= Happenstance (Rachael Yamagata album) =

Studio album by Rachael Yamagata
- Released: June 8, 2004
- Genres: Alternative rock, blues rock
- Length: 63:06
- Label: RCA Victor
- Producer: John Alagía

Rachael Yamagata chronology
Rachael Yamagata (EP) (2003)	Happenstance (2004)	Live at the Loft & More (2005)

Additional cover
- UK release front cover

Professional ratings
Review scores
Source	Rating
AllMusic	4/5 stars
Blender	3/5 stars
Contactmusic.com	(positive)
Metacritic	(74/100)
MSN Music	4/5 stars
PopMatters	9/10 stars
Rolling Stone	3/5 stars
Stylus Magazine	4.5/5 stars
The Guardian	3/5 stars

Happenstance is the debut studio album by American singer-songwriter Rachael Yamagata. It was released on RCA Victor on June 8, 2004, in the United States, and May 16, 2005, in the United Kingdom. Three months after its release in the United States, on September 8, 2004, a limited edition including two bonus tracks was released in Japan.

The album was produced by John Alagía, at Compass Point Studios except for the songs "Paper Doll" (produced by Kevin Salem), and "Collide" (part of the Japanese release produced by Doug McBride).

== Track listing ==
=== American & UK release ===
1. "Be Be Your Love" (Rachael Yamagata and John Alagia) —4:12
2. "Letter Read" (Rachael Yamagata) —3:44
3. "Worn Me Down" (Rachael Yamagata) —3:42
4. "Paper Doll" (Rachael Yamagata and Kevin Salem) —5:15
5. "I'll Find a Way" (Rachael Yamagata) —5:14
6. "1963" (Rachael Yamagata and Mark Batson) —4:02
7. "Under My Skin" (Rachael Yamagata) —4:11
8. "Meet Me by the Water" (Rachael Yamagata) —3:58
9. "Even So" (Rachael Yamagata) —4:18
10. "I Want You" (Rachael Yamagata and Dan Wilson) —2:56
11. "Reason Why" (Rachael Yamagata) —5:06
12. "Moments with Oliver" [instrumental] (Rachael Yamagata) —1:02
13. "Quiet" (Rachael Yamagata) —6:02
14. "Ode To..." [unlisted track] (Rachael Yamagata) —5:47

=== Japanese Limited Edition release ===
1. "Be Be Your Love" —4:12
2. "Worn Me Down" —3:42
3. "Letter Read" —3:44
4. "Collide" —5:02
5. "Paper Doll" —5:15
6. "Moments with Oliver" —1:02
7. "Quiet" —5:02
8. "Under My Skin" —4:11
9. "1963" —4:02
10. "Edith" —7:01
11. "Even So" —4:18
12. "Meet Me By the Water" —3:58
13. "I Want You" —2:56
14. "I'll Find a Way" —5:14
15. "Reason Why" —5:06
16. "Ode to..." —5:47

== Japan 2005 Tour Sampler ==
Japan 2005 Tour Sampler is another Promo EP by Rachael Yamagata released by RCA in 2005.

1. "Worn Me Down" (Album version from Happenstance)
2. "1963" (Album version from Happenstance)
3. "Be Be Your Love" (Album version from Happenstance)
4. "The Reason Why" (Live version from Live at the Loft & More)
5. "Be Be Your Love" (Live version from Live at the Loft & More)

== Charts ==
=== Album ===
Year	Chart	Position
2004	Billboard Top Heatseekers (U.S.)	17

=== Singles ===
Title	Chart	Position
Worn Me Down	U.S. Billboard Hot Adult Top 40	33
Letter Read		—

== Release history ==
Region	Date
United States	June 8, 2004
Japan	September 8, 2004
United Kingdom	May 16, 2005
