= Rachael Yamagata =

American musician (born 1977)

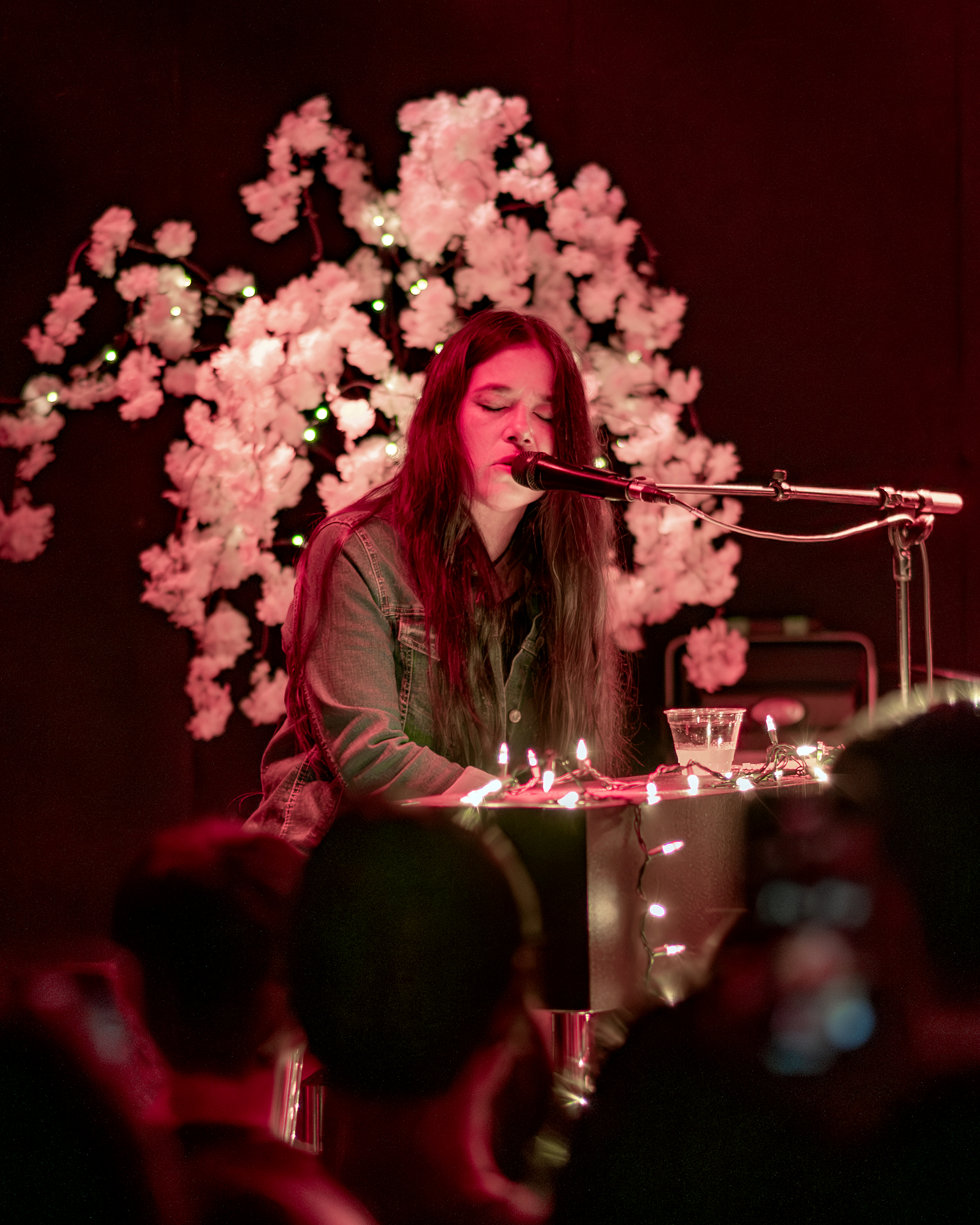
- Rachael Yamagata in 2024

Background information
- Born: September 23, 1977 (age 49); Arlington, Virginia, United States
- Genres: Adult alternative, indie
- Occupation: Singer-songwriter
- Instruments: Piano, guitar, vocals
- Years active: 1995–present
- Labels: RCA Victor, Warner Bros., Frankenfish/Megaforce
- Formerly of: Bumpus
- Website: www.rachaelyamagata.com

Rachael Amanda Yamagata (born September 23, 1977) is an American singer-songwriter and pianist from Arlington, Virginia. She began her musical career with the band Bumpus before becoming a solo artist and releasing five EPs and four studio albums. Her songs have appeared on numerous television shows and she has collaborated with Jason Mraz, Rhett Miller, Bright Eyes, Ryan Adams, Toots and the Maytals, Ray LaMontagne and Matt Nathanson.

== Early life and education ==
Yamagata was born to a Japanese-American father and an Italian mother and grew up with comedian-actor Josh Ruben as a half-brother. She graduated from the Holton-Arms School and attended Northwestern University and Vassar College.

== Career ==
Yamagata became the vocalist for the Chicago group Bumpus and spent six years touring, writing and recording with the band before leaving in 2001 to begin a solo career. In September 2002, she obtained a two-record deal with Arista's Private Music and her self-titled EP produced by Malcolm Burn, Rachael Yamagata EP was released in October. Her first full-length album, Happenstance, followed in 2004. The album was produced by John Alagía at Compass Point Studios. Between 2003 and 2005, Yamagata played venues such as Amoeba Records and The Hotel Café, both in Hollywood.

Yamagata was featured on the album True Love by Toots and the Maytals, which won the Grammy Award in 2004 for Best Reggae Album, and showcased many notable musicians including Willie Nelson, Eric Clapton, Jeff Beck, Trey Anastasio, Gwen Stefani / No Doubt, Ben Harper, Bonnie Raitt, Manu Chao, The Roots, Ryan Adams, Keith Richards, Toots Hibbert, Paul Douglas, Jackie Jackson, Ken Boothe, and The Skatalites.

Yamagata toured with Mandy Moore and contributed a song to Moore's 2007 album, Wild Hope.

In May 2008, Yamagata released a three-song EP, Loose Ends. Her second full-length album Elephants...Teeth Sinking Into Heart was released in October 2008. Billboard characterized the album as much darker and sadder in tone than its predecessor. That month, her two-song live acoustic video performance appeared on LiveDaily Sessions and featured the songs "Faster" and "Sunday Afternoon". In April 2009, Yamagata performed her song "Elephants" on the television drama One Life to Live.

Yamagata digitally released a new album in the fall of 2011 through Pledgemusic. Her third studio album Chesapeake was released through Frankenfish Records in October 2011. In 2012 Yamagata released her next EP called Heavyweight. Yamagata has appeared numerous times as a guest vocalist for other artists including: Jason Mraz's "Did You Get My Message?", "Fireflies" and "The Believer" by Rhett Miller, on Toots & the Maytals's album True Love, the song "Barfly" by Ray Lamontagne, and several songs on Ryan Adams' Cold Roses album. She contributed vocals to six songs on the Bright Eyes album Cassadaga. Yamagata contributed writing, keyboards and vocals to the song "Kaleidoscope" by Jill Cunniff a former member of Luscious Jackson. Yamagata also performs with an ensemble cast on the 30 Rock episode "Kidney Now!" The soundtrack for the film Dear John features the song "You Take My Troubles Away", Yamagata's duet with Dan Wilson. She also performs the Muppets song "I'm Going to Go Back There Someday" on a cover album, Muppets: The Green Album.

Yamagata again partnered with PledgeMusic for her album Tightrope Walker, released on September 23, 2016. She also offered an acoustic digital version of Happenstance as a pledge reward.

== Personal life ==
Yamagata has a twin brother, Benji. Her half brother, Josh Ruben, is an actor and director who worked for CollegeHumor.

== Discography ==
=== Studio albums ===
Title	Album details	Peak chart positions	
Title	Album details	KOR	US
Happenstance	Released: June 8, 2004; Label: RCA Victor	40	—
Elephants...Teeth Sinking into Heart	Released: October 7, 2008; Label: Warner Bros. Records	— (Note: Elephants...Teeth Sinking into Heart did not enter the Gaon Album Chart, but it peaked at #33 on the component international album chart.)	53
Chesapeake	Released: October 11, 2011; Label: Frankenfish	13	122
Acoustic Happenstance	Released: April 23, 2016; Label: Sony Music	47	—
Tightrope Walker	Released: September 23, 2016; Label: Frankenfish	32	—
Starlit Alchemy	Released: October 3, 2025; Label: Jullian Records	-	—

=== Compilation albums ===
Title	Album details	Peak chart positions
Title	Album details	KOR
The Very Best of Rachael Yamagata	Released: August 22, 2014; Label: Sony Music	67

=== Extended plays ===
Title	Album details	Peak chart positions
Title	Album details	KOR
EP	Released: October 7, 2003; Label: RCA Records	—
Live at the Loft & More	Released: January 26, 2005; Label: BMG	—
Loose Ends	Released: May 22, 2008; Label: Warner Bros. Records	—
Heavyweight EP	Released: November 20, 2012; Label: Frankenfish	44
Porch Songs EP	Released: October 12, 2018; Label: Sony Music	91

=== Singles ===
Title	Year	Peak chart positions			Sales	Album
Title	Year	KOR	KOR Intl.	US Adult	Sales	Album
"Worn Me Down"	2003	—	—	33		EP
"Letter Read"	2004	—	—	—		Happenstance
"1963"	2004	—	—	—		Happenstance
"Be Be Your Love"	2004	26	1	—	KOR: 1,635,206	Happenstance
"River"	2005	—	—	—		Live at the Loft & More
"Elephants"	2008	—	—	—		Elephants...Teeth Sinking into Heart
"Faster"	2008	—	—	—		Elephants...Teeth Sinking into Heart
"Sunday Afternoon"	2008	—	—	—		Elephants...Teeth Sinking into Heart
"Starlight"	2011	—	—	—		Chesapeake
"Even If I Don't"	2011	—	—	—		Chesapeake
"You Won't Let Me"	2011	—	12	—	KOR: 337,397	Chesapeake
"Nothing Gets By Here"	2012	—	6	—	KOR: 53,513	Heavyweight EP
"I'm Not in Love" (10cc cover)	2014	—	28	—	KOR: 10,053	The Very Best of Rachael Yamagata
"Nobody"	2016	—	—	—		Tightrope Walker
"Over"	2016	—	—	—		Tightrope Walker
"Let Me Be Your Girl"	2016	—	—	—		Tightrope Walker
"Be Somebody's Love"	2018	—	—	—		Porch Songs EP
"It's Always the Little Things" (with Guo Ding)	2018	—	—	—		Non-album single

=== Original soundtrack contributions ===
Title	Year	Peak chart positions	Sales	Album
Title	Year	KOR Intl.	Sales	Album
"I Wish You Love"	2005	—		Prime OST
"Jesus Was a Cross Maker" (Judee Sill cover)	2005	—		Elizabethtown OST
"He Needs a Kidney" (with various artists) (from 30 Rock)	2009	—		Non-album single
"Hand of God"	2012	—		That's What She Said OST
"Let's Begin Again" (with John Medeski) (Robert Altman cover)	2014	—		Altman OST
"Something in the Rain"	2018	10		Something in the Rain OST
"La La La"	2018	31		Something in the Rain OST
"No Direction"	2019	—		One Spring Night OST
"Is It You"	2019	—		One Spring Night OST
"We Could Still Be Happy"	2019	—		One Spring Night OST

=== Other soundtrack appearances ===
Yamagata's songs have appeared in a number of films and television shows. These include:

Title	Year	Media
"1963"	2005	Monster-in-Law
"1963"	2015	November Rule
"Be Be Your Love"	2004	One Tree Hill
"Be Be Your Love"	2005	The Sisterhood of the Traveling Pants
"Be Be Your Love"	2005	Trust the Man
"Be Be Your Love"	2006	Brothers & Sisters
"Be Be Your Love"	2009	So You Think You Can Dance
"Be Be Your Love"	2011	So You Think You Can Dance
"Be Be Your Love"	2012	Wilsberg
"Be Somebody's Love"	2018	Something in the Rain
"Blister of the Spotlight" (with Ashtar Command)	2008	Ugly Betty
"Brown Eyes"	2009	Grey's Anatomy
"Collide"	2005	In Her Shoes
"Don't"	2009	Private Practice
"Duet"	2008	Brothers & Sisters
"Duet"	2009	Grey's Anatomy
"Elephants"	2009	One Life to Live
"Elephants"	2010	Gravity
"Elephants"	2015	The Vampire Diaries
"Horizon"	2009	One Tree Hill
"I Don't Want to Be Your Mother"	2012	Hope Springs
"I Want You"	2006	Men in Trees
"I'll Find a Way"	2005	ER
"Keep Going"	2015	The Vampire Diaries
"Meet Me by the Water"	2006	Bella
"The Other Side"	2008	The L Word
"Paper Doll"	2005	Trust the Man
"Quiet"	2006	How I Met Your Mother
"Quiet"	2023	Ted Lasso
"The Reason Why"	2004	Smallville
"The Reason Why"	2005	The O.C.
"The Reason Why"	2008	Cashmere Mafia
"The Reason Why"	2009	Hotel for Dogs
"The Reason Why"	2009	Brain Drain
"Saturday Morning"	2020	Scare Me
"Sunday Afternoon"	2010	One Tree Hill
"The Way It Seems to Go"	2013	Lucky Them
"Worn Me Down"	2003	Miss Match
"Worn Me Down"	2004	The O.C.
