= Gabriella Papadakis =

French retired ice dancer (born 1995)

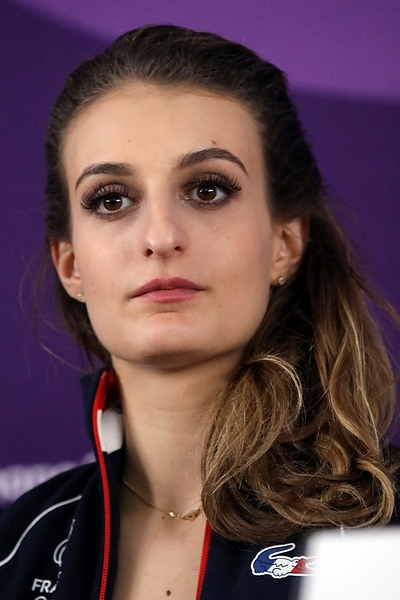
- Papadakis at the 2018 Winter Olympic Games

Personal information
- Born: 10 May 1995 (age 31) Clermont-Ferrand, France
- Height: 1.66 m (5 ft 5 in)

Figure skating career
- Country: France
- Partner: Guillaume Cizeron (c. 2004–2024)
- Coach: Romain Haguenauer, Marie-France Dubreuil, Patrice Lauzon, Catherine Pinard
- Skating club: Clermont-Ferrand; Gadbois Centre
- Began skating: 1998
- Retired: December 3, 2024
- Highest WS: 2 (2017–2019)
Event	Gold medal – first place	Silver medal – second place	Bronze medal – third place
Olympic Games	1	1	0
World Championships	5	1	0
European Championships	5	1	0
Grand Prix Final	2	1	1
French Championships	7	1	0
World Junior Championships	0	1	0
Junior Grand Prix Final	0	1	0
Medal list
Olympic Games
Gold medal – first place	2022 Beijing	Ice dance
Silver medal – second place	2018 Pyeongchang	Ice dance
World Championships
Gold medal – first place	2015 Shanghai	Ice dance
Gold medal – first place	2016 Boston	Ice dance
Gold medal – first place	2018 Milan	Ice dance
Gold medal – first place	2019 Saitama	Ice dance
Gold medal – first place	2022 Montpellier	Ice dance
Silver medal – second place	2017 Helsinki	Ice dance
European Championships
Gold medal – first place	2015 Stockholm	Ice dance
Gold medal – first place	2016 Bratislava	Ice dance
Gold medal – first place	2017 Ostrava	Ice dance
Gold medal – first place	2018 Moscow	Ice dance
Gold medal – first place	2019 Minsk	Ice dance
Silver medal – second place	2020 Graz	Ice dance
Grand Prix Final
Gold medal – first place	2017–18 Nagoya	Ice dance
Gold medal – first place	2019–20 Torino	Ice dance
Silver medal – second place	2016–17 Marseille	Ice dance
Bronze medal – third place	2014–15 Barcelona	Ice dance
French Championships
Gold medal – first place	2015 Megève	Ice dance
Gold medal – first place	2016 Épinal	Ice dance
Gold medal – first place	2017 Caen	Ice dance
Gold medal – first place	2018 Nantes	Ice dance
Gold medal – first place	2019 Vaujany	Ice dance
Gold medal – first place	2020 Dunkirk	Ice dance
Gold medal – first place	2022 Cergy-Pontoise	Ice dance
Silver medal – second place	2014 Vaujany	Ice dance
World Junior Championships
Silver medal – second place	2013 Milan	Ice dance
Junior Grand Prix Final
Silver medal – second place	2012–13 Sochi	Ice dance

Gabriella Marie-Hélène Papadakis (born 10 May 1995) is a French ice dancer. With former partner Guillaume Cizeron, she is a 2022 Olympic champion, 2018 Olympic silver medalist, a five-time World champion (2015–2016, 2018–2019, 2022), a five-time consecutive European champion (2015–2019), the 2017 and 2019 Grand Prix Final champion, and a seven-time French national champion (2015–2020, 2022). They have won ten gold medals on the Grand Prix series. Earlier in their career, they won silver at the 2012 Junior Grand Prix Final and at the 2013 World Junior Championships.

Papadakis and Cizeron have broken world records 34 times, which is itself a record across all figure skating disciplines since the introduction of the ISU Judging System in 2004. They are the former and historical world record holders in the short dance, free dance, and combined total. They are the first team to have broken the 90-point barrier in the rhythm dance, 120-point and 130-point barriers in the free dance, and the first team to score above the 200-point, 210-point, and 220-point barriers in the combined total score.

The pair are recognized for their lyrical and musical style. Their programs, inspired by modern dance, have been described as lyrical, and commentators have frequently acclaimed the quality of their skating skills.

== Personal life ==
Gabriella Papadakis was born on 10 May 1995 in Clermont-Ferrand, France. She is the daughter of Catherine, a French skating coach, and Emmanuel, the owner of a food truck in Austin, Texas. Her father is from Korydallos, Greece, and his family has roots in Crete.

Catherine raised Papadakis as a single mother. In her memoir, Pour ne pas disparaître ("To Not Disappear", 2025), Papadakis detailed their tumultuous relationship, describing Catherine as an "authoritarian mother" who was easy to anger. She further shared, "My mother and I became real enemies. She thought her strictness would save me from self-destruction. But I didn't know how to explain to her that I needed my mother, tenderness, and a break... I was suffocating from her pressure."

Growing up, Papadakis attended a music school, where she learned to play the violin.

In 2023, Papadakis came out as bisexual. In her memoir, Papadakis said that she was a survivor of sexual assault, having been raped twice during her adolescence.

== Career ==
=== Early career ===
Papadakis and Cizeron teamed up when they were about 9 or 10 years old in Clermont-Ferrand at the suggestion of her mother, Catherine Papadakis. She coached them from the beginning of their partnership. Many years later, in 2026 Papadakis discussed the negative aspects of this dynamic, alleging that her mother and Cizeron would constantly exclude her from decision-making, leading to her to gradually lose all self-confidence. She said she felt that the only way her mother and Cizeron could get along was by "ganging up on her."

=== 2009–10 season: Junior International Debut ===
The pair debuted on the ISU Junior Grand Prix series in 2009–10, placing 15th at JGP United States. They were 22nd at the 2010 World Junior Championships.

=== 2010–11 season ===
In 2010–11, Papadakis/Cizeron finished 4th at JGP France and won bronze at their second event, in Austria. They advanced to 12th at the 2011 World Junior Championships.

=== 2011–12 season ===
In 2011–12, Papadakis/Cizeron finished 4th at both of their Junior Grand Prix events. They rose to 5th at the 2012 World Junior Championships.

=== 2012–13 season: Junior World Silver & Coaching change ===
In mid-June 2012, Papadakis/Cizeron decided to move to Lyon to train with new coaches Muriel Zazoui, Romain Haguenauer, and Olivier Schoenfelder. They competed in their fourth season of the Junior Grand Prix, winning their first title at JGP France. They took another gold medal at JGP Austria, where they scored their personal best of 142.08 points. Their wins qualified them for the 2012–13 JGP Final in Sochi, Russia. Papadakis/Cizeron won the silver medal in Sochi behind Russian ice dancers Alexandra Stepanova / Ivan Bukin. At the 2013 World Junior Championships in Milan, the French placed second in the short dance. On the day of the free dance, Papadakis sprained her ankle in an off-ice warm-up before the morning practice. During the competition, she paused after 2:52 minutes and was allowed a medical break, after which she and Cizeron completed the dance. They placed third in the free dance and second overall, stepping onto the podium along with gold medalists Stepanova/Bukin and bronze medalists Aldridge/Eaton.

=== 2013–14 season: Senior International Debut ===
Papadakis/Cizeron decided to move up to the senior level for the 2013–14 season. They made their senior international debut at the International Cup of Nice, winning gold. The duo competed at two senior Grand Prix assignments, placing fifth at the 2013 Trophée Eric Bompard and seventh at the 2013 Rostelecom Cup.

Initially named as alternates for the 2014 European Championships, they were called up when Nathalie Péchalat / Fabian Bourzat withdrew. They placed 15th at the event, held in January in Budapest, and 13th at the 2014 World Championships, held in March in Saitama.

=== 2014–15 season: World and European Champions & Re-location ===
In July 2014, Papadakis/Cizeron relocated with Haguenauer to Montreal, Quebec, Canada. Marie-France Dubreuil, Patrice Lauzon, and Pascal Denis joined Haguenauer as the duo's coaches. Their free dance was inspired by a ballet, Le Parc. The two began their season by winning an ISU Challenger Series event, the 2014 Skate Canada Autumn Classic, where they defeated Piper Gilles / Paul Poirier. In November, Papadakis/Cizeron reached their first Grand Prix podium, winning gold at the 2014 Cup of China ahead of Maia Shibutani / Alex Shibutani and 2014 World champions Anna Cappellini / Luca Lanotte. Beating Gilles/Poirier again, they took their second GP title at the 2014 Trophée Éric Bompard and qualified for their first Grand Prix Final. At the latter event, held in December 2014 in Barcelona, they placed fifth in the short dance, third in the free dance, and third overall behind Kaitlyn Weaver / Andrew Poje and Madison Chock / Evan Bates.

In January 2015, Papadakis/Cizeron ranked first in both segments at the 2015 European Championships in Stockholm and took the gold medal by a margin of 8.45 points over the World champions, Anna Cappellini / Luca Lanotte.

In March, they competed at the World Championships in Shanghai, China. Ranked fourth in the short dance and first in the free dance, they finished first overall ahead of Madison Chock / Evan Bates, whom they outscored by 2.94 points. They were the first French skaters to win a World title since 2008 and the youngest World champions in ice dance in 49 years.

=== 2015–16 season: World and European Champions a Second Time ===
On 28 August 2015, Papadakis sustained a cerebral concussion after a fall in practice. According to Dubreuil, "They clipped each other's blades, and she fell right on her head. The symptoms were instant. We could see she was walking wobbly; she had trouble putting words together." Subsequently, Papadakis/Cizeron withdrew from the Master's de Patinage in Orléans scheduled in the second week of October. On 12 November 2015, they withdrew from their Grand Prix events, the 2015 Trophée Éric Bompard and 2015 NHK Trophy. Doctors were uncertain about how long her recovery would take. In March 2016, Papadakis said, "I couldn't go out, skate, read, or have a conversation with people. It was impossible to concentrate. I still have some symptoms."

Papadakis/Cizeron returned to competition in December to win their second national title. The following month, at the 2016 European Championships in Bratislava, Papadakis/Cizeron placed second to Italy's Anna Cappellini / Luca Lanotte in the short dance. They were first in the free dance and won their second consecutive European title.

In March, a skate blade hit Papadakis' knee while she was practicing steps with Cizeron. According to Haguenauer, "Her knee was open, she had eight stitches, but it's superficial," and she resumed training on 21 March. Papadakis/Cizeron placed first in the short dance at the 2016 World Championships in Boston, ahead of Maia Shibutani / Alex Shibutani of the United States. They set a world record score in the free program of 118.17, beating the previous world record held by Meryl Davis / Charlie White of the United States of 116.63 at the 2014 Winter Olympics. They won the competition with a personal best overall score of 194.46, 6.03 points ahead of Maia Shibutani / Alex Shibutani. The duo withdrew from their final competition of the season, the 2016 Team Challenge Cup in April 2016, because Papadakis had a mild case of mononucleosis.

=== 2016–17 season: World Silver, European Champion x3 ===
Competing in the 2016–17 Grand Prix series, Papadakis/Cizeron won gold at the 2016 Trophée de France and silver at the 2016 NHK Trophy, behind Canada's Tessa Virtue / Scott Moir. In December 2016, they received the silver medal at the Grand Prix Final in Marseille, France, finishing second again to Virtue/Moir. With numerous small mistakes popping up, they were showing the most vulnerability since their rise to the top and placed 3rd in the short dance of this event, behind Shibutani/Shibutani.

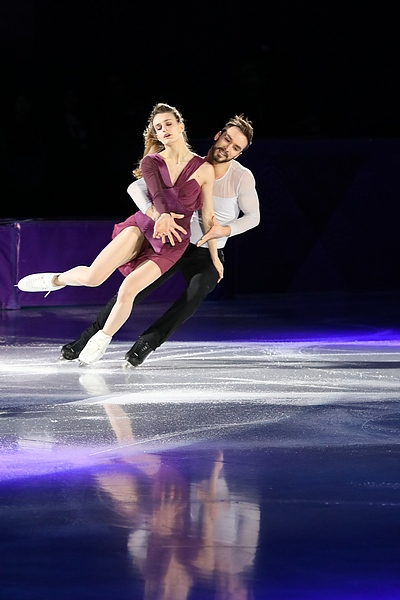
Papadakis/Cizeron at the 2018 Winter Olympics

In January 2017, Papadakis/Cizeron won their third continental title at the European Championships in Ostrava, Czech Republic, although they were only 3rd in the short dance behind Ekaterina Bobrova/Dmitri Soloviev and Anna Cappellini/Luca Lanotte. At the 2017 World Figure Skating Championships they came in as underdogs after their previous defeats to Virtue/Moir. They won the free dance portion handily with a new personal best and free dance world record of 119.15 points, but due to another subpar performance in the short dance, lost for a 3rd straight time to Virtue/Moir, taking the silver medal.

=== 2017–18 season: Olympic Silver, World Champion x3 European Champion x 4 ===
For the 2017-18 Grand Prix season, Papadakis and Cizeron were assigned to the Cup of China and the Internationaux de France. At the Cup of China, they set their new short dance personal best of 81.10, a new free dance world record of 119.33 points, and a new overall world record becoming the first team to surpass 200 points with 200.43 points. At the 2017 Internationaux de France, they set another short dance personal best of 81.40, a new free dance personal best and world record of 120.58 points, and a new overall world record of 201.98 points.

Papadakis and Cizeron won their first ever Grand Prix Final, setting another new short program personal best of 82.07 points, and a new overall world record of 202.16. They won their 4th consecutive European Championships ice dancing title, the first team to accomplish that since Marina Klimova/Sergei Ponomarenko from 1989 to 1992, handily winning both programs.

At the 2018 Winter Olympics in Pyeongchang, Papadakis and Cizeron finished second in the short dance with a score of 81.93 despite Papadakis suffering a wardrobe malfunction, and first in the free skate with a world record score of 123.35, to claim the silver medal. Papadakis and Cizeron finished the season at the World Championships, where they earned their third title with world record scores in the short dance, free dance, and overall.

=== 2018–19 season: World Champion x4, European Champion x5 ===
For the 2018-2019 Grand Prix Season, Papadakis and Cizeron were assigned to 2018 NHK Trophy and 2018 Internationaux de France. However, they had to withdraw from NHK Trophy because Cizeron injured his back. Competing at the 2018 Internationaux de France in Grenoble, they won the gold medal and set new world records in both programs and overall. Cizeron stated: "I feel like we shared a very good moment with the audience. It was the first time we've done our free program this year, so we had a little bit of stress, but I feel the audience connected to it."

After winning their fifth consecutive French national title, Papadakis/Cizeron next competed at the 2019 European Championships. They also won this for the fifth straight time, setting new world records in the process. Cizeron expressed satisfaction with the free dance, which he called "almost technically perfect."

They claimed their fourth World title at the 2019 World Championships, again setting new world records in the rhythm dance, free dance, and overall score. Papadakis/Cizeron concluded the season at the 2019 World Team Trophy, setting new world records in both the free skating and overall score, while Team France finished fourth overall.

=== 2019–20 season: European Silver ===
Eschewing the Challenger series, Papadakis/Cizeron debuted their programs at Master's de Patinage before making their first international appearance on the Grand Prix at the 2019 Internationaux de France. They set the world record in the rhythm dance again, eight points ahead of Chock/Bates in second place. They performed their free dance, set mainly to spoken word poetry, and won the event by a wide margin. At 2019 NHK Trophy, they again set the world record for the rhythm dance, with a score of 90.03, becoming the first couple ever to score over 90 points in the segment. Winning the free dance as well, they set another set of world records and qualified first to the Grand Prix Final.

Competing at the Grand Prix Final, Papadakis stumbled out of her twizzle in the rhythm dance's midline step sequence, leading to them scoring 83.83, their lowest rhythm dance score under the post-2018 judging system. They nevertheless narrowly placed first in that segment. They won the free dance decisively with close to their previous world record score, winning their second Grand Prix Final gold.

After collecting another French national title, Papadakis/Cizeron competed at the 2020 European Championships in Graz. After the rhythm dance, they were in first place, separated from Sinitsina/Katsalapov by only 0.05 points. In a close result, they lost the free dance and in the overall result finished behind by 0.14 points, winning the silver medal. This marked the first time anyone had beaten Papadakis/Cizeron since Virtue/Moir at the 2018 Winter Olympics, and the first time they had been defeated in the free dance since the 2016–17 Grand Prix Final. The result was considered a major upset, with Katsalapov remarking "to get anywhere near Gabriella and Guillaume seemed impossible for all the skaters." Papadakis said "we can't always win and we accept that. It is a lesson for us that we probably needed. We knew the competition was very close, so yes, we knew we did not have room for mistakes, and we made them."

The European result generated immediate speculation that Sinitsina/Katsalapov could challenge Papadakis/Cizeron for gold at the 2020 World Championships in Montreal, but these were cancelled as a result of the coronavirus pandemic.

In her 2026 memoir, Papadakis revealed that she had been suffering with depression throughout the 2019–20 season after having had an abortion in early 2019. She also wrote that, shortly before the European Championships, she felt that she could no longer force herself to continue training. Although she wrote that she had expressed her concerns to Cizeron and their coaching team, saying she wanted to withdraw from the event, she ultimately decided to compete as she did not want to disappoint her team.

=== 2020–21 season ===
With the pandemic affecting international travel, the ISU opted to assign the Grand Prix based primarily on geographic location. Papadakis/Cizeron were nonetheless assigned to the 2020 Internationaux de France, and had to travel from Canada to France. The Internationaux was ultimately cancelled due to the pandemic. Both skaters contracted COVID-19 in July 2020, after contact with a third person, resulting in their being away from the ice for three weeks.

On 11 November 2020, L'Équipe reported that Papadakis/Cizeron would skip both the French and European championships for that season to focus on the World Championships in Stockholm. They noted the difficulty of frequently traveling back and forth between countries.

On 20 January 2021, Papadakis/Cizeron announced that they would withdraw from the World Championships and would instead be focusing on the 2021/2022 season and the 2022 Olympics. Cizeron said: "We have never known such a long time without skating. The series of cancellations provoked a climate of uncertainty and doubt that is difficult for all top-level athletes to manage."

=== 2021–22 season: Olympic Champions ===
Entering the Olympic season, Papadakis/Cizeron had not decided whether this would be their final competitive year. Papadakis said that they were "both in that mindset of let's do this season, let's train for the Olympics and then we will see." For the street dance-themed rhythm dance, the duo enlisted outside choreographer Axelle Munezero to work on a program based on waacking, a dance style created in Los Angeles' LGBT clubs during the Disco Era. Papadakis and Cizeron spent six months studying the history of the dance before beginning the choreographic process. Munezero said she approached it as if she was "training dancers that wanted to become waackers and do that as a living."

The team began the year at the 2021 CS Finlandia Trophy, winning the gold medal. Shortly afterward a controversy emerged relating to homophobic comments made by Russian skating judge Alexander Vedenin, who said that due to Cizeron's homosexuality there would always be a lack of chemistry between the partners. The French federation wrote a letter to the International Skating Union in response.

Papadakis/Cizeron were initially assigned to the 2021 Cup of China as their first Grand Prix, but after its cancellation, they were reassigned to the 2021 Gran Premio d'Italia in Turin. They won both segments and the event, taking the gold medal. Cizeron cited improved levels on elements since the Finlandia Trophy as their main takeaway, while saying further improvement was necessary. At their second event, the 2021 Internationaux de France, Papadakis/Cizeron again won gold. Performing at home in their own country, Papadakis said they "appreciate it now after the pandemic that it is possible to have an event with such a big audience." Their results qualified them for the Grand Prix Final, but it was subsequently cancelled due to restrictions prompted by the Omicron variant.

After winning the French national title again, Papadakis/Cizeron were named to the French Olympic team. They chose to withdraw from the 2022 European Championships to avoid the risk of contracting the Omicron variant prior to the Olympics.

Competing at the 2022 Winter Olympics in Beijing, Papadakis/Cizeron began the dance event with a record-setting rhythm dance score of 90.83, 1.98 points ahead of Russian rivals Sinitsina/Katsalapov in second. Papadakis said they were "positively superstitious" about the Olympics as "we've always skated very well in China, and why should it be different this time?" They also won the free dance, and set a new world record for total score (226.98).

Cizeron said that "the silver four years ago made us to want the gold medal more than anything else. I think we've never worked that hard for a specific goal throughout our career. All the gold medals came one after the other without us really wanting them as a precise goal. This year we gathered the courage actually to want to win."

Papadakis and Cizeron concluded the season at the 2022 World Championships, held on home soil in Montpellier. Longtime rivals Sinitsina/Katsalapov were absent due to the International Skating Union banning all Russian athletes due to their country's invasion of Ukraine. They won the rhythm dance by a world record score of 92.73, 3.01 points over training mates Hubbell/Donohue. In the free dance they set another world record (137.09) as well as a world record for total score (229.82), taking their fifth World title. With Hubbell/Donohue taking the silver medal and Chock/Bates the bronze, the entire podium consisted of skaters from the Ice Academy of Montreal. Papadakis remarked "we're so lucky to have been surrounded by our closest friends here on the podium. I think that's very rare and it's what makes it worth it – gold medals, and the event, and the work. I think friendship, in the end, is what stays."

In June 2022, Papadakis and Cizeron announced that they would take a one-year break from competition but would not rule out returning and pushing for the 2026 Winter Olympics. Cizeron said, "if we were stopping for good, we'd say it." On the possibility of continuing, Papadakis added "creating something new coupled with our will as artists would be a reason to come back. You need an inner fire to compete."

Papadakis and Cizeron extended their break for an additional season in April 2023. They officially announced their retirement as competitive ice dancing team on December 3, 2024. During a podcast interview with Championnes du Monde, Papadakis said that the main reason behind her and Cizeron's decision to split was due to her values no longer aligning with that of her partner's, her coaches, and the French Federation of Ice Sports. She further said that she felt the Ice Academy of Montreal (IAM) no longer felt like a healthy environment for her to continue training in.

== Post-competitive career ==
In 2023, Papadakis began choreographing competitive figure skating programs. She has most notably worked with French women's singles skaters Lorine Schild and Léa Serna. In January 2025, she began working as an ice dance analyst for NBC Sports.

In a 2022 French documentary about Papadakis and former ice dance partner Guillaume Cizeron, titled Le couple de feu ("The Fiery Couple"), Papadakis said that she had gotten pregnant only weeks before the 2019 World Championships. She had felt intensely guilty as an elite athlete. She said that when she told her coaching team at the Ice Academy of Montreal (IAM) about her situation, they were unsympathetic and told her to "deal with it and come back." She felt her only choice was to get an abortion. In her 2026 memoir, Papadakis revealed that she had suffered a miscarriage during her and Cizeron's exhibition performance at the 2019 World Championships. It was a delayed effect of the abortion pill she had taken earlier.

In 2024, Papadakis began advocating for the inclusion of same-sex partnerships in competitive figure skating. She said that her goals for this initiative included creating more opportunities for female figure skaters, helping overcome problematic power imbalances in male-female partnerships, and promoting further creativity and representation in ice dance. Teaming up with close friend and former training mate Madison Hubbell, the pair decided to begin skating together professionally. The duo debuted as a team at 2025 Art on Ice.

On 10 January 2026, Papadakis spoke with France Info, describing Cizeron as being a controlling, demanding, and critical ice dance partner. She said, "The idea of being alone with him terrifies me. His attitude throws me off balance. Sometimes he ignores me; sometimes he plays the best friend, as if nothing were wrong […] His coldness chills me to the bone." Papadakis also alleged that, one year before their final separation, Cizeron had threatened to stop skating with her. He was unhappy after she told him of her intention to file a complaint against a French figure skating coach who had raped her as a teenager during the years when the dance couple trained in Lyon.

In her 2026 memoir, Pour ne pas disparaître ("To Not Disappear"), Papadakis went into further detail regarding her and Cizeron's split. She said that she had refused to continue training at IAM due to the center's continued association with fellow ice dancer Nikolaj Sørensen after sexual assault allegations had been made against him in late 2023. Cizeron purportedly refused Papadakis' ultimatum to leave IAM and continued to publicly support Sørensen. He teamed up with Sørensen's former ice dance partner and girlfriend, Laurence Fournier Beaudry, following Sørensen's suspension. "I'm overcome with pure rage," she wrote, describing her reaction to Cizeron's refusal, "A rage I've never allowed myself to feel. I'm overcome with everything I held back when I personally experienced sexual assault. I'm sickened by the thought of being in the same photo with [Nikolaj], of being associated with him – given the protection the academy continues to provide him." As a result, Papadakis left IAM and cut ties with her former ice dance partner and coaches.

On 13 January 2026, two days before Papadakis' memoir was released, Cizeron announced that his lawyers had sent a formal notice to Papadakis and her publisher. He said that Papadakis' allegations against him were false and accused her of orchestrating a "smear campaign" against him. Following Cizeron's cease and desist notice, NBC Sports pulled Papadakis from doing commentary at the 2026 Winter Olympics, stating that her book created a "conflict of interest" because Cizeron and Fournier Beaudry were competing in the ice dance event.

== World record scores ==
Combined total records
Date	Score	Event	Note
26 March 2022	229.82	2022 World Championships	Broken later by Chock/Bates
14 February 2022	226.98	2022 Winter Olympics	
22 November 2019	226.61	2019 NHK Trophy	
12 April 2019	223.13	2019 ISU World Team Trophy in Figure Skating	
23 March 2019	222.65	2019 World Championships	First couple to score over 220 points
26 January 2019	217.98	2019 European Championships	
24 November 2018	216.78	2018 Internationaux de France	Papadakis/Cizeron became the first-ever team to score a combined total of over 210.
24 March 2018	207.20	2018 World Championships	Historical world record.
20 February 2018	205.28	2018 Winter Olympics	Broken minutes later by Virtue/Moir.
20 January 2018	203.16	2018 European Championships	
9 December 2017	202.16	2017–18 Grand Prix of Figure Skating Final	
18 November 2017	201.98	2017 Internationaux de France	
4 November 2017	200.43	2017 Cup of China	Papadakis/Cizeron became the first team to score above 200 points.
Free dance records
Date	Score	Event	Note
26 March 2022	137.09	2022 World Championships	Broken later by Chock/Bates
23 November 2019	136.58	2019 NHK Trophy	
12 April 2019	135.82	2019 ISU World Team Trophy in Figure Skating	
23 March 2019	134.23	2019 World Championships	
26 January 2019	133.19	2019 European Championships	
24 November 2018	132.65	2018 Internationaux de France	Papadakis/Cizeron became the first-ever team to score over 130 in the free dance.
24 March 2018	123.47	2018 World Championships	Historical world record.
20 February 2018	123.35	2018 Winter Olympics	
20 January 2018	121.87	2018 European Championships	
18 November 2017	120.58	2017 Internationaux de France	Papadakis/Cizeron became the first team to score above 120 points in the free dance.
4 November 2017	119.33	2017 Cup of China	
1 April 2017	119.15	2017 World Championships	
31 March 2016	118.17	2016 World Championships	
Short dance records
Date	Score	Event	Note
25 March 2022	92.73	2022 World Championships	Broken later by Chock/Bates
12 February 2022	90.83	2022 Winter Olympics	
22 November 2019	90.03	2019 NHK Trophy	
1 November 2019	88.69	2019 Internationaux de France	
22 March 2019	88.42	2019 World Championships	
25 January 2019	84.79	2019 European Championships	
23 November 2018	84.13	2018 Internationaux de France	
23 March 2018	83.73	2018 World Championships	Historical world record.

== Programs ==
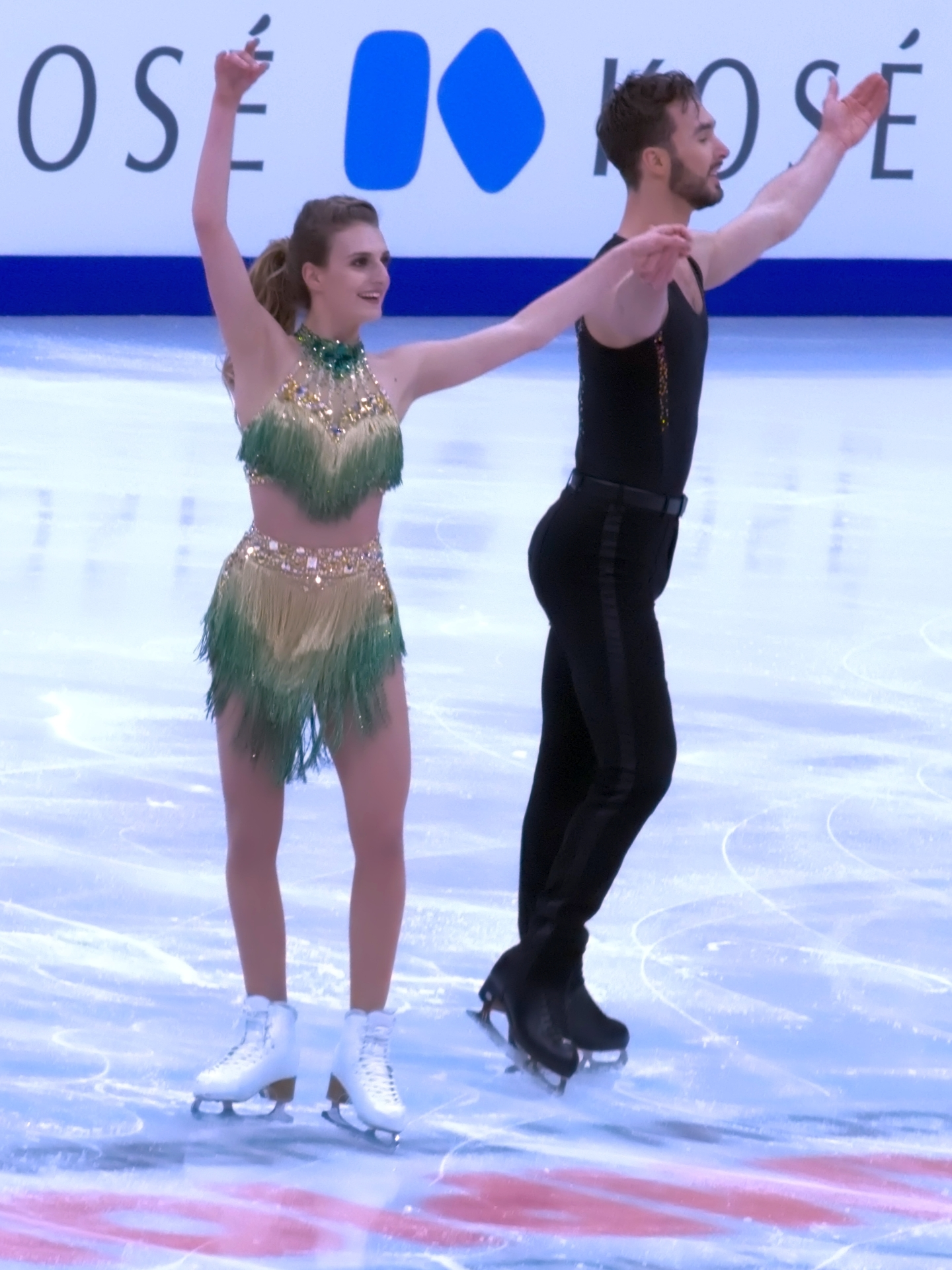
Papadakis/Cizeron at the 2018 European Championships

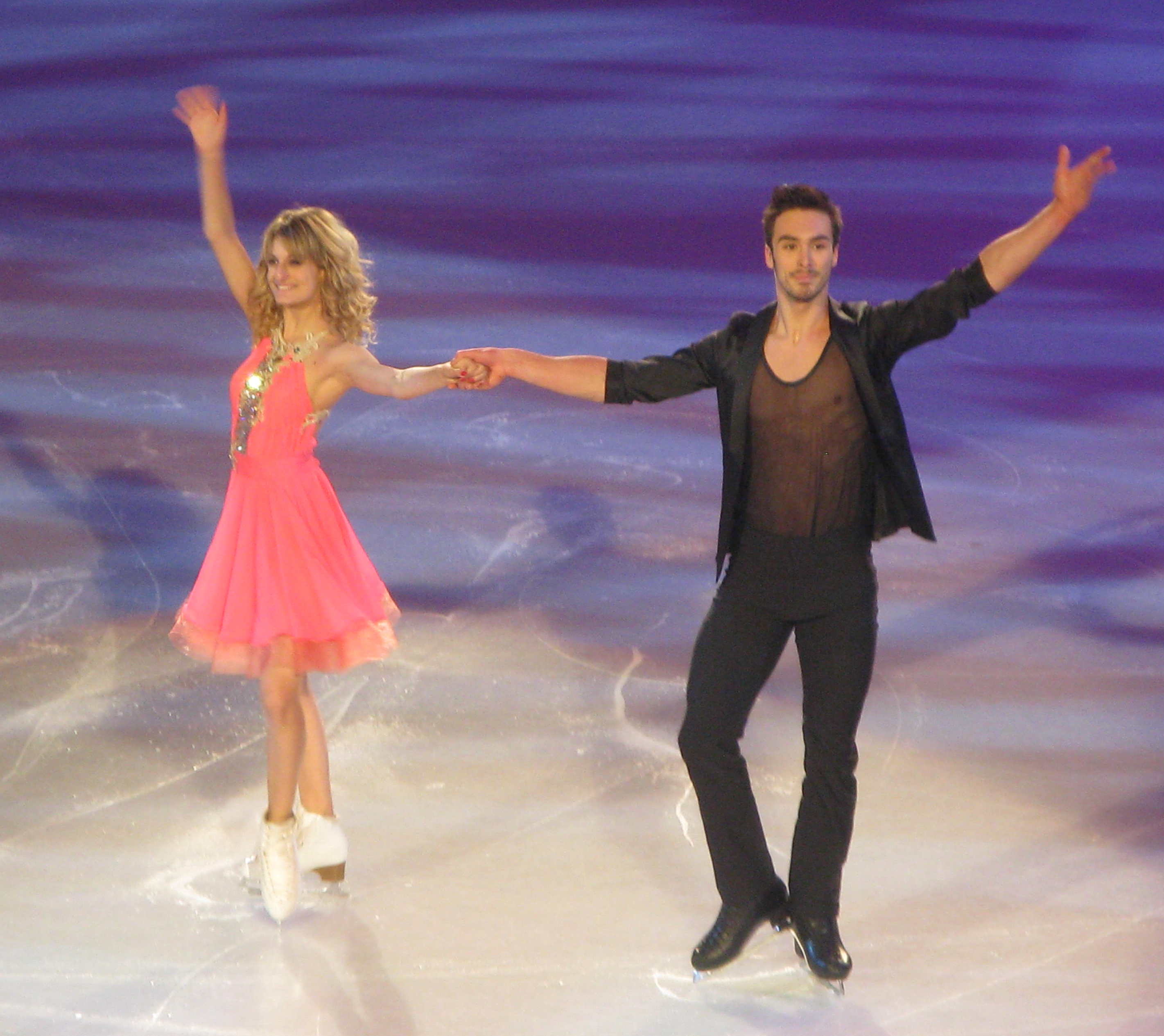
Papadakis/Cizeron at the 2013 Trophée Éric Bompard

(with Cizeron)

Season	Short dance	Free dance	Exhibition
2021–2022	Hip Hop: Made to Love; Blues: U Move, I Move by John Legend choreo. by Axelle Munezero & Kim Gingras & Samuel Chouinard & Marie-France Dubreuil; Hip Hop: Made to Love; Blues: You & I by John Legend choreo. by Axelle Munezero & Kim Gingras & Samuel Chouinard & Marie-France Dubreuil	Élégie (tango) by Gabriel Fauré choreo. by Saxon Fraser & Marie-France Dubreuil	Avec le temps by Léo Ferré
2020–2021	The Artist by Ludovic Bource	Jalousie 'Tango Tzigane' by Jacob Gade	
2019–2020	Disco: I Can Do Anything Better Than You Can by S. Linzer & D. Wolfert arranged by Maxime Rodriguez; Blues: Fame by Michael Gore, Dean Pitchford arranged by Maxime Rodriguez and Ludivine Amado; Disco: Fame by Michael Gore, Dean Pitchford performed by Irene Cara (from Fame) choreo. by Romain Haguenauer & Samuel Chouinard	Danny by Ólafur Arnalds; Find Me by Forest Blakk; Suspects by Ólafur Arnalds choreo. by Marie-France Dubreuil & Samuel Chouinard	For Island Fires and Family; Power Over Me by Dermot Kennedy
2018–2019	Tango: Oblivion by Astor Piazzolla performed by Gidon Kremer; Primavera Porteña by Astor Piazzolla performed by Gidon Kremer choreo. by Christopher Dean	Duet by Rachael Yamagata, Ray LaMontagne; Sunday Afternoon by Rachael Yamagata choreo. by Stéphane Lambiel, Marie-France Dubreuil	Shape of You; Thinking Out Loud by Ed Sheeran remastered by Karl Hugo choreo. by Christopher Dean; For Island Fires and Family; Power Over Me by Dermot Kennedy
2017–2018	Shape of You; Thinking Out Loud by Ed Sheeran remastered by Karl Hugo choreo. by Christopher Dean	Moonlight Sonata by Ludwig van Beethoven choreo. by Marie-France Dubreuil; Adagio sostenuto performed by Steve Anderson; Presto agitato	Gravity by John Mayer; Shape of You; Thinking Out Loud by Ed Sheeran remastered by Karl Hugo choreo. by Christopher Dean; To Build a Home (gala version) by The Cinematic Orchestra; Pray You Catch Me by Beyoncé
2016–2017	Blues: Bittersweet by Rene Liebau, Maxim Illion perf. by Club des Belugas; Swing: Diga Diga Doo by Dorothy Fields, Jimmy McHugh perf. by Big Bad Voodoo Daddy	Stillness by Nest; Oddudua by Aldo Lopez Gavilan; Happiness Does Not Wait by Ólafur Arnalds	Belvedere by James Gruntz choreo. by Samuel Chouinard
2015–2016	Waltz: Charms (from W.E.) by Abel Korzeniowski; March: Composition by Karl Hugo; Waltz and March: Charms (from W.E.) by Abel Korzeniowski	Rain, In Your Black Eyes by Ezio Bosso; To Build a Home by The Cinematic Orchestra	DKLA by Troye Sivan; Can't Feel My Face by The Weeknd choreo. by Samuel Chouinard; Belvedere by James Gruntz choreo. by Samuel Chouinard; Adagio from Concerto No. 23 by Wolfgang Amadeus Mozart
2014–2015	Paso doble: Escobilla; Flamenco: Farruca by Cristina Hoyos	Adagio from Concerto No. 23 by Wolfgang Amadeus Mozart	Take Me to Church by Hozier; À Distance by Sylvain Cossette; All by Myself performed by Celine Dion; Sway by Luis Demetrio
2013–2014	Quickstep: Cool Cat in Town by Tape Five; Foxtrot: Burlesque	Iron; Run Boy Run by Woodkid; Brotsjor by Ólafur Arnalds	Million Dollar Man by Lana Del Rey; Déshabillez-moi
2012–2013	Blues: Minnie the Moocher; The Dirty Boogie	Money; Hey You by Pink Floyd	Million Dollar Man by Lana Del Rey
2011–2012	Rumba: Mondo Bongo by Joe Strummer & The Mescaleros; Cha Cha: Oye Cómo Va by Celia Cruz	Elvis Presley medley: Jailhouse Rock; So Glad You're Mine; Blue Suede Shoes	Je dois m'en aller by Niagara
2010–2011	Waltz: C'était Salement Romantique by Cœur de pirate	A Fuego Lento by Horacio Salgan; Rapsodia de Anabal by José Libatella	

== Competitive highlights ==
GP: Grand Prix; CS: Challenger Series; JGP: Junior Grand Prix

With Cizeron

International
Event	13–14	14–15	15–16	16–17	17–18	18–19	19–20	20–21	21–22
Olympics					2nd				1st
Worlds	13th	1st	1st	2nd	1st	1st	C	WD	1st
Europeans	15th	1st	1st	1st	1st	1st	2nd		WD
GP Final		3rd		2nd	1st		1st		C
GP Cup of China		1st			1st				C
GP France	5th	1st	WD	1st	1st	1st	1st	C	1st
GP Italy									1st
GP NHK Trophy			WD	2nd		WD	1st		
GP Rostelecom	7th								
CS Autumn Classic		1st							WD
CS Finlandia					1st				1st
Cup of Nice	1st								
Golden Spin	4th								
National
French Champ.	2nd	1st	1st	1st	1st	1st	1st	WD	1st
Masters	3rd	1st		1st	1st		1st		
Team events
World Team Trophy		6th T 2nd P				4th T 1st P			

International: Junior
Event	09–10	10–11	11–12	12–13
Junior Worlds	22nd	12th	5th	2nd
JGP Final				2nd
JGP Austria		3rd		1st
JGP Estonia			4th	
JGP France		4th		1st
JGP Poland			4th	
JGP USA	15th			
NRW Trophy				2nd J
Trophy of Lyon		1st J	1st J	1st J
Santa Claus Cup			2nd	
National: Junior or Novice
French Junior	1st J	1st J		1st J
Masters	WD	1st J	1st J	1st J

== Detailed results ==
Small medals for short and free programs awarded only at ISU Championships. At team events, medals awarded for team results only.

Personal Bests are in bold. World record scores are in italics.

With Cizeron

ISU personal best scores in the +5/-5 GOE System
Segment	Type	Score	Event
Total	**TSS**	**229.82**	2022 World Championships
Rhythm dance	**TSS**	**92.73**	2022 World Championships
Rhythm dance	TES	53.16	2022 World Championships
Rhythm dance	PCS	39.57	2022 World Championships
Free dance	**TSS**	**137.09**	2022 World Championships
Free dance	TES	77.40	2019 NHK Trophy
Free dance	PCS	59.70	2022 World Championships

ISU personal bests in the +3/-3 GOE System (from 2010–11)
Segment	Type	Score	Event
Total	**TSS**	**207.20**	2018 World Championships
Short dance	**TSS**	**83.73**	2018 World Championships
Short dance	TES	44.37	2018 World Championships
Short dance	PCS	39.36	2018 World Championships
Free dance	**TSS**	**123.47**	2018 World Championships
Free dance	TES	63.98	2018 Winter Olympics
Free dance	PCS	59.53	2018 World Championships

=== Senior career ===
Record in 2017-2018 Season marks the historical world records set before the introduction of the +5/-5 GOE judging system

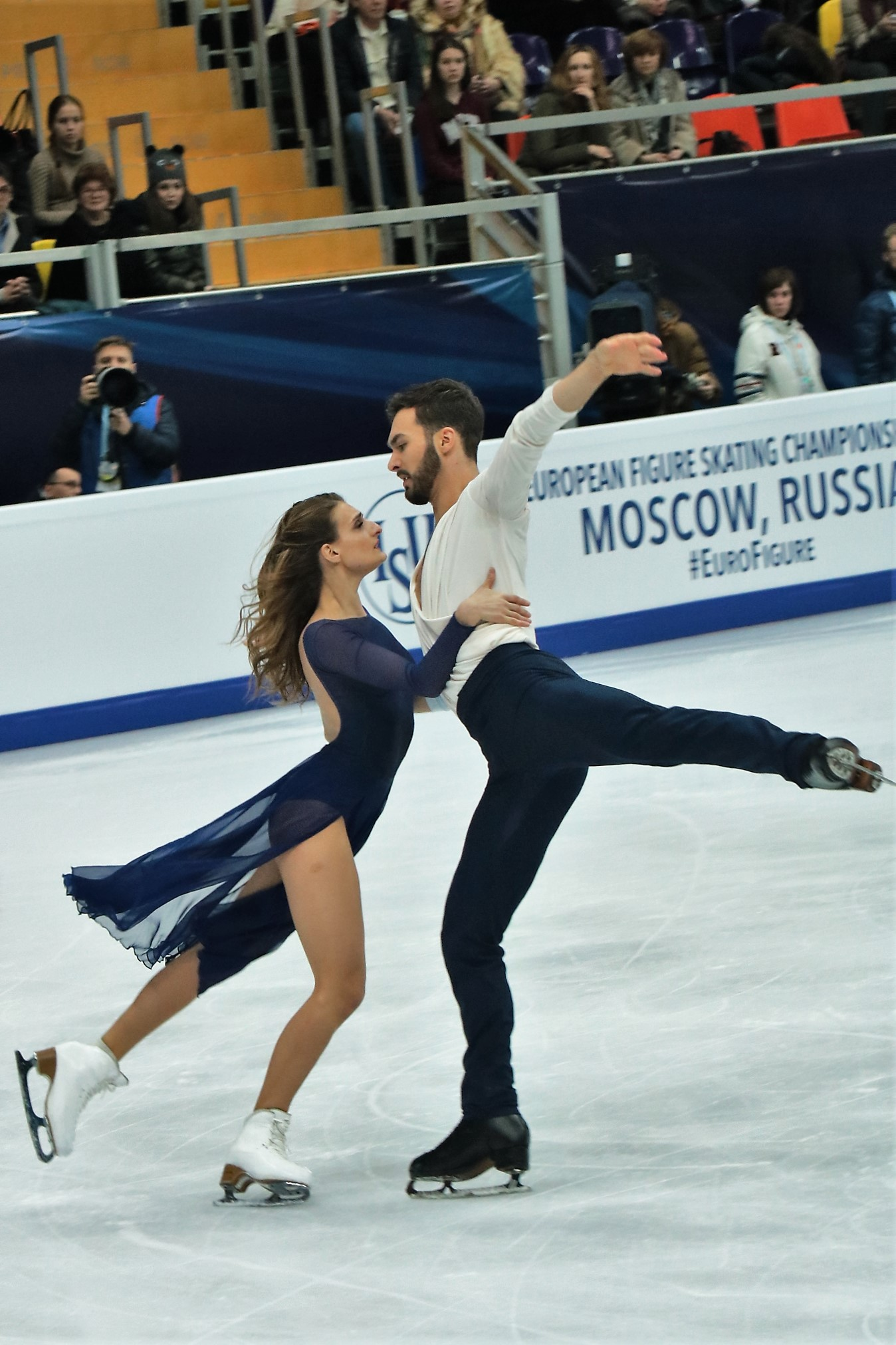
Papadakis/Cizeron at the 2018 European Championships

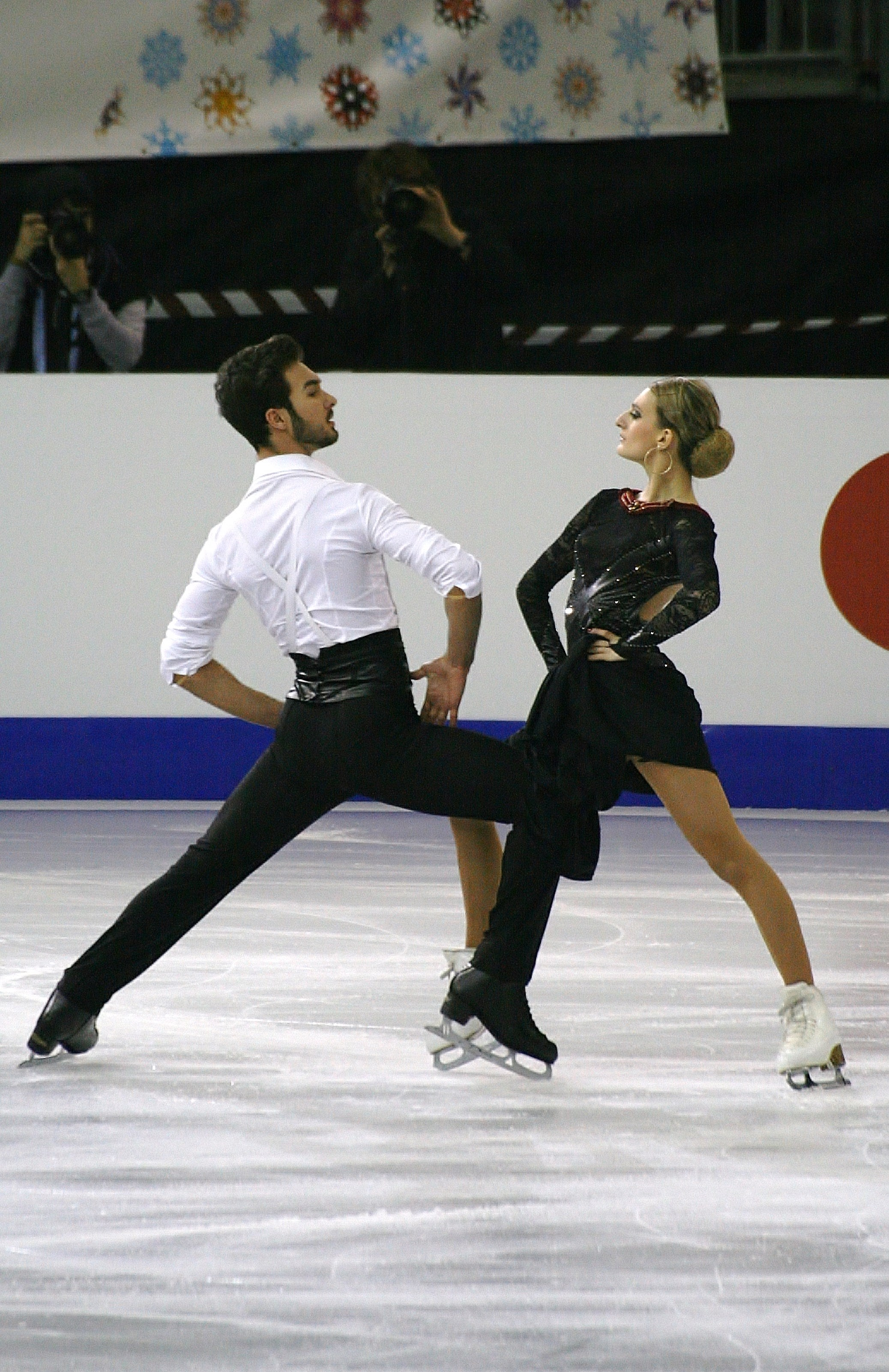
Papadakis/Cizeron at the 2014–15 Grand Prix Final

**2021–22 season**
Date	Event	RD	FD	Total
21–27 March 2022	2022 World Championships	1; **92.73**	1; **137.09**	1; **229.82**
12–14 February 2022	2022 Winter Olympics	1; 90.83	1; 136.15	1; 226.98
16–18 December 2021	2022 French Championships	1; 94.48	1; 132.48	1; 226.96
19–21 November 2021	2021 Internationaux de France	1; 89.08	1; 132.17	1; 221.25
5–7 November 2021	2021 Gran Premio d'Italia	1; 87.45	1; 132.61	1; 220.06
7–10 October 2021	2021 CS Finlandia Trophy	1; 85.58	1; 131.96	1; 217.54
2019–20 season
Date	Event	RD	FD	Total
20–26 January 2020	2020 European Championships	1; 88.78	2; 131.50	2; 220.28
19–21 December 2019	2020 French Championships	1; 91.85	1; 137.22	1; 229.07
5–8 December 2019	2019–20 Grand Prix Final	1; 83.83	1; 136.02	1; 219.85
22–24 November 2019	2019 NHK Trophy	1; 90.03	1; 136.58	1; 226.61
1–3 November 2019	2019 Internationaux de France	1; 88.69	1; 133.55	1; 222.24
2018–19 season
Date	Event	RD	FD	Total
11–14 April 2019	2019 World Team Trophy	1; 87.31	1; 135.82	4T/1P; 223.13
22–23 March 2019	2019 World Championships	1; 88.42	1; 134.23	1; 222.65
21–27 January 2019	2019 European Championships	1; 84.79	1; 133.19	1; 217.98
13–15 December 2018	2019 French Championships	1; 85.89	1; 135.06	1; 220.95
23–25 November 2018	2018 Internationaux de France	1; 84.13	1; 132.65	1; 216.78
2017–18 season
Date	Event	SD	FD	Total
19–25 March 2018	2018 World Championships	1; 83.73	1; 123.47	1; 207.20
19–20 February 2018	2018 Winter Olympics	2; 81.93	1; 123.35	2; 205.28
15–21 January 2018	2018 European Championships	1; 81.29	1; 121.87	1; 203.16
14–16 December 2017	2018 French Championships	1; 79.01	1; 123.10	1; 202.11
7–10 December 2017	2017–18 Grand Prix Final	1; 82.07	1; 120.09	1; 202.16
17–19 November 2017	2017 Internationaux de France	1; 81.40	1; 120.58	1; 201.98
3–5 November 2017	2017 Cup of China	1; 81.10	1; 119.33	1; 200.43
6–8 October 2017	2017 CS Finlandia Trophy	1; 78.09	1; 110.16	1; 188.25
2016–17 season
Date	Event	SD	FD	Total
29 Mar. – 2 Apr. 2017	2017 World Championships	2; 76.89	1; 119.15	2; 196.04
25–29 January 2017	2017 European Championships	3; 75.48	1; 114.19	1; 189.67
15–17 December 2016	2017 French Championships	1; 82.03	1; 120.60	1; 202.63
8–11 December 2016	2016–17 Grand Prix Final	3; 77.86	2; 114.95	2; 192.81
25–27 November 2016	2016 NHK Trophy	2; 75.60	2; 111.06	2; 186.66
11–13 November 2016	2016 Trophée de France	1; 78.26	1; 115.24	1; 193.40
2015–16 season
Date	Event	SD	FD	Total
28 Mar. – 3 Apr. 2016	2016 World Championships	1; 76.29	1; 118.17	1; 194.46
26–31 January 2016	2016 European Championships	2; 70.74	1; 111.97	1; 182.71
17–19 December 2015	2016 French Championships	1; 73.60	1; 110.30	1; 183.90
2014–15 season
Date	Event	SD	FD	Total
16–19 April 2015	2015 World Team Trophy	3; 70.86	1; 111.06	6T/2P; 181.92
23–29 March 2015	2015 World Championships	4; 71.94	1; 112.34	1; 184.28
26 Jan. – 1 Feb. 2015	2015 European Championships	1; 71.06	1; 108.91	1; 179.97
18–21 December 2014	2015 French Championships	1; 71.40	1; 109.83	1; 181.23
11–14 December 2014	2014–15 Grand Prix Final	5; 61.48	3; 100.91	3; 162.39
21–23 November 2014	2014 Trophée Éric Bompard	1; 64.06	1; 102.60	1; 166.06
7–9 November 2014	2014 Cup of China	3; 62.12	1; 98.00	1; 160.12
15–16 October 2014	2014 SC Autumn Classic	1; 59.74	1; 90.46	1; 150.60
2013–14 season
Date	Event	SD	FD	Total
24–30 March 2014	2014 World Championships	15; 55.11	13; 86.38	13; 141.49
13–19 January 2014	2014 European Championships	15; 53.33	14; 78.24	15; 131.57
12–15 December 2014	2014 French Championships	2; 61.79	2; 92.45	2; 154.24
5–8 December 2014	2013 Golden Spin of Zagreb	4; 53.08	4; 81.52	4; 134.60
22–24 November 2013	2013 Rostelecom Cup	8; 44.49	7; 79.78	7; 124.27
15–17 November 2013	2013 Trophée Éric Bompard	5; 58.10	5; 85.16	5; 143.26
23–27 October 2013	2013 Cup of Nice	1; 60.05	1; 87.88	1; 147.93

=== Junior career ===
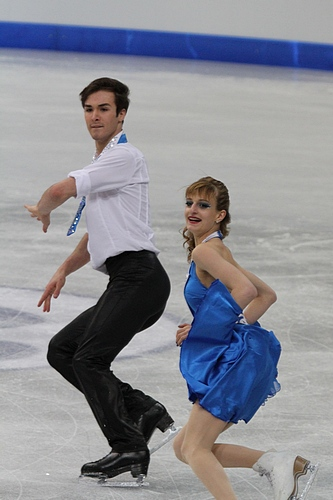
Papadakis/Cizeron at the 2012 World Junior Championships

2012–13 season
Date	Event	SD	FD	Total
27 Feb. – 3 Mar. 2013	2013 World Junior Championships	2; 61.58	3; 81.68	2; 143.26
11–13 January 2013	2012 Trophy of Lyon	1; 61.62	1; 82.71	1; 144.33
6–9 December 2012	2012 JGP Final	2; 54.79	2; 84.42	2; 139.21
2–4 November 2012	2012 NRW Trophy	2; 58.36	1; 87.00	2; 145.36
13–14 September 2012	2012 JGP Austria	1; 59.19	1; 82.89	1; 142.08
24–25 August 2012	2012 JGP France	2; 52.25	1; 78.88	1; 131.13
2011–12 season
Date	Event	SD	FD	Total
27 Feb. – 4 Mar. 2012	2012 World Junior Championships	4; 58.09	5; 80.61	5; 138.70
12–15 October 2011	2011 JGP Estonia	5; 49.89	3; 72.90	5; 122.79
14–17 September 2011	2011 JGP Poland	3; 52.13	5; 68.69	5; 120.82
2010–11 season
Date	Event	SD	FD	Total
28 Feb. – 6 Mar. 2011	2011 World Junior Championships	15; 43.97	9; 71.59	12; 115.56
14–17 September 2011	2010 JGP Austria	3; 49.93	5; 65.21	3; 115.14
25–28 August 2010	2010 JGP France	4; 43.89	2; 63.40	4; 107.29

== Bibliography ==
- Pour ne pas disparaître (2026)
