= Don't Say Goodbye =

Don't Say Goodbye may refer to:

- Don't Say Goodbye (album), by Strawbs, 1987
- "Don't Say Goodbye" (Magnum, P.I.), a 1981 television episode
- Kabhi Alvida Naa Kehna (lit. 'Don't Say Goodbye'), a 2006 Indian Hindi-language film by Karan Johar

== Songs ==
- "Don't Say Goodbye" (Human Nature song), 1997
- "Don't Say Good-Bye" (Melon Kinenbi song), 2009
- "Don't Say Goodbye" (Paulina Rubio song), 2002
- "Don't Say Goodbye" (Rick Astley song), 1987
- "Don't Say Goodbye" (Sérgio Mendes song), 2014
- Kabhi Alvida Naa Kehna (soundtrack album), soundtrack by Shankar–Ehsaan–Loy for the 2006 film
- "Don't Say Goodbye", by Aaron Carter from Love, 2018
- "Don't Say Goodbye", by the Bee Gees, B-side of the single "Peace of Mind", 1964
- "Don't Say Goodbye", by Crosby, Stills, Nash & Young from American Dream, 1988
- "Don't Say Goodbye", by Christopher Cross from Every Turn of the World, 1985
- "Don't Say Goodbye", by Davichi from Love Delight, 2011
- "GLaDOS' Song", also known as "Don't Say Goodbye", a song written by Ellen McLain for Portal 2 but not included in the game, released 2015
- "Don't Say Goodbye", by Milk Inc., 2014
- "Don't Say Goodbye", by the Moonglows, 1957
- "Don't Say Goodbye", by Olly Murs from Olly Murs, 2010
- "Don't Say Goodbye", by Alok & Ilkay Sencan featuring Tove Lo, single, 2020
