= Kank (disambiguation) =

Kank is an extinct genus of dinosaur.

Kank may also refer to:

- Harriet Alexander Field, with KANK as the ICAO airport code
- Kabhi Alvida Naa Kehna, abbreviated as "KANK"
  - Kabhi Alvida Naa Kehna (soundtrack album)
- Kutná Hora, Kaňk being one of 12 municipal parts
