= Glory (Common and John Legend song) =

Single by Common and John Legend

from the album Selma soundtrack
- Released: December 11, 2014
- Recorded: 2014
- Genre: Hip hop; soul
- Length: 4:32
- Label: ARTium; Def Jam; GOOD; Columbia
- Songwriters: John Stephens; Lonnie Lynn; Che Smith
- Producer: John Legend

John Legend singles chronology
"Don't Say Goodbye" (2014)	"Glory" (2014)	"Lay Me Down" (2015)

Common singles chronology
"Diamonds" (2014)	"Glory" (2014)	"Real People" (2016)

"Glory" is a song by American rapper Common and American singer John Legend. It was written by both performers, along with rapper Rhymefest. It was released on December 11, 2014, by Columbia Records, as the theme song from the 2014 film Selma, which portrays the 1965 Selma to Montgomery marches. Common also co-starred in the film as Civil Rights Movement leader James Bevel.

Commercially, the song peaked at number 49 on the US Billboard Hot 100. A music video for the song was directed by Paramount Pictures and was released on January 12, 2015. The song won Best Original Song at the 87th Academy Awards (2015) and the 72nd Golden Globe Awards (2015), as well as Best Song Written for Visual Media at the 58th Annual Grammy Awards (2016).

== Awards ==
Year	Awards Ceremony	Award	Result
2014	African-American Film Critics Association	Best Music	Won
2014	Denver Film Critics Society	Best Original Song	Nominated
2015	Academy Awards	Best Original Song	Won
2015	BET Awards	Best Collaboration	Won
2015	BET Awards	Video of the Year	Nominated
2015	Black Reel Awards	Outstanding Original Song	Won
2015	Critics' Choice Movie Awards	Best Song	Won
2015	Georgia Film Critics Association	Best Original Song	Won
2015	Golden Globe Award	Best Original Song	Won
2015	Houston Film Critics Society	Best Original Song	Nominated
2015	Iowa Film Critics	Best Song	Runner-Up
2016	Grammy Award	Best Song Written for Visual Media	Won
2016	Grammy Award	Best Rap Song	Nominated
2016	Grammy Award	Best Rap/Sung Collaboration	Nominated

== Music video ==
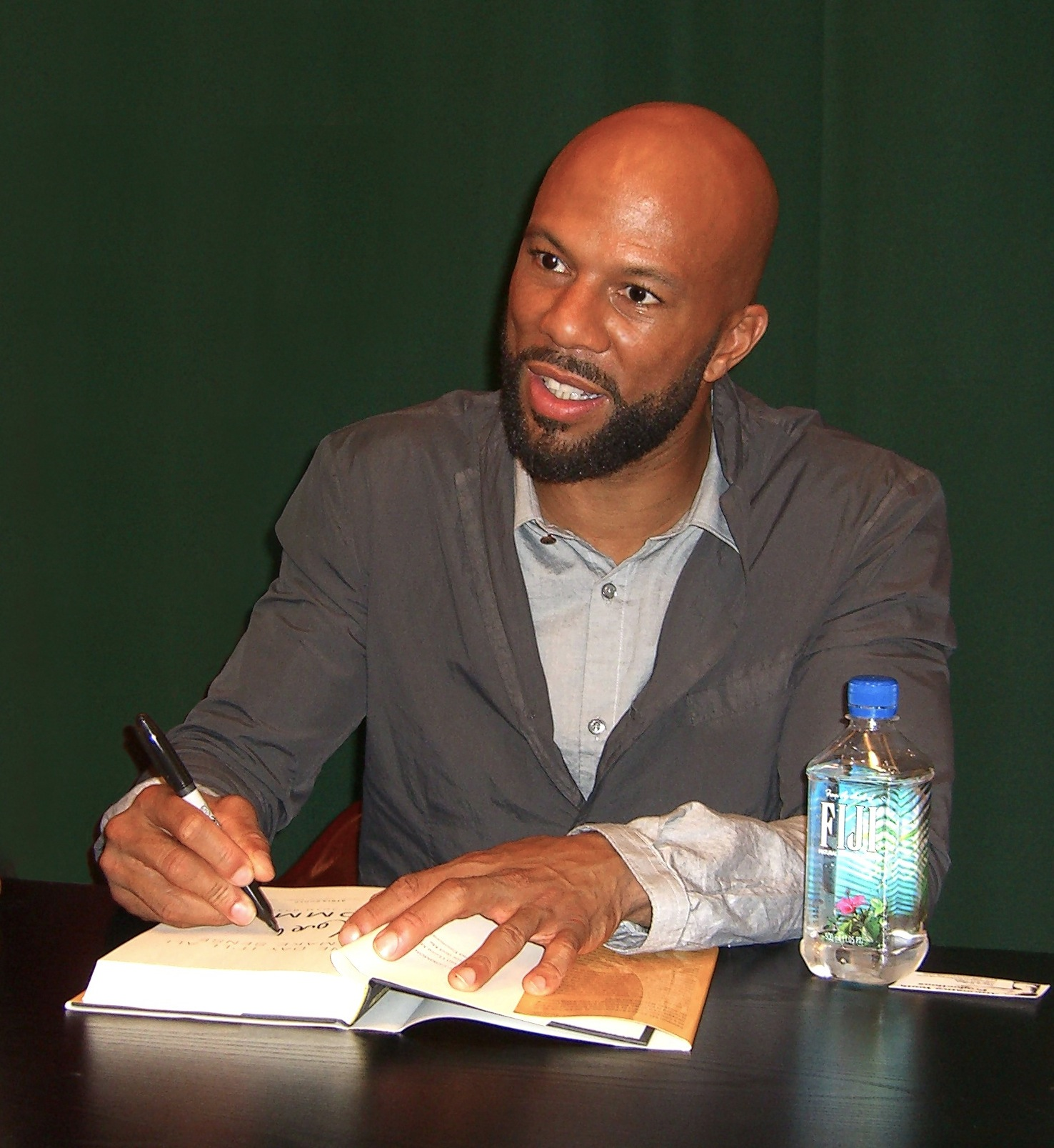
Common co-starred in the film Selma, and sang "Glory" as the end-credits rolled.

The music video was directed by Paramount Pictures. It was put on Common's official Vevo account on January 12, 2015. The video stars Legend and Common. The video, which includes footage from the film, begins with Legend playing the piano and then singing, with Common rapping in a different location.

== Live performances ==
"Glory" was performed by Legend and Common on the American morning television show Good Morning America on January 5, 2015.

On February 8, 2015, the duo performed the song as culmination to the 57th Annual Grammy Awards ceremonies held at the Staples Center in Los Angeles, California.

Legend and Common performed "Glory" during the 87th Academy Awards show on February 22, 2015 using a stage-setting of Selma's Edmund Pettus Bridge. The song won the Oscar for Best Original Song.

In October 2015, Common surprised a student choir in Compton, California with a live performance of "Glory" in support of My Brother's Keeper Challenge. The promotion was run by Omaze, a private internet company that raises funds for charity through online auctions and merchandise sales.

A year later on October 26, 2016, Common performed the song with Yolanda Adams at the White House on the South Lawn for BET Presents: Love and Happiness: An Obama Celebration.

It was performed by Legend and Common, backed by a choir, at the 2020 Democratic National Convention. They also played it during a Joe Biden rally at Pennsylvania, a day before the 2020 United States presidential election.

It was performed by Common and Legend during the opening ceremonies of the Barack Obama Presidential Center on June 18th, 2026

== Commercial performance ==
"Glory" debuted on the Billboard Hot 100 at number 92. It became Common's fourth charted song of his own, and peaked at number 49.

== Charts ==
Chart (2015)	Peak position
Australia (ARIA)	62
Austria (Ö3 Austria Top 40)	47
Belgium (Ultratip Bubbling Under Flanders)	74
Belgium (Ultratip Bubbling Under Wallonia)	40
France (SNEP)	65
Ireland (IRMA)	39
Spain (Promusicae)	25
Switzerland (Schweizer Hitparade)	38
UK Singles (Official Charts)	62
US Billboard Hot 100	49
US Hot R&B/Hip-Hop Songs (Billboard)	18

== Release history ==
Country	Date	Format	Label	Ref.
United States	December 11, 2014	Digital download	ARTium; Def Jam; GOOD; Columbia	
United Kingdom	December 11, 2014	Digital download	ARTium; Def Jam; GOOD; Columbia	

== See also ==
- Civil rights movement in popular culture
