= All of Me (John Legend song) =

2013 single by John Legend

Single by John Legend

from the album Love in the Future
- B-side: "Made to Love"
- Released: August 12, 2013
- Recorded: 2013
- Genre: Pop; soul
- Length: 4:30 (album version); 2:57 (radio edit)
- Label: GOOD; Columbia
- Songwriters: John Stephens; Toby Gad
- Producers: Dave Tozer; John Legend

John Legend singles chronology
"Made to Love" (2013)	"All of Me" (2013)	"You & I (Nobody in the World)" (2014)

Music video
- "All of Me" on YouTube

"All of Me" is a song by American singer John Legend from his fourth studio album Love in the Future (2013). It is dedicated to Legend's wife Chrissy Teigen. "All of Me" first aired on American mainstream urban radio as the album's third single on August 12, 2013.

On the week ending May 17, 2014, it peaked at number one on the Billboard Hot 100, becoming his first number-one single in the United States. It knocked off "Happy" by Pharrell Williams, which had spent 10 weeks at number one. The song peaked at number two in the United Kingdom, South Africa and New Zealand and topped the charts in Australia, Canada, Ireland, Portugal, Sweden, Switzerland and the Netherlands. It became the second best-selling song of 2014 in the United States with 4.67 million copies sold for the year, as well as the third best-selling song in the United Kingdom. "All of Me" was the third best-selling song of 2014 with 12.3 million equivalent-units worldwide (sales plus streaming), according to the IFPI.

A remix of the song (Tiësto's Birthday Treatment remix), featuring EDM artist Tiësto, was released in January 2014 and won the 2015 Grammy Award for Best Remixed Recording, Non-Classical, while another remix was done in March of that year by trance artist Dash Berlin. A live version of the song was nominated for Best Pop Solo Performance, losing to Williams' "Happy".

== Background and composition ==
"All of Me" is a piano ballad, which was inspired by his then-fiancée, now wife, model Chrissy Teigen. The couple met in 2007 on the set of his video for "Stereo". They were then married on September 14, 2013. The song was produced by Dave Tozer and Legend himself. It is a simple, modest proposal set against delicate keys.

Sheet music for "All of Me" shows the key of A♭ major with a slow tempo of 63 beats per minute. Vocals span from C_{3} to B♭_{4}.

== Release and promotion ==
In June 2013, Legend premiered "All of Me" during a performance on Oprah Winfrey's Oprah's Next Chapter. On August 6, 2013, the full song was released to iTunes along with the pre-order for Love in the Future. "All of Me" impacted American mainstream urban radio as the third single from Love in the Future on August 12, 2013.

Dutch electronic producer Tiësto released a remix of the song in January 2014. A country-influenced duet version of "All of Me" with Jennifer Nettles, featuring Hunter Hayes on guitar, was released in June 2014.

== Commercial performance ==
After being stationary at number two for six weeks, "All of Me" finally reached number one on the US Billboard Hot 100 on the chart dated May 17, 2014. This was Legend's first Hot 100 number one single, almost 10 years since his first appearance on the chart. That was the longest wait for an artist's first number-one song from their first chart appearance since Snoop Dogg waited 10 years and 10 months for his. "All of Me" became the second best-selling song of 2014 in the United States with 4.67 million copies sold for the year. The song spent three weeks at number one before being dethroned by Iggy Azalea's "Fancy" featuring Charli XCX. Additionally, "All of Me" spent 23 consecutive weeks in the Billboard Hot 100's top 10 and spent an overall 59 non-consecutive weeks on the Billboard Hot 100 chart. As of April 2016, "All of Me" has sold 5,878,000 copies cumulatively in the United States.

In the United Kingdom, "All of Me" peaked at number two on the UK Singles Chart, and it became the third best-selling song of 2014 in the UK. As of February 2016, the song has sold 1.18 million copies in the UK.

== Critical reception ==
"All of Me" was met with generally positive reviews from music critics. Ken Capobianco of The Boston Globe named the song the album's "essential track". Ryan Patrick of Exclaim! said the song, shows "Legend's current commercially friendly, sentimental sound." Jon Dolan of Rolling Stone called the song a "mountainous piano crusher". Julia Leconte of NOW stated that Legend's voice shines in the song. Molloy Woodcraft of The Guardian also praised Legend's vocal talents on the song. A live rendition of the song was nominated for Grammy Award for Best Pop Solo Performance at the 57th Annual Grammy Awards.

== Live performances ==
On August 20, 2013, Legend performed the song live on the Late Show with David Letterman. On August 27, 2013, Legend performed the song at The Box in New York City. On September 2, 2013, Legend performed the song on Jimmy Kimmel Live! along with the album's second single "Made to Love". On October 10, 2013, Legend performed the song during his appearance on The Wendy Williams Show. The song was performed by Legend at the 56th Grammy Awards on January 26, 2014. The song was also performed as a duet with Taylor Swift during her 1989 World Tour.

== Music video ==
The song's music video was shot in Italy just days before Legend's wedding, featuring his fiancée, model Chrissy Teigen. The video ends with footage from their actual wedding in Lake Como, Italy. On September 12, 2013, the first image from the music video was released. On October 2, 2013, the full version of the Nabil Elderkin-directed black and white music video for "All of Me" was released through Vevo on his YouTube channel. The video was meant to bring the relationship full circle, as he chose the man who originally introduced them to each other, Elderkin, to direct it.

A duet version of the song with accompanying music video was filmed with violinist Lindsey Stirling and released on YouTube on October 26, 2013.

In November 2015, the YouTube video's title mysteriously changed from 'All of Me' to 'One Last Time' and then changed back. The same happened on Spotify and Google Play. There has been no explanation for this incident.

As of September 2025, the music video has received over 2.5 billion views and over 13 million likes on YouTube.

== Track listing ==
- Digital download
1. "All of Me" (album version) – 4:30
- Digital download — remix
1. "All of Me" (Tiësto's Birthday Treatment remix) (radio edit) – 4:11
- Digital download
1. "All of Me" (featuring Jennifer Nettles and Hunter Hayes) – 4:20
- CD single
1. "All of Me" – 4:30
2. "Made to Love" – 4:00

== Charts ==
=== Weekly charts ===
Chart (2013–2015)	Peak position
Australia (ARIA)	1
Austria (Ö3 Austria Top 40)	4
Belgium (Ultratop 50 Flanders)	3
Belgium (Ultratop Flanders Urban)	1
Belgium (Ultratop 50 Wallonia)	11
Canada Hot 100 (Billboard)	1
Czech Republic Airplay (ČNS IFPI)	15
Czech Republic Singles Digital (ČNS IFPI)	3
Denmark (Tracklisten)	2
Finland (Suomen virallinen lista)	5
France (SNEP)	4
Germany (GfK)	13
Hungary (Rádiós Top 40)	16
Hungary (Single Top 40)	6
Ireland (IRMA)	1
Italy (FIMI)	8
Israel International Airplay (Media Forest)	4
Netherlands (Dutch Top 40)	1
Netherlands (Single Top 100)	1
New Zealand (Recorded Music NZ)	2
Norway (VG-lista)	3
Portugal Digital Songs (Billboard)	1
Romania (Airplay 100)	1
Russia Airplay (TopHit)	76
Scottish Singles Sales (Official Charts)	3
Slovakia Airplay (ČNS IFPI)	1
Slovakia Singles Digital (ČNS IFPI)	2
Slovenia (SloTop50)	1
South Africa Airplay (EMA)	2
Spain (Promusicae)	2
Sweden (Sverigetopplistan)	1
Switzerland (Schweizer Hitparade)	1
UK Singles (Official Charts)	2
UK Hip Hop/R&B (Official Charts)	1
US Billboard Hot 100	1
US Hot R&B/Hip-Hop Songs (Billboard)	1
US Adult Contemporary (Billboard)	1
US Adult R&B Songs (Billboard)	1
US Adult Pop Airplay (Billboard)	1
US Dance Club Songs (Billboard)	32
US Pop Airplay (Billboard)	1
US Rhythmic Airplay (Billboard)	1
US Smooth Jazz Airplay (Billboard)	11

Chart (2021)	Peak position
Global 200 (Billboard)	91

=== Year-end charts ===
Chart (2013)	Position
Australia (ARIA)	49
Belgium Urban (Ultratop)	28
Netherlands (Dutch Top 40)	58
Netherlands (Mega Single Top 100)	32

Chart (2014)	Position
Australia (ARIA)	11
Austria (IFPI)	10
Belgium Urban (Ultratop)	2
Belgium (Ultratop Flanders)	7
Belgium (Ultratop Wallonia)	19
Canada (Canadian Hot 100)	2
Denmark (Tracklisten)	1
France (SNEP)	12
Germany (Official German Charts)	16
Hungary (Single Top 40)	32
Ireland (IRMA)	2
Israel (Media Forest)	5
Italy (FIMI)	11
Netherlands (Dutch Top 40)	7
Netherlands (Single Top 100)	1
New Zealand (Recorded Music NZ)	3
Romania (Airplay 100)	32
Russia Airplay (TopHit)	150
Slovenia (SloTop50)	14
Spain (PROMUSICAE)	5
Sweden (Sverigetopplistan)	1
Switzerland (Schweizer Hitparade)	6
UK Singles (Official Charts Company)	3
US Billboard Hot 100	3
US Adult Contemporary (Billboard)	1
US Adult Top 40 (Billboard)	4
US Mainstream Top 40 (Billboard)	3
US Hot R&B/Hip-Hop Songs (Billboard)	2
US Hot R&B/Hip-Hop Airplay (Billboard)	5
US Rhythmic (Billboard)	14

Chart (2015)	Position
Canada (Canadian Hot 100)	74
France (SNEP)	78
Germany (Official German Charts)	64
Hungary (Single Top 40)	29
Italy (FIMI)	36
Netherlands (Single Top 100)	63
Slovenia (SloTop50)	35
Spain (PROMUSICAE)	62
Sweden (Sverigetopplistan)	57
Switzerland (Schweizer Hitparade)	34
UK Singles (Official Charts Company)	81
US Adult Contemporary (Billboard)	33

Chart (2016)	Position
Hungary (Single Top 40)	79

Chart (2017)	Position
Hungary (Single Top 40)	84

Chart (2021)	Position
Global 200 (Billboard)	91
Portugal (AFP)	199

=== Decade-end charts ===
Chart (2010–2019)	Position
Australia (ARIA)	21
Germany (Official German Charts)	24
Israel (Galgalatz)	13
Netherlands (Single Top 100)	2
UK Singles (Official Charts Company)	8
US Billboard Hot 100	32
US Hot R&B/Hip-Hop Songs (Billboard)	22

=== All-time charts ===
All-time chart rankings for "All of Me"
Chart	Position
Dutch Love Songs (Dutch Top 40)	3
UK Singles (OCC)	74

Chart (1958–2018)	Position
US Billboard Hot 100	138

== Certifications ==
Region	Certification	Certified units/sales
Australia (ARIA)	17× Platinum	1,190,000^{‡}
Austria (IFPI Austria)	Gold	15,000^{*}
Belgium (BRMA)	Platinum	30,000^{*}
Canada (Music Canada)	5× Platinum	400,000^{*}
Denmark (IFPI Danmark)	6× Platinum	540,000^{‡}
France (SNEP)	Gold	75,000^{*}
Germany (BVMI)	3× Platinum	1,800,000^{‡}
Italy (FIMI)	8× Platinum	400,000^{‡}
Mexico (AMPROFON)	2× Diamond+3× Platinum	780,000^{‡}
Netherlands (NVPI)	Platinum	20,000^{^}
New Zealand (RMNZ)	8× Platinum	240,000^{‡}
Norway (IFPI Norway)	Platinum	10,000^{‡}
Portugal (AFP)	4× Platinum	80,000^{‡}
Spain (Promusicae)	6× Platinum	360,000^{‡}
Sweden (GLF)	11× Platinum	440,000^{‡}
Switzerland (IFPI Switzerland)	2× Platinum	60,000^{^}
United Kingdom (BPI)	7× Platinum	4,200,000^{‡}
United States (RIAA)	14× Platinum	14,000,000^{‡}
Streaming
Denmark (IFPI Danmark)	4× Platinum	10,400,000^{†}
Spain (Promusicae)	2× Platinum	16,000,000^{†}
^{*} Sales figures based on certification alone.^{^} Shipments figures based on certification alone.^{‡} Sales+streaming figures based on certification alone.^{†} Streaming-only figures based on certification alone.

== Release history ==
Region	Date	Format	Label
United States	August 12, 2013	Mainstream urban radio	GOOD; Columbia
United States	September 30, 2013	Smooth jazz radio	Columbia
Italy	November 22, 2013	Contemporary hit radio	Sony
United Kingdom	November 30, 2013	Contemporary hit radio	Columbia
United States	February 2014	Contemporary hit radio	Columbia

== See also ==
- List of Airplay 100 number ones of the 2010s
- List of best-selling singles in Australia
- List of Billboard Adult Contemporary number ones of 2014
