= BET Presents: Love and Happiness: An Obama Celebration =

- Created by: BET
- Starring: Various
- Country of origin: United States

Production
- Executive producer: Deborah Lee
- Running time: 90 minutes

Original release
- Network: Syndicated
- Release: November 15, 2016

BET Presents: Love And Happiness: An Obama Celebration was held at the White House on the South Lawn on October 26, 2016. It aired November 15, 2016 on BET and Centric. The celebration served as a "love letter to President Obama and First Lady, Michelle Obama." The event was hosted by Terrence J and Regina Hall. Featuring musical guest, Jill Scott, Common, Usher, Bell Biv DeVoe, The Roots, Janelle Monaé, De La Soul, Yolanda Adams, Michelle Williams, Kierra Sheard and Leslie Odom Jr.

== Hosts ==
- Terrence J
- Regina Hall

== The Final Goodbye ==
During the final concert of the evening, Barack Obama wanted to thank BET for agreeing the film, his block party.

== Speakers ==
- Jessie Williams
- Samuel L. Jackson
- Bradley Cooper
- Angela Bassett

== Set lists ==
Performer(s)	Song
Jill Scott	Run Run Run
Jill Scott	Golden
Common	Obama Freestyle (The People Remix)
Common	The Light
Common	Glory (featuring Yolanda Adams)
Janelle Monáe	Smile
Janelle Monáe	Tightrope
Leslie Odom Jr.	Barack Obama : The Musical
Leslie Odom Jr.	Forever Young
Bell Biv Devoe	Poison
Yolanda Adams, Michelle Williams, Kierra Sheard	Jesus Can Work it Out (featuring The Reginald Golden Singers)
The Roots	The Next Movement
The Roots	White House Boogie (Jungle Boogie Remix)
De La Soul	Buddy (Intro) (featuring The Roots)
De La Soul	The Bizness (featuring Common & The Roots)
De La Soul	Me Myself and I (featuring The Roots)
The Roots	You Got Me (featuring Jill Scott & Usher)
Usher	You Make Me Wanna (featuring The Roots)
Usher	Caught Up (featuring The Roots)
Usher	Rock Creek Park (featuring The Roots)
Usher	Yeah ! (featuring The Roots)
The Roots	Love & Happiness (Outro)
