= You & I (Nobody in the World) =

Single by John Legend

from the album Love in the Future
- Released: April 29, 2014
- Recorded: 2013
- Genre: R&B
- Length: 4:12 (album version); 3:14 (radio edit)
- Label: GOOD; Columbia
- Songwriters: John Stephens; James Ryan Ho; Dave Tozer; Dan Wilson; Jamie Gaynor
- Producers: Malay; Dave Tozer; John Legend; Ron Thaler

John Legend singles chronology
"All of Me" (2013)	"You & I (Nobody in the World)" (2014)	"Don't Say Goodbye" (2014)

"You & I (Nobody in the World)" is a song by American singer John Legend. Legend co-wrote the song with James Ryan Ho, Dave Tozer and Dan Wilson, with production by Malay, Tozer and Legend. It impacted urban adult contemporary radio in the United States on April 29, 2014, as the fourth single from his fourth studio album Love in the Future (2013).

== Music video ==
The music video for "You & I (Nobody in the World)" was released on July 10, 2014. In the video, Legend "showcases his appreciation for the true beauty of all women" and sings about his love for his wife Chrissy Teigen. The video includes appearances by actress Laverne Cox, Tig Notaro and Tatyana Ali.

== Track listing ==
- Digital download — remix
1. "You & I (Nobody in the World)" (R3hab Remix) (Radio Edit) – 3:14

== Charts ==
=== Weekly charts ===
Chart (2014)	Peak position
Belgium Urban (Ultratop Flanders)	39
US Billboard Hot 100	66
US Hot R&B/Hip-Hop Songs (Billboard)	18
US Rhythmic Airplay (Billboard)	34

=== Year-end charts ===
Chart (2014)	Position
US Hot R&B/Hip-Hop Songs (Billboard)	78

== Certifications ==
Region	Certification	Certified units/sales
Australia (ARIA)	Gold	35,000^{‡}
Denmark (IFPI Danmark)	Gold	45,000^{‡}
New Zealand (RMNZ)	Gold	15,000^{‡}
United States (RIAA)	Platinum	1,000,000^{‡}
^{‡} Sales+streaming figures based on certification alone.

== Release history ==
Region	Date	Format	Label
United States	April 29, 2014	Urban adult contemporary radio	GOOD; Columbia
United States	August 30, 2014	Digital download — remix	GOOD; Columbia
United Kingdom	September 2, 2014	Digital download — remix	GOOD; Columbia
United Kingdom	October 11, 2014	Contemporary hit radio	GOOD; Columbia
