= Love in the Future =

Studio album by John Legend
- Released: August 30, 2013
- Recorded: 2011–2013
- Genres: R&B; soul
- Length: 49:04
- Labels: GOOD; Columbia
- Producers: Dave Tozer (also exec.); Kanye West (also exec.); 88-Keys; Ali Shaheed Muhammad; Bink!; Boogz; David L. Anderson II; Da Internz; Darhyl Camper; Doc McKinney; Hit-Boy; Jeff Bhasker; John Legend; Jon David Anderson; Ken Lewis; Malay; Mark Williams; Nana Kwabena; Pharrell Williams; Q-Tip; The Runners; Travi$ Scott; The Twilite Tone; Andrew Horowitz

John Legend chronology
Wake Up! (2010)	Love in the Future (2013)	Darkness and Light (2016)

Singles from Love in the Future
- 1. "Who Do We Think We Are" Released: March 25, 2013; 2. "Made to Love" Released: June 18, 2013; 3. "All of Me" Released: August 12, 2013; 4. "You & I (Nobody in the World)" Released: April 29, 2014

Love in the Future is the fifth studio album by American singer John Legend. The album was released on August 30, 2013, by GOOD Music and Columbia Records. The album, executive produced by Legend, Kanye West and Dave Tozer, features guest appearances from Kimbra, Rick Ross, Stacy Barthe and Seal. The album was supported by four singles, "Who Do We Think We Are", "Made to Love", "All of Me" and "You & I (Nobody in the World)". Love in the Future received generally positive reviews from music critics. The album debuted at number 4 on the US Billboard 200 chart, selling 68,000 copies in its first week.

== Background ==
In August 2013, during an interview with XXL, John Legend spoke about how long it took him to finish the album, saying:

"Well I did the Wake Up! album with The Roots in 2010, so it’s really only been three years in my mind, because I put as much energy and time into that as I would my own album. Then I did some shows with them and I toured with Sade, so I spent a decent amount of time on the road, and then I spent the past couple of years on the album. It took a little longer on this album than on previous albums, but I’m really just a year off my pace."

He also spoke about working with Kanye West on the album, saying: "I worked with Kanye more on this album than I had before, and I think part of it is just us connecting and getting together to create, given how busy he is and how busy I am. Just finding time for us to work together kind of added a little bit of extra time to the process. But I think it was worth it." He also spoke about how he feels this is his best album yet, saying: "I feel like it’s my best album yet, and I think creatively, we did some great things. The collaboration and the talent that we have on the album is better than we’ve ever had. As far as producers, co-writers and people just helping shape the sound. I feel like Kanye’s leadership was great in helping to do that. I really feel good about it."

== Singles ==
The album's lead single "Who Do We Think We Are" featuring Rick Ross was released on March 25, 2013. On May 6, 2013, the music video was released for the single. The album's second single "Made to Love" was released on June 18, 2013, and the music video was released on August 1, 2013.

"All of Me" impacted American mainstream urban radio as the album's third single on August 12, 2013. On October 2, 2013, its music video was released. "All of Me" has since peaked at number one on the US Billboard Hot 100, becoming the highest-charting song from the album and John Legend's first number-one single of his career. "You & I (Nobody in the World)" was serviced to urban adult contemporary radio in the United States on April 29, 2014, as the fourth single.

== Critical response ==
Professional ratings
Aggregate scores
Source	Rating
Metacritic	72/100
Review scores
Source	Rating
AllMusic	4/5 stars
Exclaim!	5/10
Now	3/5 stars
The Observer	3/5 stars
PopMatters	8/10
Rolling Stone	3.5/5 stars
Slant	3/5 stars
USA Today	3.5/4 stars

Love in the Future was met with generally positive reviews from music critics. At Metacritic, which assigns a normalized rating out of 100 to reviews from critics, the album received an average score of 72, which indicates "generally favorable reviews", based on 10 reviews. Andy Kellman of AllMusic gave the album four out of five stars, saying "This is a heavy, laboriously made set of songs. The list of producers alone includes Hit-Boy, Bink, 88 Keys, the Runners, Doc McKinney, Q-Tip, and Ali Shaheed Muhammad. Kanye West, and Dave Tozer pile on as co-producers and co-executive producers. Perhaps they ensured that the whole album would have its dramatic, slightly eerie tone; even the covers of Bobby Caldwell's "Open Your Eyes" and Anita Baker's "Angel" are a little uneasy. That level of sonic indulgence seems like it should be incompatible with an artist who is, essentially, a piano man, but Love in the Future is among Legend's best work, made for couples who are into one another for the long term while feeling a little daring and crazy. " Molloy Woodcraft of The Observer gave the album three out of five stars, saying "John Legend's fifth studio album is a far cry from his last, 2010's consciousness-raising, full-tilt collaboration with the Roots, Wake Up! The sound is positively pared in comparison, produced and programmed by the likes of Kanye West and Dave Tozer. Legend's voice is excellent throughout and comes to the fore on ballads such as All of Me." Sal Cinquemani of Slant Magazine gave the album three out of five stars, saying "At 16 tracks, the album moves surprisingly fast, with few songs outstaying their welcome, but it ultimately fails to successfully push Legend into the future." Logan Smithson of PopMatters gave the album an eight out of ten, saying "Whether you’ve fallen victim to cuffing season or you’re simply looking for some good music, Love in the Future can be your album. One could even make a very strong case for Love in the Future being Legend’s best album to date."

At USA Today, Jerry Shriver gave the album three-and-a-half stars out of four, writing that Legend "has crafted a deeply romantic and soulful dowry". Jon Dolan of Rolling Stone gave the album three and a half stars out of five, saying "On Legend's fourth LP, executive producer Kanye West helps give him a plush, nuanced palette to match his signature emotional generosity and strong sensuality – from mountainous piano crushers like "All of Me" to "The Beginning," which flips a freaking Sara Bareilles sample into a promise of endless babymaking rapture. And you know he's gonna cook the fuck out of some breakfast in the morning." Ryan B. Patrick of Exclaim! gave the album a five out of ten, saying "Love in the Future? Speaking of which, any forthcoming John Legend documentary should be titled The Curious Case of John Stephens. For a musical prodigy that first burst out of the gate with a lively debut album (2004's Get Lifted), Legend has settled into a languid musical stride, one akin to a Las Vegas lounge singer." Ken Capobianco of The Boston Globe gave the album a positive review, saying "Don’t be fooled by the title of John Legend’s fourth solo record, as the music actually looks backward to sweeping romanticism and pop formalism. All of Legend’s strengths are present: keen melodies, smooth vocal understatement, and artful arrangements. Essentially, the disc plays like a love letter to his fiancee, supermodel Chrissy Teigen, yet it resonates." Julia LeConte of Now gave the album three out of five stars, saying "Overall, this sounds like classic John Legend. There is something wonderful about a timeless performer not bending to current musical fads. If it ain’t broke…."

== Commercial performance ==
Love in the Future debuted at number four on the Billboard 200 chart, with first-week sales of 68,000 copies in the United States. In its second week the album sold 30,000 more copies. On May 14, 2014, the album was certified Gold by the RIAA for selling over 500,000 copies in the United States. It has sold 789,000 copies in the United States as of November 2016.

In the United Kingdom, the album debuted at number 28, making it Legend's lowest-charting studio album at the time, and initially spent only one week in the top 40, dropping thirty-six places to number 64 in its second week. However, the success of "All of Me" caused it to re-enter the top 40 at number 36 in the chart dated February 16, 2014. Love in the Future has so far spent twenty-six weeks in the top 40 (twenty-five of which came after the release of "All of Me") and has reached a new peak of number two, making it his highest-charting album to date and only his second album to reach the UK top ten.

== Accolades ==
In December 2013, Love in the Future was nominated for Best R&B Album at the 2014 Grammy Awards.

== Track listing ==
No.	Title	Writer(s)	Producer(s)	Length
1.	"Love in the Future (Intro)"	John Stephens; Martin McKinney; Ali Shaheed Muhammad; Dave Tozer	Tozer	0:41
2.	"The Beginning..."	Stephens; James Fauntleroy II; Chauncey Hollis; Kanye West; Sara Bareilles; Ingrid Michaelson	Hit-Boy; West^{[a]}; Tozer^{[b]}	3:25
3.	"Open Your Eyes"	Bobby Caldwell; Norman Harris; Bruce Malament	Darhyl "Hey DJ" Camper; West; Tozer^{[b]}; Boogz^{[b]}	3:06
4.	"Made to Love"	Stephens; Tozer; Kimbra Lee Johnson; Nana Kwabena Tuffuor; Justin Baron; Andrew Horowitz; West; Marcos Palacios; Ernest Clark; Lil' Louis; Marshall Jefferson	Tozer; Kwabena; West^{[a]}; Da Internz^{[a]}	4:00
5.	"Who Do We Think We Are" (featuring Rick Ross)	Stephens; West; Guordan Banks; William Roberts II; Roosevelt Harrell III; Tozer; Anthony Khan; Marvin Gaye; Ed Townsend; Carol Washington; Ralph Williams; Joseph Broussard	Bink!; Tozer^{[a]}; West^{[a]}; The Twilite Tone^{[b]}; Kwabena^{[b]}	4:52
6.	"All of Me"	Stephens; Toby Gad	Tozer; John Legend	4:29
7.	"Hold on Longer"	Stephens; Fauntleroy II; Charles Njapa; West; Tozer; Allan Rich	88-Keys; Tozer^{[a]}; West^{[a]}	2:38
8.	"Save the Night"	Stephens; Tozer; Kevin Cossom; Jermaine Jackson; Andrew Harr; Jon David Anderson; David L. Anderson II; West	The Runners; J.D. Anderson; D.L. Anderson II; Tozer; West^{[a]}; Legend^{[a]}; Mark Williams^{[b]}	3:09
9.	"Tomorrow"	Stephens; Kamaal Fareed; Malcolm Rebennack, Jr.	Q-Tip	3:32
10.	"What If I Told You? (Interlude)"	Stephens; Fauntleroy II; Khan; West; Tozer	The Twilite Tone; West; Tozer; Ken Lewis^{[b]}	0:50
11.	"Dreams"	Stephens; Jessyca Wilson; Joe Jonas; Camper, Jr.; West	Hey DJ Camper; Legend; West; Tozer^{[b]}	2:38
12.	"Wanna Be Loved"	Stephens; McKinney; Muhammad	Doc McKinney; Muhammad	3:06
13.	"Angel (Interlude)" (featuring Stacy Barthe)	Patrick Moten; Sandra Sully	Hey DJ Camper; West	1:24
14.	"You & I (Nobody in the World)"	Stephens; Dan Wilson; James Ryan Ho; Tozer	Malay; Tozer; Legend	4:12
15.	"Asylum"	Stephens; Tozer; M. Williams; West	Tozer; West^{[a]}; M. Williams^{[b]}	3:17
16.	"Caught Up"	Stephens; West; Banks; Hollis; Tozer	Hit-Boy; Tozer^{[a]}; West^{[a]}	3:45
Total length:				49:04

Deluxe edition bonus tracks
No.	Title	Writer(s)	Producer(s)	Length
17.	"So Gone"	Stephens; Harrell III; Robert E. Miller	Bink!	4:46
18.	"We Loved It" (featuring Seal)	Stephens; West; Seal Henry Samuel; Jeff Bhasker; Jacques Webster II; Tozer	West; Bhasker; Tozer^{[a]}; Travi$ Scott^{[b]}	4:02
19.	"Aim High"	Pharrell Williams	P. Williams; Legend^{[a]}	4:18
20.	"For the First Time"	Stephens; Billy Mann; David Schuler	Legend; Tozer^{[b]}	5:12
Total length:				67:22

Asian tour edition bonus tracks
No.	Title	Length
17.	"All of Me" (Tiësto's Birthday Treatment Remix – Radio Edit)	4:11
18.	"All of Me" (featuring Jennifer Nettles and Hunter Hayes)	4:19

Special edition bonus tracks
No.	Title	Length
17.	"Dancing In the Dark" (Live)	4:53
18.	"Bridge Over Troubled Water" (Live)	5:02
19.	"Ordinary People" (Live)	5:35
20.	"All of Me" (Live)	5:00
21.	"All of Me" (Tiësto's Birthday Treatment Remix – Radio Edit)	4:11
Total length:		73:45

Notes

- Track listing and credits from album booklet.
- ^{^a} signifies a co-producer.
- ^{^b} signifies an additional producer.
- "Made to Love" features vocals by Kimbra and Aude Cardona.
- "Save the Night" and "Aim High" feature background vocals by Jessyca Wilson.
- "Tomorrow" features background vocals by Ashley Rodriguez.
- "What If I Told You? (Interlude)" features background vocals by James Fauntleroy.
- "Asylum" features vocals by Jessyca Wilson.
- "Caught Up" features vocals by Aude Cardona and background vocals by Jessyca Wilson and Guordan Banks.

Sample credits

- "The Beginning..." contains a sample from "Winter Song", written and performed by Sara Bareilles and Ingrid Michaelson.
- "Open Your Eyes" is a cover to the track of the same name, written by Bobby Caldwell, Norman Harris, and Bruce Malament, and it contains a sample from "You're Gettin' a Little Too Smart", written by Abrim Tilmon, and performed by The Detroit Emeralds.
- "Who Do We Think We Are" contains an excerpt from the live version of "Let Love Rule", written and performed by Lenny Kravitz; samples from "Mr. Big Stuff", written by Joseph Broussard, Carol Washington, and Ralph Williams, and performed by Jean Knight; and samples from "If I Should Die Tonight", written by Marvin Gaye and Ed Townsend, and performed by Gaye.
- "Tomorrow" contains a sample from "Glowin'", written by Malcolm Rebennack Jr., and performed by Dr. John.
- "So Gone" contains a sample from "Always Together", written by Marcus Miller, Al Smith, Genevieve Smith, and Robin Smith, and performed by The Dells.

== Charts ==
=== Weekly charts ===
Chart (2013–2014)	Peak position
Australian Albums (ARIA)	15
Austrian Albums (Ö3 Austria)	64
Belgian Albums (Ultratop Flanders)	25
Belgian Albums (Ultratop Wallonia)	48
Canadian Albums (Billboard)	10
Danish Albums (Hitlisten)	12
Dutch Albums (Album Top 100)	3
French Albums (SNEP)	67
German Albums (Offizielle Top 100)	47
Irish Albums (IRMA)	10
Italian Albums (FIMI)	13
New Zealand Albums (RMNZ)	10
Norwegian Albums (VG-lista)	20
Portuguese Albums (AFP)	12
Scottish Albums (Official Charts)	3
South African Albums (RISA)	5
Spanish Albums (Promusicae)	41
Swedish Albums (Sverigetopplistan)	27
Swiss Albums (Schweizer Hitparade)	16
UK Albums (Official Charts)	2
UK R&B Albums (Official Charts)	1
US Billboard 200	4
US Top R&B/Hip-Hop Albums (Billboard)	2

=== Year-end charts ===
Chart (2013)	Position
Australian Albums (ARIA)	97
Dutch Albums (Album Top 100)	67
US Billboard 200	130
US Top R&B/Hip-Hop Albums (Billboard)	29
US Top R&B Albums (Billboard)	9

Chart (2014)	Position
Australian Albums (ARIA)	63
Belgian Albums (Ultratop Flanders)	84
Dutch Albums (Album Top 100)	31
Swedish Albums (Sverigetopplistan)	75
UK Albums (OCC)	16
US Billboard 200	33
US Top R&B/Hip-Hop Albums (Billboard)	6
US Top R&B Albums (Billboard)	4

Chart (2015)	Position
Danish Albums (Hitlisten)	92
US Billboard 200	161
US Top R&B/Hip-Hop Albums (Billboard)	63

=== Decade-end charts ===
Chart (2010–2019)	Position
US Billboard 200	162

== Certifications ==
Region	Certification	Certified units/sales
Australia (ARIA)	Platinum	70,000^{‡}
Brazil (Pro-Música Brasil)	Platinum	40,000^{‡}
Canada (Music Canada)	Gold	40,000^{^}
Denmark (IFPI Danmark)	Platinum	20,000^{‡}
Mexico (AMPROFON)	Platinum+Gold	90,000^{‡}
New Zealand (RMNZ)	2× Platinum	30,000^{‡}
Poland (ZPAV)	Platinum	20,000^{‡}
Sweden (GLF)	Gold	20,000^{‡}
United Kingdom (BPI)	Platinum	300,000^{*}
United States (RIAA)	2× Platinum	789,000
^{^} Shipments figures based on certification alone.^{‡} Sales+streaming figures based on certification alone.

== Release history ==
Region	Date	Format	Label
Ireland	August 30, 2013	Digital download	GOOD; Columbia
United Kingdom	August 30, 2013	Digital download	GOOD; Columbia
United States	August 30, 2013	Digital download	GOOD; Columbia
United Kingdom	September 2, 2013	CD	GOOD; Columbia
United States	September 3, 2013	CD	GOOD; Columbia
Japan	September 10, 2013	CD	Sony Japan
