= Don't Say Goodbye (Sérgio Mendes song) =

"Don't Say Goodbyee"

Single by Sérgio Mendes featuring John Legend

from the album Magic
- Released: August 29, 2014
- Recorded: 2014
- Genre: Jazz; Samba; Bossa nova
- Length: 3:45
- Label: Sony Music; OKeh
- Songwriters: Sérgio Mendes; John Roger Stephens; Scott Mayo
- Producer: Sérgio Mendes

Sérgio Mendes singles chronology
"Funky Bahia" (2008)	"Don't Say Goodbyee" (2014)

John Legend singles chronology
""You & I (Nobody in the World)"" (2014)	""Don't Say Goodbye"" (2014)	""Glory"" (2014)

"Don't Say Goodbye" is a song by Brazilian musician Sérgio Mendes, featuring vocals from American singer John Legend. was released on August 29, 2014, as the lead single of his nineteen studio album Magic, with the record label OKeh Records. The song was produced by Mendes.

== Track listing ==
- Download digital
1. Don't Say Goodbye (featuring John Legend) — 3:43

== Release history ==
Country	Date	Format
United States	August 29, 2014	Digital download
