= Kabhi Alvida Naa Kehna (soundtrack album) =

Soundtrack album by Shankar–Ehsaan–Loy
- Released: 16 June 2006
- Recorded: 2005–2006
- Genre: Feature film soundtrack
- Length: 42:07
- Language: Hindi; English
- Label: Sony BMG
- Producer: Shankar–Ehsaan–Loy

Shankar–Ehsaan–Loy chronology
Dil Jo Bhi Kahey... (2005)	Kabhi Alvida Naa Kehna (2006)	Don – The Chase Begins Again (2006)

Kabhi Alvida Naa Kehna is the soundtrack album to the 2006 Hindi-language film of the same name, directed by Karan Johar and produced by Dharma Productions. The film stars Amitabh Bachchan, Shah Rukh Khan, Abhishek Bachchan, Rani Mukherji, Preity Zinta, and Kirron Kher. The soundtrack was composed by Shankar–Ehsaan–Loy, with lyrics by Javed Akhtar.

The album was first launched in the United Kingdom on 12 June 2006, followed by its official release in India by Sony BMG on 16 June 2006. It received widespread acclaim and audiences and became the second highest-selling Bollywood soundtrack of the year. The album garnered multiple nominations and awards and is regarded as one of the notable Hindi film soundtracks of all time.

== Background ==
The original score and soundtrack for Kabhi Alvida Naa Kehna were composed by the trio Shankar–Ehsaan–Loy, who had previously collaborated with Karan Johar on Kal Ho Naa Ho (2003), a production by Dharma Productions. Their involvement marked a departure from Johar’s earlier directorial ventures, which had featured music by Jatin–Lalit. The soundtrack was composed in Goa and recorded at the trio’s studio in Mumbai.

Sonu Nigam playbacked for Shahrukh Khan, and Shaan playbacked for Abhishek Bachchan. Vasundhara Das and Mahalakshmi Iyer sang for Preity Zinta, and Alka Yagnik sang for Rani Mukherjee. The title track, rendered by Sonu Nigam and Alka Yagnik, is an emotional ballad that also features a sad version. The composers additionally created a trance remix of the title song, an unconventional choice for Hindi film music at the time. For the romantic number "Tumhi Dekho Naa," Nigam and Yagnik returned as vocalists, and the opening tune was adapted from an earlier melody composed by the trio.

"Mitwa" is a Sufi rock ballad that marked the Bollywood debut of Pakistani singer Shafqat Amanat Ali. The composers were seeking a distinctive voice for the track, and Shankar Mahadevan, having heard Ali’s "Ankhon Ke Sagar" on the radio, initiated contact through a broadcaster acquaintance before inviting him to record the song. A remixed version titled "Mitwa – Revisited" was also included in the album.

The soundtrack also features two club-oriented tracks: "Where’s the Party Tonight?", performed by Shaan, Vasundhara Das, Loy Mendonsa, and Mahadevan; and "Rock 'N' Roll Soniye," styled as a 1960s rock and roll number, sung by Mahadevan, Shaan, and Mahalakshmi Iyer. While the album shares stylistic elements with Kal Ho Naa Ho, the composers sought to differentiate it in tone and structure to avoid repetition.

== Release ==
In March 2006, it was reported that Sony BMG had acquired the audio rights to the Kabhi Alvida Naa Kehna soundtrack for ₹8 crore (approximately US$930,000), making it one of the highest-valued music deals for a Bollywood film at the time. The album was first launched in the United Kingdom on 12 June 2006 as part of the film’s international promotional strategy. The event was attended by director Karan Johar, actor Shah Rukh Khan, and Gauri Khan.

The official Indian release took place on 16 June 2006 and coincided with a promotional event held during the 7th IIFA Awards in Dubai.

== Reception ==
=== Critical reception ===
The Kabhi Alvida Naa Kehna soundtrack received widespread acclaim from critics and listeners upon release.

Joginder Tuteja of Bollywood Hungama dismissed the initial skepticism around the album and described it as "yet another fine product from the team that delivers the kind of path-breaking music expected from it." He praised Shankar–Ehsaan–Loy for continuing their successful collaboration with Karan Johar, delivering music that aligned with the film's emotional tone. Sukanya Verma of Rediff.com called the album "a treat for the melody-starved," highlighting its lyrical richness and melodious compositions. She singled out "Mitwa" for its fusion of Sufi and contemporary sounds, describing it as "uplifting and lively." S. Sahaya Ranjit of India Today referred to the soundtrack as "a good mix" and appreciated its diversity, calling the title track "soothing" and "Rock 'n' Roll Soniye" a potential hit. Karthik Srinivasan of Milliblog offered a more nuanced view, stating that while the soundtrack leaned heavily on the successful template of Kal Ho Naa Ho (2003), it still featured several strong tracks.

Ranjani Saigal of Lokvani commended the emotional depth of the title track, performed by Sonu Nigam and Alka Yagnik, and praised "Mitwa" for its blending of Pakistani and Indian classical singing with Western elements. She also highlighted the appeal of "Tumhi Dekho Naa" for its soothing melody and romantic lylyrics d noted "Rock N Roll Soniye" as an energetic number with old-school charm. John Li of MovieXclusive appreciated the soundtrack’s cross-cultural appeal, observing that its themes resonated with traditional Indian values while incorporating modern influences. He described "Mitwa" as an uplifting soft-rock ballad and the title song as a melancholic piano-based piece that underscores the emotional core of the film. He also found the party tracks, particularly "Where's The Party Tonight" and "Rock N Roll Soniye," to be "guilty pleasures" likely to resonate at social gatherings. A user review on MouthShut.com echoed critical sentiment, describing the album as "a breath of fresh air" in an otherwise repetitive music landscape. The reviewer called "Mitwa" the standout track, praised its unique rhythm, and highlighted the instrumental segment in "Tumhi Dekho Naa" as a distinctive touch.

=== Commercial performance ===
The Kabhi Alvida Naa Kehna soundtrack debuted at number one on the Indian music charts and remained in the top position for ten consecutive weeks. Its performance was notable given the competition from other successful soundtracks released in the same period, including Gangster: A Love Story, Fanaa and Krrish. According to Box Office India, the album sold over 1.9 million units in India, making it the second highest-selling Bollywood soundtrack of 2006, behind Dhoom 2.

In subsequent years, the album has been recognized in several retrospective lists highlighting notable Hindi film soundtracks. It is often cited as one of the most popular and influential Bollywood albums of all time, with particular praise directed toward the track "Mitwa," which gained widespread popularity.

== Track listing ==
No.	Title	Singer(s)	Length
1.	"Kabhi Alvida Naa Kehna"	Sonu Nigam, Alka Yagnik	08:07
2.	"Mitwa"	Shafqat Amanat Ali, Shankar Mahadevan, Caralisa Monteiro	06:24
3.	"Where's The Party Tonight?"	Vasundhara Das, Shaan, Joi Barua, Carnatic Vocals by Shankar Mahadevan	06:21
4.	"Mitwa" (Revisited)	Shafqat Amanat Ali, Shankar Mahadevan, Caralisa Monteiro	05:35
5.	"Tumhi Dekho Naa"	Sonu Nigam, Alka Yagnik	05:50
6.	"Rock 'N' Roll Soniye"	Mahalakshmi Iyer, Shankar Mahadevan, Shaan	05:44
7.	"Farewell Trance"	Caralisa Monteiro, Shweta Pandit	05:47
8.	"Kabhi Alvida Naa Kehna" (Sad Version)	Sonu Nigam, Alka Yagnik	02:06
Total length:			42:07

== Awards and nominations ==
Award (Note: Awards, festivals and organizations are in alphabetical order.)	Date of ceremony (Note: Date is linked to the article about the awards held that year, wherever possible.)	Category	Recipient(s)	Result	Ref.
Bollywood Movie Awards	26 May 2007	Best Music Director	Shankar–Ehsaan–Loy	Won	
Bollywood Movie Awards	26 May 2007	Best Male Playback Singer	Sonu Nigam for "Kabhi Alvida Naa Kehna"	Nominated	
Bollywood Movie Awards	26 May 2007	Best Female Playback Singer	Alka Yagnik for "Kabhi Alvida Naa Kehna"	Won	
Filmfare Awards	17 February 2007	Best Music Director	Shankar–Ehsaan–Loy	Nominated	
Filmfare Awards	17 February 2007	Best Background Score	Shankar–Ehsaan–Loy	Nominated	
Filmfare Awards	17 February 2007	Best Lyricist	Javed Akhtar for "Kabhi Alvida Naa Kehna"	Nominated	
Filmfare Awards	17 February 2007	Best Lyricist	Javed Akhtar for "Mitwa"	Nominated	
Filmfare Awards	17 February 2007	Best Male Playback Singer	Sonu Nigam for "Kabhi Alvida Naa Kehna"	Nominated	
Filmfare Awards	17 February 2007	Best Female Playback Singer	Alka Yagnik for "Kabhi Alvida Naa Kehna"	Nominated	
Global Indian Film Awards	7–9 December 2006	Best Music Director	Shankar–Ehsaan–Loy	Nominated	
Global Indian Film Awards	7–9 December 2006	Best Lyricist	Javed Akhtar for "Kabhi Alvida Naa Kehna"	Nominated	
Global Indian Film Awards	7–9 December 2006	Best Male Playback Singer	Shafqat Amanat Ali for Mitwa"	Nominated	
Global Indian Film Awards	7–9 December 2006	Best Male Playback Singer	Sonu Nigam for "Kabhi Alvida Naa Kehna"	Nominated	
Global Indian Film Awards	7–9 December 2006	Best Female Playback Singer	Alka Yagnik for "Kabhi Alvida Naa Kehna"	Won	
International Indian Film Academy Awards	7–9 June 2007	Best Music Director	Shankar–Ehsaan–Loy	Nominated	
International Indian Film Academy Awards	7–9 June 2007	Best Lyricist	Javed Akhtar for "Kabhi Alvida Naa Kehna"	Nominated	
International Indian Film Academy Awards	7–9 June 2007	Best Male Playback Singer	Sonu Nigam for "Kabhi Alvida Naa Kehna"	Nominated	
International Indian Film Academy Awards	7–9 June 2007	Best Female Playback Singer	Alka Yagnik for "Kabhi Alvida Naa Kehna"	Nominated	
Screen Awards	6 January 2007	Best Music Director	Shankar–Ehsaan–Loy	Nominated	
Screen Awards	6 January 2007	Best Lyricist	Javed Akhtar for "Mitwa"	Nominated	
Screen Awards	6 January 2007	Best Male Playback Singer	Shafqat Amanat Ali for "Mitwa"	Nominated	
Screen Awards	6 January 2007	Best Female Playback Singer	Alka Yagnik for "Tumhi Dekho Naa"	Nominated	
Zee Cine Awards	1 April 2007	Best Music Director	Shankar–Ehsaan–Loy	Nominated	
Zee Cine Awards	1 April 2007	Best Background Score	Shankar–Ehsaan–Loy	Nominated	
Zee Cine Awards	1 April 2007	Best Lyricist	Javed Akhtar for "Mitwa"	Nominated	
Zee Cine Awards	1 April 2007	Best Male Playback Singer	Shafqat Amanat Ali for "Mitwa"	Nominated	
Zee Cine Awards	1 April 2007	Best Male Playback Singer	Sonu Nigam for "Kabhi Alvida Naa Kehna"	Nominated	
Zee Cine Awards	1 April 2007	Best Female Playback Singer	Alka Yagnik for "Tumhi Dekho Naa"	Won	
Zee Cine Awards	1 April 2007	Best Female Playback Singer	Vasundhara Das for "Where's The Party Tonight?"	Nominated	
Zee Cine Awards	1 April 2007	Best Track of the Year	"Kabhi Alvida Naa Kehna"	Nominated	
Zee Cine Awards	1 April 2007	Best Song Recording	Abhay Rumde, Shantanu Mukherjee	Nominated	
