= R&BA =

Studio album by BA Robertson
- Released: June 1982
- Studio: Mayfair Studios, London; Ardent Studios, Memphis; Marcus Recording Studios, London
- Genre: Pop rock; rock and roll; rhythm and blues
- Length: 39:40
- Label: Asylum
- Producer: BA Robertson

BA Robertson chronology
Bully for You (1981)	R&BA (1982)

Singles from R&BA
- 1. "Hold Me" Released: October 1981; 2. "Ready or Not" Released: February 1982; 3. "Dot Dot Dot" Released: July 1982; 4. "Now and Then" Released: March 1983

R&BA is the fifth and final studio album by the Scottish musician BA Robertson, released in June 1982 by Asylum Records. Unlike his previous two albums, it failed to chart, despite the success of some of its singles. The album was reissued on CD on 12 May 2017 by Cherry Red Records which included several bonus tracks.

== Release and reception ==
There were four singles released from the album. "Hold Me" is a cover of the song from 1933 and is a duet with Maggie Bell which peaked at number 11 on the UK Singles Chart. "Ready or Not" peaked at number 82 in the UK and is with the Memphis Horns. The single releases of "Hold Me" and "Ready or Not" credited Bell and The Memphis Horns on their front covers, yet they were only credited in the album's credits.

Ian Cantry of Louder than War said the album "treads very much a blues/soul path, with mixed results" and that "apart from ["Hold Me"] nothing much stands out – solid performances but few thrills". A notable cameo appearance on the album is Cliff Richard who provides backing vocals on "Son of a Gunn" which was co-written by Rick Parfitt of Status Quo.

After the release of this album, Robertson went on to write "We Have a Dream" for Scotland for the 1982 World Cup. A live version of this song by Robertson at the Edinburgh Fringe Festival is included as a bonus track of the expanded edition of the album.

Other bonus tracks included are a demo version of the theme tune to the television series Saturday Superstore, a piano demo version of "Legislate for Love" with John Barlow Jarvis, and a German version of his biggest hit "Bang Bang", which is humorously retitled "Bäng Bäng".

== Track listing ==
Side one
No.	Title	Writer(s)	Length
1.	"Dot Dot Dot"	BA Robertson, Billy Livsey	3:08
2.	"Ready or Not"	Robertson, Ralph Murphy, Roger Cook	3:08
3.	"Moscow Rules"	Robertson, Alan Tarney	4:30
4.	"Nothing Like a Great Romance"	Robertson	4:27
5.	"Four Minutes to Midnight"	Robertson	3:56

Side two
No.	Title	Writer(s)	Length
6.	"Hold Me"	Jack Little, Dave Oppenheim, Ira Schuster	3:15
7.	"Legislate for Love"	Robertson, Graham Jarvis	3:28
8.	"Son of a Gunn"	Robertson, Rick Parfitt	3:07
9.	"One Plus One"	Robertson, Terry Britten	4:03
10.	"Asleep With a Stranger"	Robertson	3:22
11.	"Just Like a Rash"	Robertson	3:16
Total length:			39:40

2017 bonus tracks:

No.	Title	Writer(s)	Length
12.	"Hold Me" (Single Version)	Little, Oppenheim, Schuster	2:59
13.	"Spring Greens"	Robertson	3:13
14.	"Les Beans"	Robertson	4:06
15.	"Keep Off the Grass"	Robertson	3:59
16.	"Saturday Superstore" (Demo)	Robertson	3:48
17.	"Legislate for Love" (Piano Vocal Demo with John Barlow Jarvis)	Robertson, Jarvis	2:38
18.	"We Have a Dream" (Live at the Edinburgh Fringe Festival, 2004)	Robertson	5:40
19.	"Asleep With a Stranger" (Live at the Edinburgh Fringe Festival, 2004)	Robertson	4:03
20.	"Bäng Bäng" (German Version)	Robertson, Britten	3:17

== Personnel ==
Musicians

- BA Robertson – vocals, strings
- Alan Gorrie – bass guitar, guitar (track 3), co-producer of rhythm tracks
- Graham Jarvis – drums
- Billy Bremner – guitar
- Billy Livsey – keyboards, melodica (track 10)
- The Memphis Horns:
  - Andrew Love – tenor and alto saxophones
  - Ben Cauley – trumpet
  - Jack Hale – trombone
  - Gary Topper – baritone saxophone
- Vaneese Thomas, Deborah Carter, Val Young, William C Brown – backing vocals
- Louise and Eunice – extra harmonies (track 1), backing vocals (track 2)
- Cliff Richard – all harmony vocals (track 8)
- Maggie Bell – vocals (track 6)
- Paul Jones – harmonica (track 6)
- Jim Mullen – bass guitar (track 3), guitar (tracks 5 and 9)
- Adrian Wyatt – extra guitars (tracks 2, 4, 8 and 11)
- Luís Jardim – percussion (track 11)
- Jeff Daly, Howie Casey – saxophones (track 6)

Technical

- John Hudson, Brian Tench – engineers at Mayfair Studios
- Bob Parr – assistant engineer at Mayfair Studios
- William C Brown, Robert Jackson – engineers for recording of horns and backing vocals at Ardent Studios
- Carl Marsh – horns arrangement at Ardent Studios
- Geoffrey Calver – engineer for recording of strings at Marcus Studios
- Mike McNaught – strings arrangement
- Sue Proudlove – art direction
- Niall Doull-Connolly – photography
