= Bully for You (album) =

Studio album by BA Robertson
- Released: 27 March 1981
- Studio: Mayfair Studios, London
- Genre: New wave
- Length: 39:00
- Label: Asylum
- Producer: Terry Britten

BA Robertson chronology
Initial Success (1980)	Bully for You (1981)	R&BA (1982)

Singles from Bully for You
- 1. "Flight 19" Released: October 1980; 2. "Saint Saens" Released: April 1981

Bully for You is the fourth studio album by Scottish musician BA Robertson, released on 27 March 1981 by Asylum Records. The album was not as successful as his previous album Initial Success, but managed to peak at number 61 on the UK Albums Chart. The album was reissued on CD on 12 May 2017 as an expanded edition by Cherry Red Records.

== Release ==
The two singles released from the album, "Flight 19" and "Saint Saens" were both commercial failures (although "Flight 19" did reach number 1 in Iceland), despite the fact that Robertson had an increased presence in the media since his debut album, with writing "Wired for Sound" for Cliff Richard, writing and performing the theme tune to the television series Maggie and co-hosting Top of the Pops. "Flight 19" is about the disappearance of the US aeroplanes in the Bermuda Triangle in 1945 and "Saint Saens" (which in the expanded edition of the album is written as Saint-Saëns) was originally titled "Sad Song", but was changed as a pun on the French composer.

Included with some releases of the album was a free 7" single titled "A Free B.A. From Middlesex Poly". The single was recorded live at Middlesex Polytechnic on 21 November 1980. The A-side "Sucker For Your Love" was recorded for the film The Monster Club which featured a performance by Robertson.

The first bonus track of the extended version, "BAR's on 45" is a medley of his hits "Flight 19", "To Be or Not to Be", "Knocked It Off", "Kool in the Kaftan", "Saint Saens" and "Bang Bang" in the style of the songs by Stars on 45. "Swap Shop" is a demo of "Hello Hello", the theme tune to the television series Multi-Coloured Swap Shop. "Maggie Thatcher" is monologue performed by Sheila Steafel imitating former Prime Minister Margaret Thatcher. The last track "Saint-Saëns" is a medley which was performed at the Edinburgh Fringe Festival in 2004.

== Track listing ==
Side one
No.	Title	Writer(s)	Length
1.	"Saint Saens"	BA Robertson, Terry Britten	2:54
2.	"Bully for You"	Robertson, Britten	2:45
3.	"Maggie"	Robertson	2:35
4.	"Growing Old's Unhealthy"	Robertson, Britten	3:18
5.	"Please Miss"	Robertson, Britten	3:38
6.	"In the Bar at the Munich Hilton"	Robertson, Britten, Alan Jones, Billy Livsey, Graham Jarvis	3:43

Side two
No.	Title	Writer(s)	Length
7.	"Dart Vader"	Robertson	3:37
8.	"Hey Presto"	Robertson, Britten	3:15
9.	"Flight 19"	Robertson, Britten	3:37
10.	"Only One"	Robertson, Britten	3:46
11.	"Turn the Volume Down"	Robertson, Britten	2:54
12.	"Home Sweet Home"	Robertson	2:58
Total length:			39:00

2017 bonus tracks:

No.	Title	Writer(s)	Length
13.	"BAR's on 45" (Medley)	Robertson, Britten	3:31
14.	"Alright on the Night"	Robertson, Britten, Jarvis	3:00
15.	"Maggie" (TV Theme Version)	Robertson	2:15
16.	"Swap Shop" (Demo)	Robertson	4:01
17.	"Maggie Thatcher"	Robertson	1:17
18.	"Man or a Mouse" (Live at All Saints College, Middlesex Polytechnic, 21/11/80)	Robertson	2:24
19.	"Gonzo for My Girlfriend" (Live at The Venue, London, 11/04/80)	Robertson	2:11
20.	"Saint-Saëns" (Medley; Live at the Edinburgh Fringe Festival, 2004)	Robertson, Britten	3:49

== Personnel ==
Musicians

- BA Robertson – lead vocals, backing vocals, strings
- Terry Britten – backing vocals, guitar
- John Clark – additional guitar
- Alan Jones – bass guitar
- Dave Olney – additional bass guitar
- Graham Jarvis – drums
- Billy Livsey – keyboards
- Ken Freeman – additional keyboards
- Mike McNaught – additional piano, strings
- Graham Todd – additional piano

Technical

- John Hudson – engineer
- Bob Parr – assistant engineer
- Ian Walker – art direction
- Niall Doull-Connolly – photography
- Recorded at Mayfair Studios, London, with strings arranged at CTS Studios, London

== Charts ==
Chart (1981)	Peak position
Icelandic Albums (Vísir)	1
UK Albums (OCC)	61
