= Initial Success =

Studio album by BA Robertson
- Released: 7 March 1980
- Studios: Mayfair Studios, London
- Genre: New wave
- Length: 39:37
- Label: Asylum
- Producer: Terry Britten

BA Robertson chronology
Shadow of a Thin Man (1976)	Initial Success (1980)	Bully for You (1981)

Singles from Initial Success
- 1. "Goosebumps" Released: January 1979; 2. "Bang Bang" Released: June 1979; 3. "Knocked It Off" Released: October 1979; 4. "Kool in the Kaftan" Released: 15 February 1980; 5. "To Be or Not to Be" Released: May 1980

Initial Success is the third studio album by Scottish musician BA Robertson, released on 7 March 1980 by Asylum Records. The album peaked at number 32 on the UK Albums Chart and several singles were released, including the top 10 hits "Bang Bang", "Knocked It Off" and "To Be or Not to Be". The album was reissued on CD on 12 May 2017 by Cherry Red Records and includes several of the singles' B-sides as well as songs performed live at the 2004 Edinburgh Fringe Festival.

== Background ==
Born in Glasgow, Brian Alexander Robertson began his musical career in 1973 with the release of his debut album Wringing Applause, a concept album recorded with Terry Manning and released on Ardent Records. Having found a new key collaborator in session bass player Herbie Flowers, Robertson released Shadow of a Thin Man in 1976 on Arista Records. Neither album found any success, and Robertson felt out of place amidst the progressive rock movement. Robertson soon found himself attuned with the burgeoning new wave movement, having heard "So It Goes" by Nick Lowe on the radio; Robertson has recalled "I thought - hey; hang on a second. I understand this more than ELP or dare I say Genesis or Yes. It sounded more like Ready Steady Go! to me, or Thank Your Lucky Stars. Robertson sent a four song demo tape to Warner Communications, and on the strength of "Goosebumps" was sent to Regent Sound, Denmark Street to record a professional demo. This led to a signing with Asylum Records.

== Release and reception ==
Professional ratings
Review scores
Source	Rating
Encyclopedia of Popular Music	3/5 stars
Record Mirror	2/5 stars
Record Collector	3/5 stars

Initial Success was released on 7 March 1980, following the success of the singles "Bang Bang", "Knocked It Off" and "Kool in the Kaftan". Robertson-Britten composition "Carrie" was a number 4 hit for Cliff Richard on 1 March 1980, a week prior the album's release. Robertson embarked on a 20-date UK tour in support of the album during April and May 1980.

Writing in Record Mirror, Robin Smith described Robertson as "trying too hard", commenting "experiencing Robertson fully unleashed is like being strapped into a chair where you're forced to watch 100 repeats of The Benny Hill Show". Smith considered "Eat Your Heart Out Sandy Nelson" the album's weakest track, and described "The B Side" as "a boring rock 'n' roll piss take that's been flogged time and time before". Though he praised "Knocked It Off" and "Man or a Mouse?", Smith declared "sorry chums, but I don't think the three minute hero can cut it for an entire album".

Reviewing the album's 2017 reissue, Record Collector's Mark Elliott commented "Bordering the novelty but BA’s offbeat lyrics don’t diminish a melodic flair". Ian Canty of Louder Than War considered Robertson's "in your face" nature to be detrimental to the songs, commenting "he’s always there, filling in any gaps with stupid voices and jokes, like a very nervous first dater scared of leaving a silence... ...though Robertson can without doubt come up with a good tune, he couldn’t leave it alone for any length of time". Canty concluded "Initial Success is really a well-produced, inventive record, but a bit faddy and flaunts its cleverness just a bit too much for me".

== Track listing ==
Side one
No.	Title	Writer(s)	Length
1.	"Gonzo for My Girlfriend"	BA Robertson	2:40
2.	"Man or a Mouse?"	Robertson	2:22
3.	"Goosebumps"	Robertson, Terry Britten	2:31
4.	"Fallin in Luv"	Robertson, Britten	3:03
5.	"Kool in the Kaftan"	Robertson, Britten	3:31
6.	"Bang Bang"	Robertson, Britten	3:19
7.	"Eat Your Heart Out Sandy Nelson"	Robertson, Mike McNaught	2:01

Side two
No.	Title	Writer(s)	Length
8.	"The B Side"	Robertson	2:38
9.	"To Be or Not to Be"	Robertson, Britten	3:19
10.	"She's a Beezer"	Robertson, Britten	2:45
11.	"England's Green & Pheasant Land"	Robertson	3:08
12.	"Walking Rover"	Robertson, Britten	3:21
13.	"Knocked It Off"	Robertson, Britten	3:24
14.	"Here I Sit"	Robertson	1:35
Total length:			39:37

2017 bonus tracks:

No.	Title	Writer(s)	Length
15.	"2(b) B Side the C Side"	Robertson	3:50
16.	"Sci Fi"	Robertson, Britten	3:02
17.	"Baby I'm a Bat"	Robertson, Britten	3:29
18.	"Goosebumps" (Single Version)	Robertson, Britten	2:53
19.	"Bang Bang" (Performed by the Portsmouth Sinfonia)	Robertson, Britten	2:27
20.	"Language of Love/Hot Shot" (Live at The Venue, London, 11/04/80)	Robertson, Britten	7:17
21.	"Bang Bang" (Live at the Edinburgh Fringe Festival, 2004)	Robertson, Britten	3:20
22.	"To Be or Not to Be" (Live at the Edinburgh Fringe Festival, 2004)	Robertson, Britten	2:59
23.	"Kool in the Kaftan" (Live at the Edinburgh Fringe Festival, 2004)	Robertson, Britten	2:42

== Personnel ==
Musicians

- BA Robertson – lead vocals, backing vocals, additional keyboards
- Terry Britten – backing vocals, guitar, sitar (track 5)
- Alan Jones – bass guitar
- John Giblin – additional bass guitar
- Graham Jarvis – drums
- Stuart Elliott – additional drums
- Billy Livsey – keyboards
- Adrian Lee, Mike McNaught – additional keyboards
- Barry Morgan, Chris Karan, Jim Lawless, Lennie Clarke, Louis Jordan, Pete Baron, Tony Carr – percussion
- Neil Sorrell – sarangi (track 13)

Technical

- John Hudson – engineer
- Richard Savage – art direction
- Bob Searles – illustration
- Niall Doull-Connolly, Adrian Boot – photography
- Recorded at Mayfair Studios, London and mastered at Utopia Studios, London

== Charts ==
Chart (1980)	Peak position
Icelandic Albums (Vísir)	1
UK Albums (Official Charts)	32
