= We Don't Talk Anymore =

We Don't Talk Anymore may refer to:

- "We Don't Talk Anymore" (Cliff Richard song), 1979
  - Rock 'n' Roll Juvenile, 1979 also known in the United States as We Don't Talk Anymore
- "We Don't Talk Anymore" (Charlie Puth song), 2016
