= To Be or Not to Be (BA Robertson song) =

1980 single by BA Robertson

Single by BA Robertson

from the album Initial Success
- B-side: "Language of Love"/"Hot Shot"
- Released: May 1980
- Genre: New wave
- Length: 3:20
- Label: Asylum
- Songwriter(s): BA Robertson; Terry Britten
- Producer(s): Terry Britten

BA Robertson singles chronology
"Kool in the Kaftan" (1980)	"To Be or Not to Be" (1980)	"Flight 19" (1980)

"To Be or Not to Be" is a song by Scottish musician BA Robertson, released in May 1980 as the fifth and final single from his debut album Initial Success. It became his third Top-Ten hit in the UK, peaking at number 9 on the Singles Chart.

In the UK and some other countries, the single was released with two B-sides "Language of Love" and "Hot Shot". Whereas, elsewhere, such as Germany, "Language of Love" was the only B-side. The B-side tracks were recorded live at The Venue in London on 11 April 1980. The single did not appear on Top of the Pops, which was out of production during the summer of 1980 because of a strike by the Musician's Union.

== Lyrics ==
The song takes its inspiration from William Shakespeare, with the title coming from "To be, or not to be", from Hamlet. The lyrics feature a number of inaccuracies and absurdities: that Hamlet "made it" with his mother and that Shakespeare was "queer" (which had to be censored) and that he "dressed his guys as chicks". The lyrics make reference to Romeo and Juliet, Twelfth Night, As You Like It and Hamlet.

== Reception ==
Reviewing the song for Record Mirror, Rosalind Russell wrote that "this record can't fail. Even though BA employs some bizarre rhyming couplets, he produced singles worth remembering" and that "I can overlook him rhyming Romeo with home-o, just because he thinks up tricky ideas and twists them to suit his songs. His looks are tenacious, but he uses his gimmicks, works with them and comes up with records that sound totally original".

== Charts ==
Chart (1980)	Peak position
Australia (Kent Music Report)	82
Germany (GfK)	34
Ireland (IRMA)	7
Netherlands (Single Top 100)	29
UK Singles (OCC)	9
