= Hot Shot (Cliff Richard song) =

1979 song by Cliff Richard

Single by Cliff Richard

from the album Rock 'n' Roll Juvenile
- B-side: "Walking in the Light"
- Released: 19 October 1979
- Recorded: 7–12 January & 17 February 1979
- Studio: Pathé-Marconi, Paris; Abbey Road, London
- Genre: Power pop
- Length: 3:23
- Label: EMI
- Songwriter(s): Terry Britten; BA Robertson
- Producer(s): Cliff Richard; Terry Britten

Cliff Richard singles chronology
"We Don't Talk Anymore" (1979)	"Hot Shot" (1979)	"Carrie" (1979)

Music video
- "Hot Shot" on YouTube

"Hot Shot" is a song performed by Cliff Richard and released as a single in October 1979. Written by Terry Britten and B. A. Robertson, it was the second single lifted from Richard's 1979 album Rock 'n' Roll Juvenile. It reached no. 46 in the UK Singles Chart.

== Release ==
"Hot Shot" was released as the follow-up single to the international hit "We Don't Talk Anymore". However, it failed to repeat its success, failing to make the top 40 in the UK, peaking at number 46 and spending a total of five weeks in the top 75. It did, however, perform better in Ireland, peaking at number 27.

For the compilation album My Kinda Life – A Selection of 14 Great Songs 1992 Version, new instrumentation, recorded in April 1992, was added to an alternative take of the original song.

== Track listings ==
7": EMI / EMI 5003

1. "Hot Shot" – 3:23
2. "Walking in the Light" – 3:17

== Personnel ==
- Cliff Richard – vocals, backing vocals
- Terry Britten – guitar, backing vocals
- Madelaine Bell – backing vocals
- Herbie Flowers – bass
- Graham Jarvis – drums, percussion
- Billy Livsey – keyboards
- Tristan Fry – percussion
- Mel Collins – brass
- Martin Drover – brass
- Chris Mercer – brass

== Chart performance ==
Chart (1979)	Peak position
Ireland (IRMA)	27
UK Singles (OCC)	46

== Cover versions ==
- In May 1980, BA Robertson released his own version as the B-side to "To Be or Not to Be". It was a live medley with "Language of Love", recorded in April 1980 at The Venue, London. "Language of Love" had also been first recorded by Richard for Rock 'n' Roll Juvenile.
- In 1981, Clout covered the song on their album A Threat and a Promise; however, it is incorrectly credited to Hall and Oates.
