= BA Robertson =

Scottish musician, composer and songwriter

- Born: Brian Alexander Robertson; Glasgow, Scotland
- Genres: Rock; pop; new wave
- Occupations: Musician; singer; songwriter; producer
- Instruments: Vocals; keyboards
- Years active: 1973–present
- Labels: Ardent; Asylum; Epic; Swan Song
- Website: barobertson.com

Brian Alexander Robertson is a Scottish musician, composer and songwriter. He had a string of hits in the late 1970s and early 1980s, including "Kool in the Kaftan", "Knocked It Off", "To Be or Not to Be" and "Bang Bang". With Mike Rutherford of Genesis, he wrote the Grammy-nominated and Ivor Novello Award-winning song "The Living Years", which was a number one hit in the US, Canada, Australia and Ireland, and reached number two in his native UK; as well as the earlier hit for Rutherford's band Mike and the Mechanics, "Silent Running (On Dangerous Ground)". He has also written music for films.

== Early life ==
Born in Glasgow, Robertson was educated at the former Allan Glen's School, Glasgow, and the Royal Conservatoire of Scotland, formerly the Royal Scottish Academy of Music & Drama.

== Career ==
He released his debut album Wringing Applause, recorded with Terry Manning, on the Ardent Records label (also home of Big Star) in 1973, but it was to be a further six years until he found success in the United Kingdom chart.

Robertson had hits from 1979 to 1981 in the UK Singles Chart, the first of which – "Bang Bang" – reached number 2 in September 1979. Follow-up singles "Knocked It Off", "Kool in the Kaftan" and "To Be or Not to Be" reached chart positions 8, 17 and 9 respectively. All the singles came from his third album Initial Success, which reached number 32 in the UK Albums Chart. In 1981 he had his last top 40 hit under his own name (to date) performing a duet with Maggie Bell, a cover version of "Hold Me" which reached number 11.

He co-wrote the hit songs "Carrie" and "Wired for Sound" for Cliff Richard and seven of the 12 songs on Richard's Rock 'n' Roll Juvenile (1979) album. Robertson wrote and sang the theme music to the television series Maggie and Multi-Coloured Swap Shop ("Hello, Hello"), and wrote and sang backing vocals for the Swap Shop spin-off group Brown Sauce's UK No 15 hit, "I Wanna Be a Winner". In 1982, Robertson composed "Down at the Superstore", the theme to the BBC1 children's television series Saturday Superstore. It was released as a single by The Assistants, a supergroup featuring Robertson, Dave Edmunds, Cheryl Baker, Junior and Suzi Quatro.

Robertson was a guest presenter on Top of the Pops on 28 August 1980, alongside then-BBC Radio 1 DJ Peter Powell. In October 1980, Robertson appeared as a guest on the BBC Television chat show Friday Night, Saturday Morning. In the sixth and final series of the same show, Robertson appeared on one programme (January 1982) as the show's host. In February 1981 Robertson appeared playing live in concert on the BBC joint television and radio programme Rock Goes to College. He appeared at the then Preston Polytechnic, Lancashire.

Robertson presented a two-part documentary, Jock 'n' Roll Parts I & II, charting the history of pop music in Scotland, and presented a short-lived television programme, B. A. in Music, which featured contributions from musician guests.

Robertson wrote "We Have a Dream" for the 1982 World Cup Scotland squad, and played the lead in the film Living Apart Together, directed by Charlie Gormley.

Beginning in 1985, Robertson regularly wrote songs with Mike Rutherford for Rutherford's band Mike + The Mechanics. He contributed to all the albums released by the original configuration of the band, from Mike + The Mechanics to Rewired. Among the songs Robertson and Rutherford wrote together are the hits "Silent Running" and "The Living Years". The latter was written after Robertson's father died twelve weeks before the birth of his own son, and was nominated for a Grammy Award for Song of the Year in 1990.

In 1987, Robertson co-wrote several and produced two tracks on the Eddie and the Tide album Looking for Adventure. In 1991, Robertson was billed as the co-producer and executive musical producer for Simply Mad About the Mouse: A Musical Celebration of Imagination (ISBN 1-55890-217-1), a 1991 direct-to-video release featuring top contemporary singers performing "classic Disney songs".

Robertson appeared on the Scottish segment of BBC's Children in Need telethon on 14 November 2008, performing a re-worked version of "We Have a Dream" alongside Edwyn Collins, The Gospel Truth Choir, the Tartan Army, and various Scottish celebrities. On 16 January 2010, he performed with a live band in Glasgow as part of the Celtic Connections Festival. "A Scottish Songbook" featured a number of diverse artists performing songs written by Scots, and Robertson performed "Twisted" (written by Annie Ross and Wardell Gray) and his own "The Living Years" – backed by house band Session A9 and The Gospel Truth Choir. The event was filmed for subsequent broadcast by BBC Scotland.

A new version of "The Living Years" was released as a single in July 2020, under his own name. A newly released version of "Silent Running" by Robertson was issued on 22 July 2022, with all proceeds from the recording for the Mail Force-Ukraine Appeal.

On New Year's Day 2024, BBC Radio Scotland broadcast Tartan Top Of The Pops celebrating the Scots who had performed over the 60 years of the programme. In an interview with Grant Stott it was revealed that Robertson's first of 18 appearances was playing keyboard with Steve Harley & Cockney Rebel.

== Discography ==
=== Albums ===
| Year | Album | Label | UK |
|---|---|---|---|
| 1973 | Wringing Applause (released as Brian Alexander Robertson) | Ardent | — |
| 1976 | Shadow of a Thin Man (released as Alexander Robertson) | Arista | — |
| 1980 | Initial Success | Asylum | 32 |
| 1981 | Bully for You | Asylum | 61 |
| 1982 | R&BA | Asylum | — |
| 2005 | The Platinum Collection | Warner | — |
"—" denotes releases that did not chart.

=== Singles ===
| Year | Single | Chart Positions | | | | | | | | Certifications | Album |
| Year | Single | AUS | AUT | BEL | GER | ICE | IRE | NED | UK | Certifications | Album |
|---|---|---|---|---|---|---|---|---|---|---|---|
| 1973 | "Moira's Hand" (released as Brian Alexander Robertson) | — | — | — | — | x | — | — | — | | Wringing Applause |
| 1976 | "All the Thin Men" (released as Alexander Robertson) | — | — | — | — | x | — | — | — | | Shadow of a Thin Man |
| 1979 | "Goosebumps" | — | — | — | — | x | — | — | — | | Initial Success |
| 1979 | "Bang Bang" | 53 | 13 | 15 | 6 | x | 5 | 42 | 2 | BPI: Silver | Initial Success |
| 1979 | "Knocked It Off" | — | — | — | — | x | 8 | — | 8 | BPI: Silver | Initial Success |
| 1980 | "Kool in the Kaftan" | — | — | — | — | x | 20 | — | 17 | | Initial Success |
| 1980 | "To Be or Not to Be" | 82 | — | — | 34 | x | 7 | 29 | 9 | | Initial Success |
| 1980 | "Flight 19" | — | — | — | — | 1 | 26 | — | — | | Bully for You |
| 1981 | "Sucker for Your Love" (7-inch promo) | — | — | — | — | — | — | — | — | | Non-album single |
| 1981 | "Saint Saens" | — | — | — | — | — | — | — | — | | Bully for You |
| 1981 | "Hold Me" (with Maggie Bell) | 31 | — | — | — | — | 11 | — | 11 | | R&BA |
| 1982 | "Ready or Not" (with The Memphis Horns) | — | — | — | — | — | — | — | — | | R&BA |
| 1982 | "Dot Dot Dot" | — | — | — | — | — | — | — | — | | R&BA |
| 1983 | "Now and Then" | — | — | — | — | — | — | — | 82 | | R&BA |
| 1983 | "Time" (with Frida) (ABBA's instrumental track "Arrival", with added lyrics) | — | — | — | — | — | — | — | 45 | | ABBAcadabra |
| 1986 | "Ceud Mìle Failte" ("A Hundred Thousand Welcomes") (BBC Commonwealth Games Theme) | — | — | — | — | — | — | — | — | | Non-album single |
"—" denotes releases that did not chart. "x" denotes that chart did not exist at the time.

=== Songs written for others ===
Excludes covers of songs originally sung by Robertson

| Year | Title | Artist | Co-writer(s) | Notes |
|---|---|---|---|---|
| 1974 | "To Get a Laugh" | Ronnie Corbett | — | |
| 1976 | "Dancing at Danny's" | Herbie Flowers | Herbie Flowers | |
| 1977 | "News" | Herbie Flowers | — | |
| 1978 | "Don't Take My Bass Away" | Herbie Flowers | Herbie Flowers | |
| 1978 | "Circus Clown" | Patti Boulaye | Mike McNaught | |
| 1978 | "Start All Over Again" | Cliff Richard | Terry Britten | |
| 1979 | "Here in L.A." | Filmstars | Phil Wainman | |
| 1979 | "Under Fire" | Clout | Terry Britten | |
| 1979 | "Magic Rhythm" | Christie Allen | Terry Britten | |
| 1979 | "All Australian Female" | Christie Allen | Terry Britten | |
| 1979 | "Only Yes Will Do" | Christie Allen | Terry Britten | |
| 1979 | "He's My Number One" | Christie Allen | Terry Britten | |
| 1979 | "Carrie" | Cliff Richard | Terry Britten | |
| 1979 | "Hot Shot" | Cliff Richard | Terry Britten | Richard released the original version, with Robertson releasing a live version in medley with "Language of Love" on the B-side to "To Be or Not to Be" in 1980 |
| 1979 | "My Luck Won't Change" | Cliff Richard | Terry Britten | |
| 1979 | "Cities May Fall" | Cliff Richard | Terry Britten | |
| 1979 | "Sci-Fi" | Cliff Richard | Terry Britten | |
| 1979 | "Falling in Luv" | Cliff Richard | Terry Britten | |
| 1979 | "Language of Love" | Cliff Richard | Terry Britten | Richard released the original version, with Robertson releasing a live version in medley with "Hot Shot" on the B-side to "To Be or Not to Be" in 1980 |
| 1980 | "Switchboard" | Christie Allen | Georg Kajanus | |
| 1980 | "Only Yes Will Do" | Mary Stävin | Terry Britten | |
| 1980 | "Teacher" | Mary Stävin | Terry Britten | |
| 1981 | "Wired for Sound" | Cliff Richard | Alan Tarney | |
| 1981 | "I Wanna Be a Winner" | Brown Sauce | Noel Edmonds | |
| 1981 | "Hello Hello" | Brown Sauce | — | |
| 1982 | "Croque Monsieur" | N.E.R.O. (Noel Edmonds Radio Orchestra) | — | |
| 1982 | "Slice 2" | N.E.R.O. (Noel Edmonds Radio Orchestra) | Terry Britten | |
| 1982 | "Spring Has Sprung" | The Saucers (Keith Chegwin and Maggie Philbin) | Billy Livsey | Performed in last ever episode of Swap Shop |
| 1982 | "Major Breakthrough" | The Saucers (Keith Chegwin and Maggie Philbin) | — | Performed in last ever episode of Swap Shop |
| 1982 | "We Have a Dream" | The Scottish World Cup Squad | — | |
| 1982 | "Wrap Up the Cup" | The Scottish World Cup Squad | — | |
| 1982 | "Pumpin' & Blowin'" | Kristy McNichol | Terry Britten and Sue Shifrin | From the soundtrack to the film The Pirate Movie |
| 1982 | "Happy Ending" | The Peter Cupples Band | Terry Britten and Sue Shifrin | From the soundtrack to the film The Pirate Movie |
| 1982 | "Down at the Superstore" (Theme from Saturday Superstore) | The Assistants | Alec and Pearl | Robertson was part of 'The Assistants' |
| 1982 | "Half Day Closing (Down at the Superstore)" | The Assistants | Alec and Pearl | Robertson was part of 'The Assistants' |
| 1984 | "Little Angel" | Dolly Dots | Pete Bellotte | |
| 1985 | "Silent Running (On Dangerous Ground)" | Mike + the Mechanics | Mike Rutherford | |
| 1985 | "Hanging By a Thread" | Mike + the Mechanics | Mike Rutherford and Christopher Neil | |
| 1985 | "Take the Reins" | Mike + the Mechanics | Mike Rutherford and Christopher Neil | |
| 1985 | "A Call to Arms" | Mike + the Mechanics | Mike Rutherford, Christopher Neil, Phil Collins and Tony Banks | |
| 1985 | "The Other Side of the World" | Chaka Khan | Mike Rutherford | From the soundtrack to the film White Nights |
| 1986 | "Silhouette" | Albert Hammond and Albert West | Albert Hammond | |
| 1987 | "Power Play" | Eddie & the Tide | Phil Pickett | From the soundtrack to the film The Lost Boys |
| 1987 | "Waiting for the One" | Eddie & the Tide | Steve "Eddie" Rice | |
| 1987 | "Stand a Little Rain" | Eddie & the Tide | Steve "Eddie" Rice | |
| 1987 | "Making History" | Eddie & the Tide | Steve "Eddie" Rice | |
| 1987 | "Bitter Harvest" | Eddie & the Tide | Steve "Eddie" Rice | |
| 1987 | "Let It Be Love" | Eddie & the Tide | Steve "Eddie" Rice | |
| 1988 | "Nobody's Perfect" | Mike + the Mechanics | Mike Rutherford | |
| 1988 | "The Living Years" | Mike + the Mechanics | Mike Rutherford | |
| 1988 | "Seeing Is Believing" | Mike + the Mechanics | Mike Rutherford | |
| 1988 | "Why Me?" | Mike + the Mechanics | Mike Rutherford | |
| 1988 | "Black & Blue" | Mike + the Mechanics | Mike Rutherford and Paul Young | |
| 1989 | "People All over the World" | Pete Frampton | Pete Frampton | Also performed some backing vocals and synthesisers |
| 1989 | "Now and Again" | Pete Frampton | Pete Frampton and John Regan | Also performed some guitar |
| 1990 | "Barrière des générations" | Richard Anthony | Mike Rutherford and Jean-Pierre Lang | |
| 1991 | "A Time and Place" | Mike + the Mechanics | Mike Rutherford | |
| 1991 | "Yesterday, Today, Tomorrow" | Mike + the Mechanics | Mike Rutherford | |
| 1991 | "Everybody Gets a Second Chance" | Mike + the Mechanics | Mike Rutherford | |
| 1991 | "Let's Pretend It Didn't Happen" | Mike + the Mechanics | Mike Rutherford | |
| 1991 | "I Think I've Got the Message" | Mike + the Mechanics | Mike Rutherford | |
| 1993 | "With Your Hand on My Heart" | Michael Crawford and Patti LaBelle | Jeremy Lubbock and Melissa Vardey | |
| 1994 | "I Believe" | David Hasselhoff and Laura Branigan | John Lewis Parker | Theme song for season 5 of Baywatch |
| 1995 | "Somewhere in Time" | Michael Crawford | John Barry | |
| 1995 | "Open Your Eyes" | Michael Crawford | Michael Crawford and Don Grady | |
| 1995 | "A Beggar on a Beach of Gold" | Mike + the Mechanics | Mike Rutherford | |
| 1995 | "The Ghost of Sex and You" | Mike + the Mechanics | Mike Rutherford | |
| 1995 | "Plain and Simple" | Mike + the Mechanics | Mike Rutherford | |
| 1995 | "A House of Many Rooms" | Mike + the Mechanics | Mike Rutherford | |
| 1999 | "Across the Bridge of Hope" | Omagh Community Youth Choir | — | Also performed piano and was the producer |
| 1999 | "All The Light I Need" | Mike + the Mechanics | Mike Rutherford | |
| 1999 | "What Will You Do" | Mike + the Mechanics | Mike Rutherford | |
| 1999 | "My Little Island" | Mike + the Mechanics | Mike Rutherford | |
| 1999 | "Look Across at Dreamland" | Mike + the Mechanics | Mike Rutherford | |
| 2003 | "One Small Step | Paul Carrack | Paul Carrack | |
| 2004 | "If I Were You" | Mike + the Mechanics | Mike Rutherford and Paul Carrack | |
| 2004 | "Perfect Child" | Mike + the Mechanics | Mike Rutherford and Paul Carrack | |
| 2004 | "Somewhere Along the Line | Mike + the Mechanics | Mike Rutherford and Paul Carrack | |

== Filmography ==
=== Film ===
| Year | Title | Role | Notes |
|---|---|---|---|
| 1981 | The Monster Club | Entertainers | |
| 1982 | Living Apart Together | Ritchie Hannah | |
| 1986 | Heavenly Pursuits | | Wrote filmscore |

=== Television ===
| Year | Title | Role | Notes |
|---|---|---|---|
| 1979–1981 | Top of the Pops | Himself | |
| 1980 | Ask Aspel | Himself | 1 episode |
| 1980 | Jim'll Fix It | Himself | 1 episode |
| 1980–1981 | Cheggers Plays Pop | Himself | 2 episodes |
| 1980, 1982 | Friday Night, Saturday Morning | Himself | 2 episodes |
| 1981 | Rock Goes to College | Himself | 1 episode |
| 1981 | The Kenny Everett Video Cassette | Himself | 1 episode |
| 1981 | Saturday Night at the Mill | Himself | 1 episode |
| 1981 | Six Fifty-Five Special | Himself | 1 episode |
| 1981 | Jock and Roll | Himself | Television film |
| 1981–1982 | Multi-Coloured Swap Shop | Himself | 2 episodes |
| 1981–1983 | Pop Quiz | Himself | 3 episodes |
| 1982 | Dear Heart | | 6 episodes |
| 1982 | The Kenny Everett Television Show | Himself | 1 episode |
| 1982 | B.A. in Music | Himself | 7 episodes |
| 1982–1983 | Saturday Superstore | Himself | 3 episodes |
| 1983 | Diane Solomon Entertains | Himself | Television film |
| 1985 | Kenny Everett's Christmas Carol | Bob Cratchit | Television film |
| 2000 | 100 Greatest TV Moments from Hell | Himself | Archive footage |

== See also ==
- List of songs that retell a work of literature
- List of performers on Top of the Pops
- List of performances on Top of the Pops
