= We Don't Talk Anymore (Cliff Richard song) =

1979 single by Cliff Richard

Single by Cliff Richard

from the album Rock 'n' Roll Juvenile
- B-side: "Count Me Out"
- Released: 6 July 1979
- Recorded: 29 May 1979
- Studio: RG Jones, London, UK
- Genre: Pop rock; glam rock
- Length: 4:13; 3:40 (US 7-inch version); 6:54 (European 12-inch version)
- Label: EMI
- Songwriter: Alan Tarney
- Producer: Bruce Welch

Cliff Richard singles chronology
"Green Light" (1979)	"We Don't Talk Anymore" (1979)	"Hot Shot" (1979)

Cliff Richard (US/Europe/Australia) singles chronology
"Green Light" (1979)	"We Don't Talk Anymore" (1979)	"Carrie" (1980)

Music video
- "We Don't Talk Anymore" on YouTube

"We Don't Talk Anymore" is a song written by Alan Tarney. It was sung by Cliff Richard in a recording produced by the Shadows' rhythm guitarist, Bruce Welch; this was released in 1979 as a single and reached number one on the UK singles chart in August 1979, remaining there for four weeks, becoming Richard's tenth UK number one and his first since "Congratulations" in 1968.

== Background ==
Alan Tarney wrote the song in 1979, planning to use it on an album with the Tarney/Spencer Band. However, he played a demo of the song to Bruce Welch during a break in recording sessions for the album Where to Now by Charlie Dore (which the two were producing). Welch instantly knew it would become a hit, and telephoned Cliff Richard's manager Peter Gormley, for he believed "there was only one person who could record it — Cliff Richard". It was then quickly recorded in May 1979 at RG Jones Recording Studios in Wimbledon.

It was at first released as a stop-gap single between the albums Green Light and Rock 'n' Roll Juvenile. Richard did not intend it to be included on Rock 'n' Roll Juvenile, believing it inappropriate for "an energy packed album of progressive rock 'n' roll". However, record label EMI was insistent on including it after it became a massive hit, and Richard reluctantly conceded. Due to the single's success, Tarney was brought in to produce Richard's next two albums I'm No Hero and Wired for Sound, and subsequently said that "'We Don't Talk Anymore' should really have been on I'm No Hero".

The single release featured the B-side "Count Me Out", which was written by Bruce Welch and Terry Britten, and was taken from Green Light. In several European countries a 12-inch single was released featuring an extended slightly remixed version of "We Don't Talk Anymore" almost seven minutes in length. This version has never been released on CD. The US release of the single features an edited version of "We Don't Talk Anymore", which fades over half a minute early.

A remixed version of "We Don't Talk Anymore" was released as a single in continental Europe in December 1990, and in Australasia in November 1991. Taken from the live album From a Distance: The Event, it was remixed by Ian Curnow and Phil Harding at the PWL Studios. The single failed to chart.

One of the record-breaking statistics often cited about Richard is his achievement of number-one hit singles in five consecutive decades. This single is significant in being his only number one hit of the 1970s.

== Commercial reception ==
Coming just before his 39th birthday, and just when it was announced that he was to receive the OBE for services to music, the record cemented his comeback, which continued well into the 1980s and 1990s. The single was his biggest worldwide seller; it was number one in Germany for five weeks (his only English-language German chart-topper, though he had had two German-language number ones there in the 1960s), and reached number seven on the Billboard Hot 100 singles chart in the United States. The fact that its chart run extended beyond the end of 1979 meant Richard became the first act to reach the Hot 100's top 40 in the 1950s, 1960s, 1970s and 1980s.

The single sold over 4 million copies worldwide, topping the charts in the UK, Austria, Belgium (Flanders), Finland, West Germany, Ireland, Norway and Switzerland. The song spent four weeks atop the Irish Singles Chart in September 1979. The song was certified Gold in both the UK and West Germany.

During the single's run as number one on the UK singles chart, Norrie Paramor, Richard's original producer who guided the singer's early career in the late 1950s and 1960s, died on 9 September 1979.

The song was the sixth video aired on MTV on its launch on 1 August 1981.

== Track listings ==
=== 1979 releases ===
7"

1. "We Don't Talk Anymore" – 4:13
2. "Count Me Out" – 4:15

7" (US)

1. "We Don't Talk Anymore" – 3:40
2. "Count Me Out" – 4:13

12"

1. "We Don't Talk Anymore" – 6:54
2. "Count Me Out" – 4:11

=== 1990 releases ===
7" & Cassette

1. "We Don't Talk Anymore" – 4:38
2. "From a Distance" – 4:41

12" & CD

1. "We Don't Talk Anymore" – 8:13
2. "From a Distance" – 4:41
3. "We Don't Talk Anymore" – 4:38

== Personnel ==
- Cliff Richard – vocals
- Alan Tarney – guitar, keyboards, synthesizer, bass, backing vocals
- Trevor Spencer – drums

== Charts and certifications ==
=== Weekly charts ===
Chart (1979–80)	Peak position
Australia (Kent Music Report)	3
Austria (Ö3 Austria Top 40)	1
Belgium (Ultratop 50 Flanders)	1
Canada Top Singles (RPM)	4
Denmark (IFPI)	1
Finland (Suomen virallinen lista)	1
Europe (Europarade)	1
Ireland (IRMA)	1
Israel (Kol Israel)	1
Italy (Musica e dischi)	13
Netherlands (Dutch Top 40)	3
Netherlands (Single Top 100)	4
New Zealand (Recorded Music NZ)	5
Norway (VG-lista)	1
Portugal (Música & Som)	1
South Africa (Springbok Radio)	2
Spain (AFYVE)	6
Sweden (Sverigetopplistan)	4
Switzerland (Schweizer Hitparade)	1
UK Singles (Official Charts)	1
US Billboard Hot 100	7
US Adult Contemporary (Billboard)	5
US Cash Box Top 100	6
West Germany (GfK)	1

=== Year-end charts ===
Chart (1979)	Peak position
Australia (Kent Music Report)	24
Belgium (Ultratop Flanders)	10
Denmark (IFPI)	13
Netherlands (Dutch Top 40)	24
Netherlands (Single Top 100)	68
New Zealand (Recorded Music NZ)	46
South Africa (Springbok Radio)	20
Switzerland (Schweizer Hitparade)	5
UK (Official Charts Company)	3
West Germany (Official German Charts)	42

Chart (1980)	Peak position
Canada Top Singles (RPM)	29
Italy (Musica e dischi)	70
US Top Pop Singles (Billboard)	45
US (Cash Box)	86

=== Certifications ===
Certifications for We Don't Talk Anymore
Region	Certification	Certified units/sales
Germany (BVMI)	Gold	500,000^{^}
Netherlands (NVPI)	Gold	100,000^{^}
United Kingdom (BPI)	Gold	500,000^{^}
^{^} Shipments figures based on certification alone.

== Other versions ==
- Due to sanctions on the EMI label in Rhodesia (now known as Zimbabwe), Richard's version was not able to be released there. Therefore, a cover version by Robin Young was released, which peaked at number 2 in December 1979.
- In 1979, Mary Roos released a German-language version of the song, titled "Ich werde geh'n heute Nacht", which peaked at number 25 on the German Singles Chart.
- In 1980, Brotherhood of Man covered the song on their album Sing 20 Number One Hits.
- In 1981, the Shadows released an instrumental version of the song on their album Hits Right Up Your Street.
- In 1982, Cliff Richard recorded a live version with the London Philharmonic Orchestra, which was released on the 1983 album Dressed for the Occasion.
