= Saturday Superstore =

BBC children's television series (1982–1987)

- Genre: Children's
- Presented by: Mike Read; Sarah Greene (series 2–5); Keith Chegwin; John Craven; Phillip Hodson; Maggie Philbin (series 1); Crow
- Country of origin: United Kingdom
- Original language: English
- No. of series: 5
- No. of episodes: 142

Production
- Production location: BBC Television Centre
- Running time: 165–195 minutes

Original release
- Network: BBC1
- Release: 2 October 1982 – 18 April 1987

Saturday Superstore is a British children's television series that aired on BBC1 from 2 October 1982 to 18 April 1987. It was shown on Saturday mornings with presenters including Mike Read, Sarah Greene, Keith Chegwin, and John Craven. The show was very similar to its predecessor Multi-Coloured Swap Shop, which had ended the previous October–March season following its presenter Noel Edmonds moving away from children's TV to present his prime-time Late Late Breakfast Show.

== Content ==
A regular spot on the show was their children's talent show "Search for a Superstar". The winner of the 1986 search were Claire and Friends, spawning the top-20 hit "It's 'Orrible Being in Love (When You're 8½)". In 1987, the contest was won by Juvenile Jazz, which included future OMD and occasional Stone Roses keyboard-player Nigel Ipinson.

For much of its run, Saturday Superstore retained the same famous phone-in number, 01-811-8055, as its predecessor.

Amongst its most memorable moments were the pop group Matt Bianco being verbally abused by a phone-in caller and The Flying Pickets offering as a competition prize a tea-towel bearing the face of Karl Marx.

The presenters released a single entitled "Two Left Feet", though it failed to chart. The theme tune, entitled "Down At The Store", was also released by The Assistants, consisting of Dave Edmunds, B. A. Robertson, Cheryl Baker, Junior and Suzi Quatro.

Then Prime Minister Margaret Thatcher appeared in one show in 1987 leading up to that year's election campaign, making the newspaper headlines when she was repeatedly asked by a girl "In the event of a nuclear war, where will you be?".

== It Started With Swap Shop ==
Saturday Superstore had its own section of the BBC's It Started With Swap Shop in 2006. It featured Keith Chegwin chatting to Mike Read and Crow. Mike Read, John Craven and Keith Chegwin took part in the 'Now That's What I Call Saturday Mornings Quiz' for the Saturday Superstore part of the show and a selection of clips from the show were shown.

== Transmissions ==
Series	Start date	End date	Episodes
1	2 October 1982	26 March 1983	25
2	1 October 1983	14 April 1984	28
3	29 September 1984	13 April 1985	29
4	28 September 1985	19 April 1986	30
5	27 September 1986	18 April 1987	30
