= St Paul's Catholic School, Leicester =

Saint Paul's Catholic School

Location
- Spencefield Lane; Leicester, Leicestershire, LE5 6HN; England; 52°37′43″N 1°04′08″W

Information
- Type: Academy
- Religious affiliation: Roman Catholic
- Established: 1977
- Local authority: Leicester
- Department for Education URN: 146232 Tables
- Ofsted: Reports
- Joint Chair of Governors: Terri Warzynski & Fiona Harris
- Principal: Shelley Conaghan
- Staff: 120+
- Gender: Coeducational
- Age: 11 to 18
- Enrolment: 1123
- Colours: Black, white and gold
- Former name: Evington Hall RC Girls' Grammar School
- Diocese: Nottingham
- Website: www.st-pauls.leicester.sch.uk

St. Paul's Catholic School is a coeducational Roman Catholic secondary school and sixth form located in Evington, Leicester, England. It is situated off the B667 road, just west of City of Leicester College and is part of the St Thomas Aquinas Catholic Multi-Academy Trust.

== History ==
The current site of St Paul's Catholic School on Spencefield Lane (B667) was formerly the site of Evington Hall Convent Grammar School, a girls' grammar school. St Paul's was founded in 1977 from the merger of Evington Hall and Corpus Christi, a local Catholic secondary modern school built in 1950 on Gwendolen Road which is now the site of a non-denominational Primary School since 1978. The current includes parts of the original Evington Hall building as well as several wings built over the years. The additions have made the school building roughly twice the size it was upon the school's foundation. The school celebrated its Silver Jubilee in 2002, with an open day for alumni, hosted by students and staff. In 2003, the school attained specialist Performing Arts College status.

In 1992 the original Evington Hall building became the site of Leicester Grammar Junior School, which it remained until 2008 when the Junior School moved to a shared site with Leicester Grammar School in Great Glen. In September 2011, the building became the Leicester Krishna Avanti Primary School, a Hindu free school, which continues to share the Spencefield Lane site with St Paul's.

In 2014 the school entered a phase of renovation which included the development of a new building including a theatre for performing arts. The site now comprises two separate buildings very close together and a car park to the rear of the main building. Previously a voluntary aided school, it became an academy and part of the St Thomas Aquinas Catholic Multi-Academy Trust in September 2018.

== Admissions ==
St. Paul's is one of two Catholic comprehensive schools in the Leicester area, the other being English Martyrs Catholic School. There are 1125 students on roll at St. Paul's, 180 of whom are sixth-formers. They are organised into years, with years 7 and 8 constituting key stage 3; years 9, 10 and 11 constituting key stage 4; and years 12 and 13 (A-Level years) constituting the "sixth form".

== Facilities ==
St Paul's is equipped with computer facilities, a learning plaza (the library) and a performing arts department which includes a recording studio, drama suites, dance suites and a theatre with a high stage, curtains and specialist lights. It was officially opened by Labour MPs Jim Knight (then-Minister of State for Schools) and Keith Vaz, MP for Leicester East. There is a Catholic chapel on the premises, which features a plaque blessed by Pope John Paul II.

It also features two hard-court areas, one with basketball posts and sports court with two full size football goals. There is a large grass field at the rear of the premises. All teaching rooms are well-equipped with resources and interactive whiteboards, with many having access to computers and laptops. There is a floor dedicated to science, and a specialist room for special educational needs interventions.

== Curriculum ==
St Paul's offers GCSE, A-Level and BTEC qualifications, as well as a mandatory PHSE programme.

== Academic results ==
St Paul's ranked in the top 10 secondary schools in the City and county for GCSE outcomes in 2024-25. Since the introduction of reformed GCSE exams in 2017, St Paul's has consistently had an above average number of students achieving a grade of 5 or higher in English and Mathematics compared to other state-funded schools in the City and County.

A-level results are in line with or above the average results for schools in the local authority, with the proportion of A* and A grades increasing in 2019.

== Staffing ==
The school is managed on a day-to-day basis by the senior leadership team consisting of a principal, two vice principals, three assistant principals, a business manager and a part time lay chaplain.

All curriculum subjects are led by a faculty leader, assistant faculty leader and sub-subject leaders (e.g. Biology Subject Leader). Years 7–11 are headed by a Head of Year (also referred to as a Progress Leader), and years 12 and 13 are headed by the Head of Sixth Form (role performed by an Assistant Principal), assisted by an Assistant Head of Sixth Form. There are also Assistant Head of Years and Student Support Officers to support pupils with a variety of issues. Altogether, St. Paul's employs over one hundred staff.

SEN provision include that of a specialist learning development team with particular responsibility for aiding pupils with additional needs, including higher level teaching assistants and teaching assistants being led by the special educational needs coordinator.

There have been six head teachers since 1977 Gerald O'Donnell was head from 1977 to 1990, followed by Edward Hayes until 2002. Deputy Headteacher, Roger Galvin, acted as head for one year until Francis Doherty was appointed in 2003. Dr Doherty was succeeded in 2011 by previous assistant headteacher Neil Lockyer, who went on to being the school's youngest headteacher before leaving in 2018 to take up the position of Chief Executive Officer of the school's new academy trust.

In 2018, Deputy Headteacher Marcella Gillespie was appointed as temporary headteacher but left after only one year in post following successful promotion to the academy trust executive team as Director of Safeguarding. In 2019 Shelley Conaghan was appointed as the new leader of the school as Principal (formerly known as Headteacher), after spending a number of years as Vice Principal and Assistant Principal at English Martyrs.

== Notable former pupils ==
=== Evington Hall Convent School ===
- Debbie Jarvis, sailor in the 1988 and 1992 Olympic Games
- Maggie Philbin, BBC science presenter.

=== St Paul's Catholic School ===
- Kirsty Linnett, former english professional footballer
- Chibuzor Chilaka, footballer for Matlock Town
- Remi Allen, footballer for Aston Villa W.F.C.
- Beryly Lubala, footballer for Blackpool F.C.
- Admiral Muskwe, footballer for Luton Town F.C.
- Adelaide Muskwe, Zimbabwean netball player
- Grace Petrie, singer-songwriter and guitarist
- Emmet Wan, footballer for Citizen AA in Hong Kong
- Jozsef Keaveny, former Irish footballer
