= Rock 'n' Roll Juvenile =

1979 studio album by Cliff Richard

Studio album by Cliff Richard
- Released: 7 September 1979
- Recorded: July 1978 – June 1979
- Genre: Pop; rock
- Label: EMI
- Producer: Terry Britten; Cliff Richard; Bruce Welch

Cliff Richard chronology
Thank You Very Much (1979)	Rock 'n' Roll Juvenile (1979)	I'm No Hero (1980)

Alternative cover
- US version of the album. Released as We Don't Talk Anymore

Professional ratings
Review scores
Source	Rating
AllMusic	4.5/5 stars
Smash Hits	3/10

Rock 'n' Roll Juvenile is the 22nd studio album by Cliff Richard, released in 1979. It features Richard's biggest-ever single, "We Don't Talk Anymore", which was a UK No. 1 hit (his first since 1968's "Congratulations" and his only one of the 1970s), and the No. 4 hit "Carrie".

== Background ==
Recording sessions for the album began on 18 July 1978, before Richard's previous album had been released. Over the next few days, the backing tracks of many of the songs were recorded, while the vocals weren't begun until January 1979 and continued on sporadically for the next few months, with the final vocal to be completed being for "Falling in Love" on 30 June 1979 (almost a year after the backing track). The final song to be considered for inclusion was "We Don't Talk Anymore", which had been recorded completely in one day in May 1979.

The album was produced largely by Terry Britten, a regular songwriter for Richard, but this was his first production work with him. Richard himself was named as co-producer, while "We Don't Talk Anymore" was credited to Bruce Welch, although this had also been heavily worked upon by Alan Tarney, the song's composer and Richard's future producer.

In July 1979, "We Don't Talk Anymore" was the first single to be released. Its fresh and contemporary pop sound made it an obvious choice and the public response was highly enthusiastic. The single quickly hit the number one spot in the UK singles chart, becoming Richard's first chart topper for more than a decade. It remained at the top for four weeks and became his biggest selling single in the UK, with sales just short of one million. It also became a big hit worldwide, including a top 10 entry on the US Billboard Hot 100. It eventually sold three million copies.

With the commercial disappointment of his previous studio album, Green Light, behind him, EMI released the new album in September 1979 and it was an immediate top 10 hit. The album reached No. 3 on the UK Albums Chart and remained on the chart for 21 weeks, making it his most successful studio album since the early 1960s. In the US, where it was released under the title We Don't Talk Anymore with a slightly different track listing, the album only managed to reach No. 93 on the Billboard 200.

A second single was released from the album in October, the less commercial "Hot Shot". This only managed to chart at No. 46 in the UK singles chart, but a third release, the poignant and haunting "Carrie" put Richard back into the UK top 10, reaching a high of No. 4 in March 1980. The latter single is one of his most highly regarded works, AllMusic calling it "one of the most electrifying of all Cliff Richard's recordings". It also became a hit in the US.

This album continued Richard's revival, which had begun in 1976 with the I'm Nearly Famous album and would now increase in strength for the next few years into the 1980s.

Rock 'n' Roll Juvenile was remastered and re-issued on compact disc in 2001 with bonus tracks.

== Track listing ==
=== Original UK release ===
Side one

1. "Monday Thru' Friday" (Terry Britten) – 3:47
2. "Doing Fine" (Britten) – 3:06
3. "Cities May Fall" (Britten, B.A. Robertson) – 4:17
4. "You Know that I Love You" (Britten) – 2:54
5. "My Luck Won't Change" (Britten, Robertson) – 4:13
6. "Rock 'n' Roll Juvenile" (Cliff Richard) – 2:47

Side two

1. "Sci-Fi" (Britten, Robertson) – 3:47
2. "Fallin' in Luv" (Britten, Robertson) – 3:11
3. "Carrie" (Britten, Robertson) – 3:43
4. "Hot Shot" (Britten, Robertson) – 3:23
5. "Language of Love" (Britten, Robertson) – 4:40
6. "We Don't Talk Anymore" (Alan Tarney) – 4:18

CD bonus tracks (2001 re-issue)

1. "Walking in the Light" (Britten) – 3:17
2. "Moving In" (Richard) – 3:26

=== Original North American release ===
This release was titled We Don't Talk Anymore and excluded "Cities May Fall" and "My Luck Won't Change".

Side one

1. "We Don't Talk Anymore" (Tarney) – 4:18
2. "Doing Fine" (Britten) – 3:06
3. "Monday Thru' Friday" (Britten) – 3:47
4. "You Know that I Love You" (Britten) – 2:54
5. "Rock 'n' Roll Juvenile" (Richard) – 2:47

Side two

1. "Sci-Fi" (Britten, Robertson) – 3:47
2. "Fallin' in Luv" (Britten, Robertson) – 3:11
3. "Carrie" (Britten, Robertson) – 3:43
4. "Hot Shot" (Britten, Robertson) – 3:23
5. "Language of Love" (Britten, Robertson) – 4:40

== Personnel ==
- Cliff Richard – vocals, guitar, backing vocals
- Terry Britten – guitar, Roland guitar synth, backing vocals
- Herbie Flowers – bass
- Graham Jarvis – drums, percussion, except "We Don't Talk Anymore"
- Billy Livsey, Graham Todd – keyboards
- Lance Dixon – synthesizer on "Monday Thru' Friday"
- Martin Dobson – saxophone on "Cities May Fall"
- Bryn Haworth – slide guitar on "Rock 'N' Roll Juvenile"
- Tristan Fry – percussion on "Carrie" and "Language of Love"
- Chris Mercer, Martin Drover, Mel Collins – brass on "My Luck Won't Change" and "Hot Shot"
- Peter Skellern – piano on "Language of Love"
- Alan Tarney – guitar, bass, keyboards, backing vocals on "We Don't Talk Anymore"
- John Perry, Stuart Calver, Tony Rivers, Madeline Bell – backing vocals
- Richard Hewson – strings arranged and conducted on "Sci-Fi" and "Language of Love"
- Trevor Spencer – drums on "We Don't Talk Anymore"
- Gered Mankowitz – photography

== Chart performance ==
Release date	Single title	UK Chart peak	US Chart peak	Australia	Ireland
July 1979	"We Don't Talk Anymore"	1	7	3	1
October 1979	"Hot Shot"	46	not released	not released	27
January 1980	"Carrie"	4	34	18	4
Release date	Album title	UK Chart peak	US Chart peak	Australia	
September 1979	Rock 'n' Roll Juvenile (We Don't Talk Anymore in US)	3	93	28	
