= Brown Sauce (band) =

1980s band made up of UK children's TV presenters

- Also known as: The Saucers
- Origin: United Kingdom
- Genre: Pop
- Instrument: Vocals
- Years active: 1981–1982
- Past members: Keith Chegwin; Maggie Philbin; Noel Edmonds

Brown Sauce was a pop band comprising Keith Chegwin, Maggie Philbin and Noel Edmonds, who at the time were, with John Craven, presenters of the television programme Multi-Coloured Swap Shop. They formed for a single in late 1981, "I Wanna Be a Winner", initially intended as a one-off. After that became a hit, they released another in 1982, "Spring Has Sprung", but failed to make an impact.

== Background ==
The trio had, with John Craven, been presenting the Saturday-morning programme Multi-Coloured Swap Shop together since 1978. In late 1981 they decided to release a single as a novelty one-off. The A-side song "I Wanna Be a Winner" was written by B. A. Robertson and became a surprise hit, reaching No. 15 in the UK Singles Chart in January 1982. The song remained on the UK chart for 12 weeks. The group also recorded a video. The song referenced many famous names of the time such as Diana, Princess of Wales, Frank Bough, Barbara Woodhouse and Kevin Keegan. The song was mainly performed by Chegwin and Philbin, who jointly shared lead vocals. Neither Philbin nor Edmonds had any musical background, but Chegwin had performed in bands in the early 1970s. The video depicted Chegwin and Philbin playing guitars and Edmonds playing drums, although they did not play these instruments on the recording.

The B-side of the single was "Hello Hello", the theme music of the TV programme's final series. Due to the success of the single, a follow-up was released, "Spring Has Sprung" in March 1982, under a new name, The Saucers, this time without Edmonds. It failed to chart highly and the group went no further. In the same month, the TV show ended, with Chegwin and Philbin performing "Spring Has Sprung" on the last edition.

== Discography ==
=== Singles ===
- "I Wanna Be a Winner" - December 1981 (UK #15) BBC Records
- "Spring Has Sprung" - March 1982 BBC Records
