= Debbie Jarvis =

British sailor (born 1964)

Personal information
- Nationality: British
- Born: 16 January 1964 (age 62) Leicester, England

Sport
- Sport: Sailing

Debbie Jarvis (born 16 January 1964) is a British sailor. She competed at the 1988 Summer Olympics and the 1992 Summer Olympics.

== Early life ==
She grew up on Woodside Road, in Oadby in Leicestershire. She attended Evington Hall Convent Grammar School and Wyggeston 6th Form.

In 1988 she lived in Gilmorton, working as a soft drinks sales rep.
