= Cheggers Party Quiz =

2007 video game

- Developer: Oxygen Games
- Publisher: Oxygen Games
- Platform: PlayStation 2, Microsoft Windows, Wii
- Release: PlayStation 2, Microsoft Windows; EU: 26 October 2007; Wii; EU: 7 December 2007
- Genre: Party
- Mode: Multiplayer

Cheggers Party Quiz is a quiz video game developed by Oxygen Games, featuring the TV personality Keith Chegwin as a host. The game was released for the PlayStation 2 and Microsoft Windows on 26 October 2007, and on the Nintendo Wii on 7 December 2007.

The game received negative reviews from players and critics.

== Gameplay ==
Cheggers Party Quiz is a party quiz game where players compete against each other to answer questions correctly in a series of rounds. Keith Chegwin appears as the host in CGI form, giving updates on which players are in the lead and interjecting with one-liners. The game features a selection of thousands of questions for players to answer.

The questions are based on television shows, film and music from up to two decades before the game's release date. A total of 8 round types are included, titled "Opening Night", "Big Break", "Picture Show", "Star Turn", "Prime Time", "Typecast", "Channel Hopping" and "Final Cut". Round types include a slow reveal round where question marks slowly turn into letters or the "channel hopping" round where each player's answers are briefly revealed and everyone has a chance to change their answer. There are also rounds where the fastest player to buzz in can answer and another where the answer must be guessed from picture clues. Players can customize the game length but cannot pick specific round types.

Whereas the PlayStation 2 version uses the DualShock controller and an "L1" button press to buzz in, the Wii version utilises the motion sensitive Wii Remote, requiring players to lift their hand and the remote in the air as fast as they can.

== Development ==
During an interview, Keith Chegwin stated that he had recorded over 900 separate voice overs and that the process was more ad-libbed than strictly scripted.

Alan Hansen's Sports Challenge was developed concurrently with Cheggers Party Quiz and both games were released in tandem on the same dates.

== Reception ==
Jon Blyth at PC Zone rated the game 10/100, calling it a "bottom-feeding attempt to draw nourishment from the Chegwin name."

Ellie Gibson at Eurogamer gave the game a 6/10, saying that "you're better off investing in Buzz!".
