= Small Corners =

1978 studio album by Cliff Richard

Studio album by Cliff Richard
- Released: March 1978
- Recorded: January 1977
- Genre: CCM, gospel, pop, rock
- Label: EMI
- Producer: Cliff Richard

Cliff Richard chronology
40 Golden Greats (1977)	Small Corners (1978)	Green Light (1978)

Singles from Small Corners
- 1. "Yes He Lives" Released: 27 January 1978

Small Corners is a 1978 album of Contemporary Christian music by British singer Cliff Richard. It is his twentieth studio album and third gospel album. It was recorded in Abbey Road Studios in January 1977.

"Yes He Lives" was released in the UK as the lead single from the album, but did not chart. In France, "Why Should the Devil Have All the Good Music" was released as a single in April 1978, however it did not chart either. A significant portion of the album consists of songs by American writers, including Larry Norman, Annie Herring, Kris Kristofferson and Randy Stonehill.

This album has never been released in the US.

== Critical response ==
AllMusic found that due to its "spontaneous air" it was more fun and less "pious" than his other religious recordings. On its reissue, Mojo magazine gave it 3/5.

== Track listing ==
Side one
No.	Title	Writer(s)	Length
1.	"Why Should the Devil Have All the Good Music"	Larry Norman	4:05
2.	"I Love"	Alwyn Wall, Malcolm Wild	3:15
3.	"Why Me"	Kris Kristofferson	2:40
4.	"I've Got News for You"	Randy Stonehill	4:14
5.	"Hey Watcha' Say"	Annie Herring, Matthew Ward	3:56
6.	"I Wish We'd All Been Ready"	Larry Norman	4:38

Side two
No.	Title	Writer(s)	Length
1.	"Joseph"	Terry Britten	3:22
2.	"Good On the Sally Army"	Allan Shiers	3:04
3.	"Going Home"	Annie Herring	2:51
4.	"Up In Canada"	Larry Norman	2:44
5.	"Yes He Lives"	Terry Britten	3:28
6.	"When I Survey the Wondrous Cross"	Traditional; Isaac Watts, Edward Miller; Norrie Paramor	2:11

== Personnel ==
According to the album's liner notes.

- Cliff Richard – lead vocals
- Terry Britten, Bryn Haworth – guitar
- Alan Tarney – bass guitar
- Graham Todd – keyboards
- Brian Bennett – drums and percussion
- Tony Rivers, John Perry, Stuart Calver, Cliff Richard – vocal group
- Nick Ingman – string arrangement

=== Technical personnel ===
- Cliff Richard – producer
- Tony Clark – engineer
- Hayden Bendall, John Barret, Mike Jarrett, Allan Rouse – assistant engineers
- Chris Blair, Nick Webb – mastering
- Gered Mankowitz – photography
