= Green Light (Cliff Richard album) =

1978 studio album by Cliff Richard

Studio album by Cliff Richard
- Released: 29 September 1978
- Recorded: July 1977, January - April 1978
- Genre: Pop, rock
- Label: EMI, Rocket (US)
- Producer: Bruce Welch

Cliff Richard chronology
Small Corners (1978)	Green Light (1978)	Thank You Very Much (1979)

Singles from Green Light
- 1. "Please Remember Me" Released: 28 July 1978; 2. "Can't Take the Hurt Anymore" Released: 3 November 1978; 3. "Green Light" Released: 16 February 1979

Professional ratings
Review scores
Source	Rating
Allmusic	3/5 stars

Green Light is the 21st studio album by Cliff Richard, released in September 1978.

Richard had seen a dip in popularity in the early 1970s until his 1976 album I'm Nearly Famous gave him major success. This comeback kept him regularly in the charts until the mid-1980s. Of this period's release, only the 1978 Small Corners gospel album and Green Light failed to make the top ten. The latter, with full commercial expectations, was a particular disappointment, only reaching No.25 in the album chart and lacking any hit singles. These included "Please Remember Me" and "Can't Take the Hurt Anymore". This was the second year since 1958 that this had happened. A third and final release, the title track "Green Light" gave him a chart entry, but it crept only to No.57.

Despite the commercial failure, Green Light was well received by critics. Allmusic said it is "Richard at his most commercial and appealing and deserved to be more widely heard - particularly in the US". Probably the most well-known song on the album is "Count Me Out", which was later released as the B-side to his 1979 single "We Don't Talk Anymore", the song that revived his career by selling more than any other. Another ballad, "Never Even Thought" whose orchestration builds to a dramatic crescendo, was first released by Murray Head in 1975 on his album Say It Ain't So and also covered by Colin Blunstone in 1978. He later added new instrumentation for his remix album My Kinda Life in 1992.

Since his 1977 Every Face Tells a Story album, Richard had released two more - a Christian music album, Small Corners and a compilation album 40 Golden Greats, which had reached No.1 in November 1977. Soon after this, he also released a live album, Thank You Very Much, which celebrated 20 years of him and The Shadows in the music business.

The title track was covered in 1979 by Yvonne Elliman on her album Yvonne. His album was remastered and reissued on compact disc in July 2002.

== Track listing ==
Side one
No.	Title	Writer(s)	Length
1.	"Green Light"	Alan Tarney	4:05
2.	"Under Lock and Key"	Terry Britten	3:34
3.	"She's a Gipsy"	John D. Bryant, Terry Dempsey	4:14
4.	"Count Me Out"	Terry Britten, Bruce Welch	4:15
5.	"Please Remember Me"	Dave Loggins, Bruce Woodley	3:20
6.	"Never Even Thought"	Murray Head	4:16

Side two
No.	Title	Writer(s)	Length
1.	"Free My Soul"	Terry Britten	3:56
2.	"Start All Over Again"	Terry Britten, B.A. Robertson	4:02
3.	"While She's Young"	Terry Britten	2:50
4.	"Can't Take the Hurt Anymore"	Laurie Andrew	3:52
5.	"Ease Along"	Trevor Spencer, Alan Tarney	4:29

NOTE: In 1981, this album was re-issued in the USA by EMI America and in Canada by Capitol. That re-issue omitted "Never Even Thought".

Bonus tracks (2002 re-issue)
No.	Title	Writer(s)	Length
12.	"Please Don't Tease"	Peter Chester, Bruce Welch	4:47
13.	"Needing a Friend"	Cliff Richard, Gary Isherwood	2:57
14.	"Imagine Love"	Petrina Lordan, Alan Tarney	4:20

== Personnel ==
- Cliff Richard - vocals
- Alan Tarney - guitar, bass, keyboards and backing vocals
- Alan Parker, Terry Britten and Tim Renwick - guitar
- Alan Jones - bass
- Duncan Mackay and Graham Todd - keyboards
- Brian Bennett and Trevor Spencer - drums
- John Perry, Stuart Calver and Tony Rivers - backing vocals
- Richard Hewson - string arrangement
- Gered Mankowitz - photography

== Chart history ==
Release date	Single title	UK Chart peak
28 July 1978	"Please Remember Me"	-
3 November 1978	"Can't Take the Hurt Anymore"	-
16 February 1979	"Green Light"	57
Release date	Album title	UK Chart peak
29 September 1978	Green Light	25
