= TeenTech =

UK not-for-profit organisation

TeenTech is a not-for-profit Charity and Community Interest Company founded in 2008 by Maggie Philbin and Chris Dodson to help young people understand the real opportunities available in the contemporary STEM (Science, Technology, Engineering and Maths) workplace and engender some excitement about technology and entrepreneurship.

In 2010 TeenTech won the Best Engineering Event in National Science and Engineering Week award and in 2011 was the only UK organisation to receive a Google RISE award. In 2012, CEO Maggie Philbin and TeenTech also won Best Communication and Outreach Award presented by UKRC/WISE (Women in Science and Engineering). In 2016 Maggie was announced as Digital Leader of the Year, and Most Influential Woman in UK IT for her work with TeenTech

== TeenTech Events ==
TeenTech runs regular events at venues across the UK, also in the Republic of Ireland. At each event around 300 pupils from 30 different schools attend and are shown hands-on exhibits and challenges run by companies, universities and business organisations.

The events aim to help young people see the wide range of career possibilities in science, engineering and technology and works with technology based industry to provide hands on experience for school students.

== UK Digital Skills Taskforce ==
Through Young Digital Taskforce, TeenTech encourages young people to input into the UK Digital Skills report which aims to address the disconnect between contemporary industry and their potential workforce. The steering group has members from across industry and education and a young persons advisory group (students, apprentices and young people seeking work) who will inform thinking and shape the approach.

An interim report Digital Skills for Tomorrow’s World was delivered in July 2014.
