= Just Good Friends (song) =

Song by Michael Jackson and Stevie Wonder

from the album Bad
- Released: August 31, 1987
- Recorded: September 1986
- Studio: Westlake
- Genre: Synth-funk; R&B; pop
- Length: 4:06
- Label: Epic
- Songwriters: Terry Britten; Graham Lyle
- Producers: Quincy Jones; Michael Jackson (co.)

"Just Good Friends" is a song from American recording artist Michael Jackson's 1987 album Bad. The song is one of two duets on the album, the other being "I Just Can't Stop Loving You". The song features Jackson and Stevie Wonder quarrelling over a girl in a light, cheerful manner. "Just Good Friends" is the fifth track on Bad with a duration of 4:06. Despite the presence of Wonder, the song was never released as a single. "Just Good Friends" is one of only two songs on Bad which were not written by Jackson himself, the other being "Man in the Mirror". The song was written and composed by the '80s songwriting partnership of Terry Britten and Graham Lyle.

== Reception ==
Richard Cromelin of the Los Angeles Times liked what he called a relaxed and charming nature of Jackson and Wonder's vocal performances in the duet. He noted the song's "early Jackson 5 charge" and Motown links. He was impressed with both "Just Good Friends" and "Man in the Mirror" and thought they stood out in comparison to other tracks from Bad. On the other hand, Rolling Stone criticized "Just Good Friends" as being "the only mediocrity" on Bad. The reviewer attributed this to the fact that "Just Good Friends" is one of only two songs not written by Jackson on the album. Rolling Stone commented that the Stevie Wonder-duet starts well, but "devolves into a chin-bobbing cheerfulness that is unforced but also, sadly, unearned." Quincy Jones was also very critical of the song: "I made a mistake on the duet with him and Stevie ["Just Good Friends", written by Terry Britten and Graham Lyle]. That didn't work."

Musicians often admire parts of the song, yet many critics feel it never quite fulfilled the potential suggested by the pairing of the two artists. Several other potential duets with Prince, Whitney Houston and Barbra Streisand all failed to materialize. Jackson and Wonder both contribute a song to each other’s albums, with Jackson singing "Get It" on Characters.

== Personnel ==
- Written and composed by Terry Britten and Graham Lyle
- Vocal duet with Michael Jackson and Stevie Wonder
- Synthesizer solo: Stevie Wonder
- Drums: Ollie E. Brown, Humberto Gatica and Bruce Swedien
- Drum programming: Cornelius Mims
- Rhythm guitar and wah-wah guitar solo: Michael Landau
- Saxophones: Kim Hutchcroft and Larry Williams
- Trumpets: Gary Grant and Jerry Hey
- Percussion: Paulinho Da Costa
- Synclavier: Christopher Currell
- Synthesizers: Michael Boddicker, Rhett Lawrence, Greg Phillinganes and Larry Williams
- Rhythm, synthesizer and vocal arrangements by Terry Britten, Graham Lyle and Quincy Jones
- Horn arrangement by Jerry Hey

== See also ==
- "The Girl Is Mine" – a 1982 song by Michael Jackson and Paul McCartney with similar subject matter
