= Knocked It Off =

1979 single by BA Robertson

Single by BA Robertson

from the album Initial Success
- B-side: "Sci Fi"
- Released: October 1979
- Studio: Mayfair Studios, London
- Genre: New wave
- Length: 3:24
- Label: Asylum
- Songwriters: BA Robertson; Terry Britten
- Producer: Terry Britten

BA Robertson singles chronology
"Bang Bang" (1979)	"Knocked It Off" (1979)	"Kool in the Kaftan" (1980)

"Knocked It Off" is a song by Scottish musician BA Robertson, released in October 1979 as the third single from his third album Initial Success. It became his second Top-Ten hit in the UK, peaking at number 8 on the Singles Chart. The song features a sarangi by Neil Sorrell. The title "Knocked It Off" means, in this context, to become a success somewhat unexpectedly. The lyrics criticise celebrity life, making references to pop and football fame.

== Reception ==
Reviewing the song for Record Mirror, Robin Smith wrote "The Bruce Forsyth of rock 'n' roll has done it again. This single is so annoying because it's full of some of the most ridiculous lyrics ever committed to paper. But it's so well crafted and stuck to that infectious tacky back beat that it's guaranteed to evade your ears. The only safe place to be will be the outer Hebrides".

== Charts ==
Chart (1979)	Peak position
Ireland (IRMA)	8
UK Singles (OCC)	8
