= Wringing Applause =

Studio album by BA Robertson
- Released: July 1973
- Studio: Morgan, London; Ardent, Memphis
- Genre: Art rock; soft rock
- Length: 44:02
- Label: Ardent
- Producer: Georg Kajanus

BA Robertson chronology
Wringing Applause (1973)	Shadow of a Thin Man (1976)

Wringing Applause is the debut studio album by Scottish musician BA Robertson, released in July 1973 by Ardent Records. Credited as Brian Alexander Robertson, the album features original songs by Robertson, arranged in an art rock style, and was produced by Georg Kajanus.

== Background ==
Before making the album, BA Robertson travelled to London and decided to write his own songs, as he felt dissatisfied with the experience of playing cover songs and supported himself in varying jobs, such as running a food van. Robertson also had difficulties attracting the attention of record companies and music publishers. When Robertson met another musician Georg Kajanus, they made demos of Robertson's songs; With the demos ready, they were able to secure a deal with American record company Ardent Records for Robertson, who opted to be credited as Brian Alexander Robertson. They booked a session at Morgan Studios, where Kajanus then assumed production for Robertson's album Wringing Applause as producer and arranger (director), while Terry Manning engineered the album.

Wringing Applause is an art rock and soft rock album featuring songs written and sung by Robertson. The album often features theatrical elements, both in musical arrangement and in the lyrical contents, and was described as a "song cycle" or a "rock opera" about performers, by varying outlets. It is also one of Robertson's earliest collaborations with session musician Herbie Flowers, who played the electric bass and double bass for the album.

== Release and critical reception ==
Professional ratings
Review scores
Source	Rating
The Encyclopedia of Popular Music	2/5 stars

Wringing Applause was released only in the United States in July 1973 by Ardent Records. The album attracted considerable attention at the time, with one review from Cashbox magazine comparing Robertson's musicianship to that of David Bowie's and proclaiming it "a delightful journey". Record World stated in an August 1973 review of the album that he "sings well and writes intelligently in his story about the rock life." Despite the positive reception, the album did not chart.

In Robertson's home country Scotland, and the United Kingdom, the album was written off as "a massively overblown soft rock extravaganza with pretentions to operatic grandeur", as David Hepworth wrote for Smash Hits magazine. Despite this, Hepworth highlighted Robertson's lyrics and its "blockbuster production" in the album favourably.

Attempts to get Wringing Applause reissued were made. In the 2000s, BA Robertson approached Stax Records for a possible reissue of the album for compact disc: The label informed Robertson that the master tapes had been destroyed. Wringing Applause has no reissues; The reputation of the album has grown to be an obscure fascination among critics and writers. In a retrospective review from Isthmus, Bob Koch highlights Robertson's "wry, sideways sense of humor" as his strongest characteristic in the album, comparing it to that of Randy Newman's. Music writer Colin Larkin alleged that the album was accompanied by "excessive hype", and gave the album two out of five stars.

== Track listing ==
All songs written by Brian Alexander Robertson.

Side one
No.	Title	Length
1.	"Moira's Hand"	3:30
2.	"In the Limelight"	3:59
3.	"These Fantasies"	3:51
4.	"After the Theatre"	4:57
5.	"Carnival"	5:05
Total length:		21:22

Side two
No.	Title	Length
1.	"Cowboys"	4:22
2.	"To My Star"	5:29
3.	"Coatails"	4:14
4.	"Baby Nuts"	4:12
5.	"Myths and Illusions"	4:23
Total length:		22:41

== Personnel ==
Personnel per Ardent Records and AllMusic.

Musicians

- BA Robertson – lead vocals, piano
- Herbie Flowers – electric bass, upright bass
- Barry Morgan – drums, percussions
- Stephen Saunders – euphonium
- Paul Beer – euphonium
- Miss Alison J. – piano

Production

- Georg Kajanus – producer, director
- Robin Black – recording engineer (Morgan Studios, London)
- Terry Manning – recording engineer (Ardent Studios, Memphis)
- Richard Rosebrough – recording engineer (Ardent Studios, Memphis)
- Carole Manning – art direction
