= The Gospel Truth Choir =

- Origin: Scotland
- Genres: Vocal, Gospel
- Years active: 2007 - now
- Labels: M2M2
- Members: Tracey Braithwaite (Director) and up to 40 vocalists
- Website: Official site

The Gospel Truth Choir is a Scottish choir which performs a wide variety of music in a gospel style. Originally formed by Tracey Braithwaite and a group of friends in 2007 for the wedding of BAFTA-winning composer Paul Leonard-Morgan, they were soon regularly performing in recording studios and on stage, as well as being a feature of many wedding ceremonies.

== Career ==
The Gospel Truth Choir first came to wider public attention when they were asked by Scots songwriter B.A. Robertson to perform vocals on the 2008 version of his football anthem "We Have a Dream", which became the charity single for the BBC Scotland Children in Need campaign. The recording featured a number of celebrities, including Samuel L. Jackson, Ashley Jensen, Dougray Scott, Billy Boyd, Chris Hoy, Ally McCoist, Fred MacAulay, Karen Dunbar, Elaine C Smith and John Gordon Sinclair, who were all featured on a part live / part-recorded version alongside B.A. Robertson and Edwyn Collins on the live BBC Scotland Children in Need show.

Following the BBC appearance, B.A. Robertson invited the choir to join him at Abbey Road Studios, where they recorded backing vocals on a number of tracks written by the Glaswegian songwriter, including "The Living Years", marking the start of an ongoing relationship between choir and songwriter.

2009 saw the choir contribute vocals to two tracks on the debut album of Codeine Velvet Club, a Glasgow band featuring Jon Lawler of The Fratellis. This album was released in the UK in 2009 and the US in 2010. In late 2009 the choir joined The Skids onstage during their performance at "Homecoming Live", a celebration of Scottish music held at the SECC in Glasgow to celebrate the end of Scotland's year of homecoming.

In January 2010 the choir made a number of appearances around the Celtic Connections festival. Most notably, they contributed to "A Scottish Songbook", a concert at Glasgow's Royal Concert Hall which featured a number of acts performing songs by Scots songwriters. As well as reprising "The Living Years" with B.A. Robertson, the choir sang with Ricky Ross, Lorraine McIntosh, Karine Polwart, Siobhan Boyle and Maeve Mackinnon, to a sell-out audience of 2500 people. Later in the festival the choir performed a full concert with Glasgow artist Horse McDonald at City Halls.

February 2010 saw the choir join Paul Carrack on stage at Glasgow's Royal Concert Hall to perform on his version of "The Living Years". Later the same month, the group appeared live on STV's news magazine show The Hour performing a version of Amazing Grace. In March, members of the choir rejoined The Skids for two sold-out shows in Glasgow and Dunfermline.

In October 2010 the choir released their debut album, Deep Fried Gospel, a selection of gospel covers of well-known songs by Scottish songwriters and including contributions from Maeve MacKinnon, Horse McDonald, Bruce Watson, Mary Ann Kennedy and the combined choirs of Lothian and Borders Police and InChorus. Later that month members of the choir joined members of The Skids once more for a short acoustic gig ahead of the launch of a DVD featuring live performances from earlier in the year. They were also announced as participants in the 2010 BBC Scotland Children in Need lineup, where they performed a track from their album alongside cast members of River City.

The choir again took part in Celtic Connections in January 2011, this time sharing the bill with Tom Jones in a gospel-themed evening. February 2011 saw them join Jill Jackson at the launch of her new album Back to Zero at The Ferry in Glasgow, closely followed by a week-long residency as the "house choir" on the Breakfast Show on 102.5 Clyde 1 singing live jingles and performing with a number of guests. In June 2011 the choir joined a gig organised by the Scottish Charity Cash for Kids, and performed with Marti Pellow, and in August made their first trip to Russia as guests of the St Andrews Society to perform with Ricky Ross. On 18 November 2011 the choir joined forces with BBC Scotland Talent, including Jackie Bird, to perform a version of "Lean on Me" during a record-breaking evening of fundraising for BBC Children in Need

The choir launched their second album, Live from Grand Central, with a performance at the Grand Central Hotel in Glasgow on 20 November 2011. The album was recorded at their previous outing at that venue. The launch gig featured guest appearances by Alan Nimmo and Fraser Speirs, and a performance with Ricky Ross of "(When Will You Make) My Telephone Ring". In late November they switched on the Christmas lights in Ayr and Broughty Ferry.

In early 2012 the choir launched an amateur version called The Gospel Truth Community Choir, with the intention of building a Scottish Gospel Choir.

== Discography ==
"We Have a Dream" - Pudsey's Beautiful Dreamers (2008)

"The Living Years" - B.A. Robertson (2009)

Codeine Velvet Club - Codeine Velvet Club (2009) on "Time" and "The Black Roses"

Deep Fried Gospel - The Gospel Truth Choir (2010)

Live from Grand Central - The Gospel Truth Choir (2011)

== Personnel ==
The Gospel Truth Choir was founded by Tracey Braithwaite, formerly a backing vocalist with Horse McDonald and KT Tunstall. The choir draws from a large pool of professional and semi-pro singers in Scotland, many of whom have their own musical careers.
