= Carrie (Cliff Richard song) =

1979 single by Cliff Richard

- Cover sleeve of the UK release

Single by Cliff Richard

from the album Rock 'n' Roll Juvenile
- B-side: "Moving In"; "Language of Love" (US release)
- Released: 1 December 1979
- Recorded: 7–12 January & 2 February 1979
- Studio: Pathé-Marconi, Paris; Abbey Road, London
- Genre: Pop rock; soft rock; new wave
- Length: 3:28 (edit); 3:42 (album version)
- Label: EMI
- Songwriters: Terry Britten; BA Robertson
- Producers: Terry Britten; Cliff Richard

Cliff Richard singles chronology
"Hot Shot" (1979)	"Carrie" (1979)	"Dreamin'" (1980)

Cliff Richard (US/Europe/Australia) singles chronology
"We Don't Talk Anymore" (1979)	"Carrie" (1979)	"Dreamin'" (1980)

Music video
- "Carrie" on YouTube

Alternative cover
- Cover sleeve of the German release

"Carrie" is a song performed by Cliff Richard and released in December 1979 as the third single lifted from Richard's album Rock 'n' Roll Juvenile. It reached number 4 in the UK Singles Chart and became an international hit.

== Composition ==
"Carrie" was written by the songwriting partnership of Terry Britten and BA Robertson, who had written Richard previous single "Hot Shot" and who also wrote several other songs for Rock 'n' Roll Juvenile. Britten initially came up with the riff and the title, but he "realized that it would take someone who knew what they were doing to make it into a proper song", so he got Robertson to come up with the story. Speaking about the song, Robertson has said:

"The strength of the song comes from the fact that you're never quite sure what it's about. You don't know whether Carrie is homeless or whether she's squatting or what. You don't know whether Cliff, as the narrator, is the husband, boyfriend, lover, brother or father. Nowhere does the song say what the relationship with Carrie is. It's very mysterious and musically it falls in the same groove as 'I Heard It Through The Grapevine'".

== Recording and release ==
The backing track was recorded between 7 and 12 January 1979 at the EMI Pathé-Marconi Studios in Paris and the vocals were later recorded at Abbey Road Studios in London on 2 February. The recording engineers were Tony Clark and Haydn Bendall.

"Carrie" was released in the majority of territories with the B-side "Moving In", which was written and produced by Richard. It was first released as a single in the Netherlands and Germany at the beginning of December 1979, before being released in Australia on 12 December with the B-side "Walking in the Light", written by Britten. "Carrie" was later re-released in Australia in March 1980 with "Moving In" as the B-side. In the UK, the single was released on 18 January 1980.

The single release of "Carrie" is an edit of the album version and also actually runs slightly faster. However, the album version was released on the original Australian single and the US and Canadian single. The latter was also released with a different B-side, "Language of Love", also written by Britten and Robertson, in February 1980.

== Reception ==
Reviewing for Record Mirror, Simon Ludgate gave it 'Single of the Week', writing that "it's astounding, the hits keep rolling off 'Rock 'n' Roll Juvenile', from which this is taken. To be producing high-pop songs like this after 25 years in the Biz is extraordinary", adding that Richard's "delivery is immaculate and his timing superb. You can't ignore a classic popstar: credit must be given".

In a retrospective review for AllMusic, Dave Thompson described the song as "a deliberately sinister and enthrallingly atmospheric number, revolving around the search for a mysteriously missing friend ("Carrie had a date with her own kind of fate")" and that "in other hands, such lines as "you're just another message on a payphone wall" and "the young wear their freedom like cheap perfume" could sound trite. Richard imbibes them with both pertinence and importance, while the emotion in his voice colors even the title.

== Track listing ==
7": EMI / EMI 5006

1. "Carrie" – 3:28
2. "Moving In" – 3:26

7": EMI / EMI-168 (Australia)

1. "Carrie" – 3:42
2. "Walking in the Light" – 3:08

7": EMI / 8035 (US and Canada)

1. "Carrie" – 3:42
2. "Language of Love" – 4:39

== Personnel ==
- Cliff Richard – vocals, backing vocals
- Terry Britten – guitar, backing vocals
- Herbie Flowers – bass
- Graham Jarvis – drums
- Billy Livsey – keyboards
- Tristan Fry – percussion
- Mel Collins – saxophone

== Charts and certifications ==
=== Weekly charts ===
Chart (1980)	Peak position
Australia (Kent Music Report)	18
Belgium (Ultratop 50 Flanders)	26
Canada Top Singles (RPM)	89
Germany (GfK)	26
Ireland (IRMA)	4
Netherlands (Dutch Top 40)	29
Netherlands (Single Top 100)	29
New Zealand (Recorded Music NZ)	8
South Africa (Springbok Radio)	5
UK Singles (Official Charts)	4
US Billboard Hot 100	34
US Cash Box Top 100	39

=== Year-end charts ===
Chart (1980)	Rank
Australia (Kent Music Report)	142
UK Singles (OCC)	72

=== Certifications ===
Region	Certification	Certified units/sales
United Kingdom (BPI)	Silver	250,000^{^}
^{^} Shipments figures based on certification alone.

== Cover versions ==
- In the same week in May 1980 that Richard's version peaked in Canada, a cover by Canadian progressive rock band CANO reached a higher peak at number 78.
