= Multi-Coloured Swap Shop =

BBC children's TV series (1976–1982)

- Genre: Children's
- Presented by: Noel Edmonds; Keith Chegwin; John Craven; Maggie Philbin (series 3–6)
- Theme music composer: Mike Batt (series 1–5); BA Robertson (series 6)
- Country of origin: United Kingdom
- Original language: English
- No. of series: 6
- No. of episodes: 146

Production
- Production location: BBC Television Centre
- Running time: 150–180 minutes

Original release
- Network: BBC One
- Release: 2 October 1976 – 27 March 1982

Multi-Coloured Swap Shop, more commonly known simply as Swap Shop, is a British children's television series that aired on BBC1 from 2 October 1976 to 27 March 1982. The show was presented by Noel Edmonds, Keith Chegwin, John Craven and, from 1978, Maggie Philbin. It was groundbreaking in many ways: by broadcasting live on Saturday mornings, being three hours in length, and using a direct telephone number extensively for the first time on TV.

The concept of the show revolved around children being able to call the telephone number and "swap" any item of theirs with something owned by another viewer of the show, anything from toys to full collections of memorabilia. Additionally, outside broadcasts fronted by Chegwin called "the Swaporama" allowed children to attend events to physically swap their items in-person. The show also featured celebrity interviews, music performances and competitions. Craven contributed news updates similar in vein to his programme Newsround. Edmonds, Chegwin and Philbin briefly formed a pop group called Brown Sauce in December 1981 and released a single called "I Wanna be a Winner". The song peaked at number 15 in the UK Singles Chart and stayed in the Top 40 for a total of nine weeks.

The show rivalled the growing success of rival broadcaster ITV's Tiswas, though the latter was initially only broadcast in the ATV region in the Midlands and, at the time of Swap Shop's inception, had yet to be taken up by other ITV franchises around the country. It set a trend for future children's programmes broadcast in an identical timeslot on the BBC, including Saturday Superstore, Going Live!, Live and Kicking, Dick & Dom in da Bungalow and Saturday Mash-Up!. The majority of episodes are currently missing from the BBC archive.

The programme was revived in 2008 on CBBC as Basil's Swap Shop, presented by Basil Brush and Barney Harwood.

== History ==
The telephone number for the show from the second series onward was 01 811 8055.

Swap Shop was so popular that during its run four annuals were published. Swap Shop was a success, attracting substantial ratings not only among its target audience of children, but also students and parents. It ended in 1982, to allow the presenters to move on to other projects, notably Edmonds, who became one of the highest-profile TV presenters in the UK.

Spin-off programmes were created to widen the appeal of Multi-Coloured Swap Shop:

- On Boxing Day 1976, Swap of the Pops was broadcast on BBC1, featuring pre-recorded performances by pop acts of the era, linked by Noel Edmonds.
- The first Swap Shop Star Awards were shown in March 1978, in which special awards ('Erics') were given to sportspeople, actors and other celebrities, as voted for by viewers of Multi-Coloured Swap Shop. The programme returned for subsequent editions in 1979, 1980, 1981 and 1982.
- A live outside broadcast, Noel Edmonds presents Multi-Coloured Swap Shop's Rock Garden Party, was shown in May 1978 with Edmonds presenting numerous musical acts performing at the Jubilee Gardens on London's South Bank.
- The Multi Coloured Music Show was shown on BBC1 on 26 May 1979, a programme similar to Swap of the Pops where Edmonds introduced some of the most popular music from the previous series of Swap Shop.

Swap Shop is poorly represented in the BBC archive. For some time it was believed that either the programmes were never routinely recorded in the first place, or they had been wiped on the orders of the BBC's Archive Selector Adam Lee in 1993. The truth, as related by ex-Blue Peter editor Richard Marson on the archive television forum The Mausoleum Club in 2006, is that almost every edition of Swap Shop was recorded in full every week onto two 90-minute Quad tapes. These tapes were held by the BBC until the late 1980s, at which time the Deputy Head of Children's Television, Roy Thompson, allowed many of them to be wiped and sold to Australia as recycled stock. Although Quad tape was considered obsolete in the UK, Australia was still using it extensively at that time, and as the Swap Shop tapes had no physical splices in them, they were considered ideal for reuse.

As a consequence of this action, many of the clips used in the retrospective It Started With Swap Shop and as extras on some DVD releases of other BBC shows had to be taken from domestic video recordings that had survived in private hands. Amongst the editions wiped were those featuring appearances by Blondie, XTC, Trumpton creator Gordon Murray, and numerous cast and crew members of Doctor Who.

== It Started With Swap Shop ==
It Started With Swap Shop was a special programme celebrating the 30th anniversary of BBC children's Saturday morning shows, recorded in TC3 at Television Centre on 15 December 2006 and broadcast on BBC Two on 28 December 2006. It was made by Edmonds' production company Unique Television.

In the two-hour long programme, Edmonds, Chegwin, Craven and Philbin reunited to discuss their memories of their time presenting Swap Shop, archival clips were shown, and members of the public who appeared on Swap Shop as children were invited back to be part of the studio audience. Along with celebrating Swap Shop, the show looked back on the history of the follow-up Saturday morning shows Saturday Superstore, Going Live! and Live and Kicking.

Contributors included Johnny Ball, Nicki Chapman (music promoter for artists appearing on Saturday morning shows), Lenny Henry (presenter of rival show Tiswas), Saturday Superstore presenter Mike Read, Michael Crawford, Arlene Phillips, Trevor and Simon, Chris Moyles, Andi Peters and Emma Forbes of Live and Kicking, and Fearne Cotton of The Saturday Show.

Phillip Schofield and Sarah Greene of Going Live! appeared in a specially recorded sketch, with Laurence Llewelyn-Bowen making a cameo appearance in a Trevor and Simon studio sketch. Dame Edna Everage, Delia Smith and Cliff Richard contributed over the phone.

== Transmissions ==
| Series | Start date | End date | Episodes |
|---|---|---|---|
| 1 | 2 October 1976 | 26 February 1977 | 21 |
| 2 | 8 October 1977 | 25 March 1978 | 24 |
| 3 | 30 September 1978 | 24 March 1979 | 26 |
| 4 | 29 September 1979 | 22 March 1980 | 26 |
| 5 | 27 September 1980 | 28 March 1981 | 27 |
| 6 | 3 October 1981 | 27 March 1982 | 25 |

Out of the 146 episodes that were made in total, 41 survive. These are episode 21 of series 1, episodes 4, 5 and 21 of series 2, episode 24 of series 3, episodes 1, 2, 7, 12, 15, 17, 21 and 25 of series 4, episodes 1, 2, 12, 14 to 18, 21, 23, 25 and 27 of series 5 and episodes 1, 3, 5 to 7, 11, 13, 15 to 17, 19 to 22, 24 and 25 of series 6.

Due to industrial action by the ABS union at the BBC over Thursday 21 and Friday 22 December 1978, the edition which should have aired on Saturday 23 December 1978 was not transmitted. The reason being that the strike was only settled between the union and the BBC at 10.00pm on Friday 22 December 1978, and it was impossible for the live Swap Shop to be up and running in time for the 9.30am start the following morning. Instead BBC One returned to the air after being blacked out for two full days, at 3.00pm on Saturday 23 December 1978. Swap Shop finally returned on Saturday 30 December 1978.
