= Cheggers Plays Pop =

British TV children's game show (1978–1986)

- Genre: Children's game show
- Presented by: Keith Chegwin
- Country of origin: United Kingdom
- Original language: English
- No. of series: 9
- No. of episodes: 77 (inc. 4 specials)

Production
- Production location: New Broadcasting House
- Running time: 25 minutes
- Production company: BBC Manchester

Original release
- Network: BBC1
- Release: 10 April 1978 – 7 November 1986

Cheggers Plays Pop is a British children's game show broadcast on BBC1 from 10 April 1978 to 7 November 1986 hosted by Keith Chegwin, who was commonly known to the British public as "Cheggers". The show's format consisted of a series of physical and mental challenges undertaken by two teams of children representing their respective schools, together with studio performances by contemporary pop music acts.

There were two teams, Reds and Yellows, generally from schools in the North West area of the UK as the show was filmed at the BBC Manchester studios. Team captains were popular celebrities of the time.

Games involving balls and inflatables were played by the teams and a pop quiz too. Each episode also had a current chart single being performed in it.

At the end of the show, Cheggers would always blow his whistle and jump onto the inflatable that the final game had been played on; he led the children who all jumped on it in mayhem style to end the show.

== Transmissions ==
=== Series ===
Series	Start date	End date	Episodes
1	10 April 1978	19 June 1978	9
2	2 April 1979	11 June 1979	11
3	31 March 1980	9 June 1980	8
4	6 April 1981	15 June 1981	8
5	5 April 1982	14 June 1982	8
6	20 April 1983	8 June 1983	8
7	17 April 1984	5 June 1984	8
8	12 September 1985	31 October 1985	8
9	12 September 1986	7 November 1986	9

=== Christmas Specials ===
Date
22 December 1980
30 December 1981
26 December 1982
30 December 1983

=== Availability of episodes ===
Copies of almost all episodes are present in the BBC archives, with 75 out of 81 episodes surviving, The six missing episodes being:

- Series 6: Episodes 3, 6 and 7
- Series 7: Episodes 2, 3 and 5
