= We Have a Dream =

Single by The Scotland National Football Team
- B-side: "Wrap Up the Cup"
- Released: April 1982
- Genre: Novelty
- Length: 4:25
- Label: WEA
- Songwriter: BA Robertson
- Producer: BA Robertson

"We Have a Dream" was a special single released as the official song of the Scotland national football team for their 1982 World Cup Campaign. When first released, it reached number 5 in the UK Singles Chart.

== 2008 version ==
The single was re-released in 2008 to raise money for BBC Children In Need, featuring a host of celebrities and produced by original writer BA Robertson. The celebrities included Samuel L. Jackson, Ashley Jensen, Dougray Scott, Billy Boyd, Chris Hoy, Ally McCoist, Fred MacAulay, Karen Dunbar and Elaine C. Smith, along with Gregory's Girl actor John Gordon Sinclair, who sang the original. Scotland's 2010 FIFA World Cup qualification match against Norway also saw the Tartan Army play their part, as the fans were recorded roaring along to the track at half-time, helped by a karaoke-style prompt on the big screens at Hampden Park. The single, and subsequent live performance on BBC Scotland's live Children in Need show, also included the vocals of The Gospel Truth Choir.

== Charts ==
1982 version

Chart	Peak position
UK Singles (OCC)	5

2008 version

Chart	Peak position
Scotland Singles (OCC)	2
UK Singles (OCC)	40
