= Hold Me (1933 song) =

Popular song and standard

"Hold Me" is a popular song by Jack Little, Dave Oppenheim, and Ira Schuster. The song was published in 1933; it was recorded by co-writer Little (as Little Jack Little), and covered by Eddy Duchin, Greta Keller and Ted Fio Rito.

A new version was recorded by P. J. Proby in 1964, and reached No. 3 on the UK Singles Chart. The song features Jimmy Page on rhythm guitar, Big Jim Sullivan on lead guitar (using a fuzz box loaned to him by Page) and Bobby Graham on drums. Proby's version also charted at No. 10 in Ireland, becoming his only chart entry in that country.

== BA Robertson version ==
In 1981, it was covered by B. A. Robertson and Maggie Bell, reaching No. 11 on the UK chart, and also peaking at No. 11 in Ireland.

== Charts ==
Eddy Duchin and His Orchestra

Chart (1933)	Peak position
US Billboard Hot 100	11

Ted Fioroto and His Orchestra

Chart (1933)	Peak position
US Billboard Hot 100	12

Hotel Commodore Dance Orchestra

Chart (1933)	Peak position
US Billboard Hot 100	3

Don Cornell

Chart (1954)	Peak position
US Cash Box Top 100	26

P.J. Proby

Chart (1964)	Peak position
Australia (Kent Music Report)	13
Canada Top Singles (RPM)	5
Canada (CHUM)	4
Ireland (IRMA)	10
New Zealand (Lever Hit Parade)	5
UK Singles (Official Charts)	3
US Billboard Hot 100	70

Bert Kaempfert and His Orchestra

Chart (1967)	Peak position
US Easy Listening (Billboard)	37

The Baskerville Hounds

Chart (1969)	Peak position
US Billboard Hot 100	88

BA Robertson & Maggie Bell

Chart (1981–82)	Peak position
Australia (Kent Music Report)	31
Ireland (IRMA)	11
UK Singles (Official Charts)	11
