= Keith Chegwin =

English TV presenter, actor & musician (1957–2017)

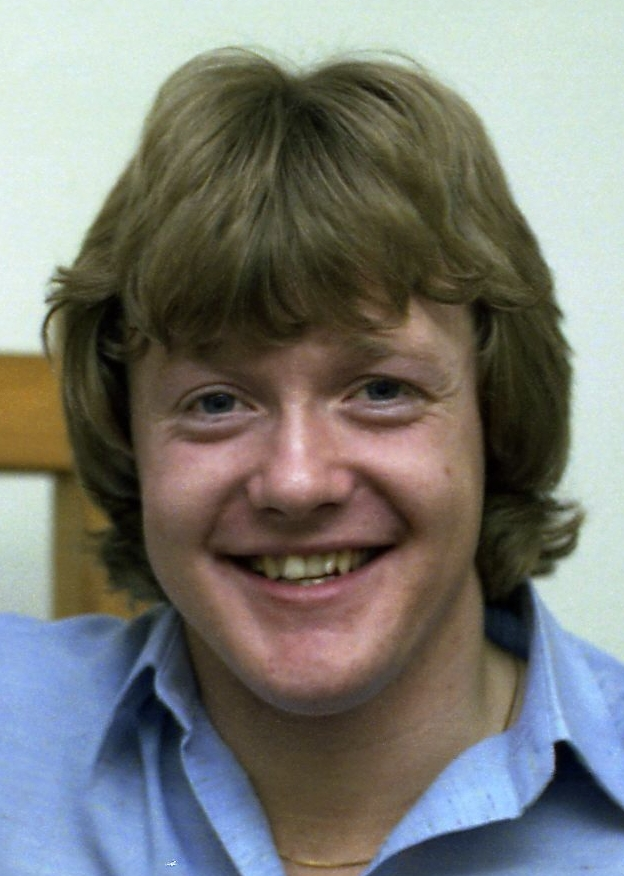
- Chegwin in 1981
- Born: 17 January 1957; Walton, Liverpool, England
- Died: 11 December 2017 (aged 60); Shropshire, England
- Occupations: Broadcaster; actor
- Years active: 1967–2017
- Spouses: Maggie Philbin (m. 1982; div. 1993); Maria Fielden (m. 2000)
- Children: 2
- Relatives: Janice Long (sister)

Keith Chegwin (17 January 1957 – 11 December 2017), also known by the nickname Cheggers, was an English television presenter and actor, appearing in several children's entertainment shows in the 1970s and 1980s, including Multi-Coloured Swap Shop and Cheggers Plays Pop.

Chegwin's early career saw him performing in such West End stage shows as Tom Brown's School Days and Captain Pugwash. He also had a career as a singer, releasing singles on the Pye Records label and worked as a disc jockey for 194 Radio City in Liverpool. He spent four years at BBC Radio 1 on Tony Blackburn's weekend morning show. In 2000, he presented the Channel 5 nudist game-show Naked Jungle, appearing naked except for a hat and later describing it as "the worst career move" in his life.

Chegwin was known for his off-the-cuff ad-lib style of broadcasting and stated that no one had ever written a word for him. In 2012, he was scheduled to take part in the 7th series of Dancing on Ice, but he was forced to withdraw after breaking three ribs and fracturing his shoulder on the first day of training. In 2015, he was a housemate on Celebrity Big Brother series 15 where he finished in fourth place.

Chegwin died on 11 December 2017 of the lung disease idiopathic pulmonary fibrosis.

== Early life ==
Chegwin was born in Walton, Liverpool, on 17 January 1957. His elder sister was future DJ Janice Long (1955–2021). He also had a twin brother, Jeff, with whom he attended stage school and whose son, Hugo Chegwin, co-created and starred in BBC Three mockumentary sitcom People Just Do Nothing.

Chegwin entered an end-of-the-pier talent competition in Rhyl, North Wales, and later joined 'The Happy Wanderers', a concert party that toured the pubs and clubs of the North West. He was then spotted by June Collins (mother of Phil Collins) of the Barbara Speake Stage School on Junior Showtime, a Yorkshire Television children's talent series. She invited him to London to audition for the stage show Mame with Ginger Rogers. He attended stage school with his twin brother, Jeff. As part of a play he performed in at the school, Chegwin sang the first song that Phil Collins ever wrote.

== Early career ==
While at school, Chegwin auditioned and gained roles on TV, film and stage. He appeared in Children's Film Foundation productions, including as Egghead Wentworth in The Troublesome Double (1967) and Egghead's Robot (1970). His most prestigious acting role was that of Fleance in Roman Polanski's film Macbeth (1971); he also had a small role in the film The Optimists of Nine Elms (1973).

In 1973 Chegwin appeared in the pilot episode of Open All Hours. After that he had parts in The Liver Birds, The Adventures of Black Beauty, My Old Man, Village Hall, Z-Cars (both 1974), ITV's The Wackers and The Tomorrow People serial Worlds Away (both 1975).

Chegwin's last major acting role was the title role in the film Robin Hood Junior (1975), although he had two small roles with Tom Courtenay in the Chester Mystery Cycle (1976) and some years later in the film Whatever Happened to Harold Smith? (1999). He appeared in TV ads for products such as Pepsi and Cadbury Creme Eggs as well as for Ready Brek, Toffo and Tizer, and was also associated with the Freemans catalogue.

Chegwin performed in West End stage shows such as Tom Brown's School Days with Russell Grant and Simon Le Bon; The Good Old Bad Old Days with Anthony Newley; and Captain Pugwash by John Kennett at the King's Road Theatre in 1973. He had a career as a singer, releasing singles on the Cherub and Pye record labels, such as 'I'll Never Fall in Love Again' (1977), but turned down an offer to front the band Kenny (who had a number 3 hit in the UK singles chart with "The Bump"). He also worked as a disc jockey for 194 Radio City in Liverpool, and worked at BBC Radio 1 on Tony Blackburn's weekend morning show for four years.

== Presenting and later career ==
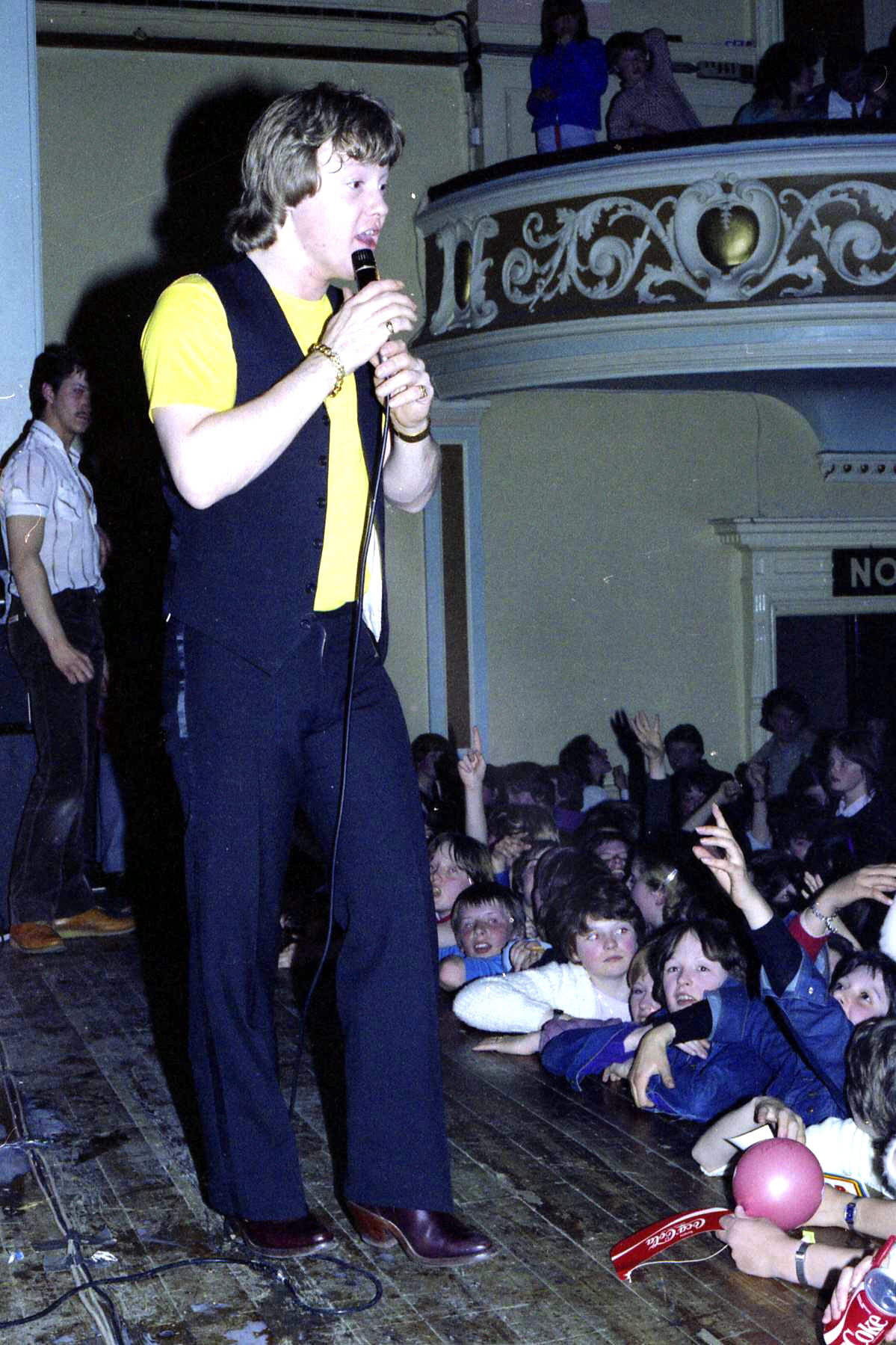
Chegwin on the stage of Ossett Town Hall in West Yorkshire in 1981

In the mid-1970s, Chegwin moved away from acting, becoming a household name presenting programmes such as Multi-Coloured Swap Shop (1976–82), Cheggers Plays Pop (1978–86) and, in the 1980s, Saturday Superstore. As Brown Sauce, he and Swap Shop co-presenters Noel Edmonds and Maggie Philbin released the pop single "I Wanna Be a Winner", which reached number 15 in January 1982, and a follow-up single as the Saucers called "Spring Has Sprung". On Swap Shop and Superstore, he was featured in outside broadcasts; on Swap Shop they were called Swaparama, appearing at outdoor venues around Britain, where he helped children swap their toys. On Superstore, Chegwin had a similar role.

Chegwin's career waned in the late 1980s and 1990s, due to his alcoholism, which he later described in his semi-autobiographical book, Shaken But Not Stirred. From 1989 to 1991, he hosted the live nightly Sky talent programme Sky Star Search. He stopped drinking after his appearance on the Richard and Judy show This Morning on 5 November 1992. His career regained speed in 1993 when he presented the "Down Your Doorstep" outside broadcast segment on The Big Breakfast and subsequently hosted the show from 1995 to 1996. He also presented a cookery show called The Heat is On for UK Living in 1997, of which one series was produced. He went on to present a revived version of the 1970s gameshow It's a Knockout on Channel 5 from 1999 to 2000.

In 2000 Chegwin presented an internet TV show, where his daily audience for the seven-week trial reached over 250,000. He presented the Yorkshire Television-made Channel 5 nudist gameshow Naked Jungle, appearing naked except for a hat. He later described making the show as "the worst career move" in his life.

Chegwin worked for seven years on GMTV. In 2006 he appeared as himself in an episode of Ricky Gervais and Stephen Merchant's comedy series Extras. He frequently wrote jingles for the Chris Moyles Breakfast Show on BBC Radio 1. For seven years he ran his own web-based bingo site Cheggersbingo.

In 2007 Chegwin voiced and starred in the quiz-based video game Cheggers Party Quiz, in which a CGI version of himself acts as a quizmaster. The game was developed by Oxygen Interactive and released on Nintendo Wii, PlayStation 2 and PC. The game was met with mixed reviews.

In November 2011 Chegwin played himself in the comedy horror film Kill Keith. In August 2012, he was presented with a Lifetime Achievement Award at the National Reality TV Awards.

Chegwin was originally set to take part in the seventh series of Dancing on Ice, but he was forced to withdraw after breaking three ribs and fracturing his shoulder on the first day of training with Jayne Torvill and Christopher Dean. He joined the eighth series of Dancing on Ice partnered with Olga Sharutenko. He was eliminated on 17 February 2013. From October 2013 to January 2014, he played the part of Drosselmeyer in the 'Nutcracker On Ice' with Imperial Ice Stars from Russia at the London Palladium.

On 19 October 2013 Chegwin took part in a celebrity episode of The Chase. In September 2014 he was a contestant on BBC1's Pointless Celebrities show.

In 2015 Chegwin took part in the fifteenth series of Celebrity Big Brother on Channel 5. On 6 February, he finished in fourth place. He took part in the 2015 series of Celebrity MasterChef, won by Kimberly Wyatt of the Pussycat Dolls. In the same year he made a cameo appearance as himself in BBC Two's comedy-drama A Gert Lush Christmas where he is revealed to be a friend of Tony (Greg Davies). He also hosted the 2015 BAFTA television and film industry awards.

In later years Chegwin performed as a pantomime dame, and in March 2016 he appeared in the Easter pantomime tour of Beauty and the Beast.

== Personal life ==
From 1982 to 1993, Chegwin was married to presenter Maggie Philbin with whom he had a daughter. He later married Maria Anne Fielden and they had a son.

Chegwin regularly made public appearances around the UK and was involved in charity work.

Chegwin and his wife lived in Ashmansworth, Hampshire, but moved to a country home in the area of Shropshire between Whitchurch and Wem, partly because they wanted to be closer to family further north.

== Death ==
In a 2001 interview, Chegwin said he smoked 60 cigarettes a day and was a recovering alcoholic. He died at his home in Shropshire on 11 December 2017, having been ill with idiopathic pulmonary fibrosis (IPF), a chronic lung disease, for an extended period. He was 60 years old.

== Filmography ==
Year	Title	Role	Notes
1967	The Troublesome Double	Egghead Wentworth	
1970	Egghead's Robot	Paul 'Egghead' Wentworth	
1971	Macbeth	Fleance	
1973	The Optimists of Nine Elms	Georgie	Uncredited
1975	Robin Hood Junior	Robin	
1999	Whatever Happened to Harold Smith?	Hugh Pimm	
2000	House!	Himself	
2001	Tabloid	Himself	
2001	The 51st State	Himself	
2004	Shaun of the Dead	Himself	Voice
2006	Extras	Himself	
2011	Kill Keith	Himself	
2011	Life's Too Short	Himself	

== Works ==
- Chegwin, Keith (1995). Shaken But Not Stirred. Hodder & Stoughton. ISBN 978-0-340-63978-8. (autobiography)

== See also ==
- List of Celebrity Big Brother (British TV series) housemates
- List of Dancing on Ice contestants
