= Bang Bang (BA Robertson song) =

1979 single by BA Robertson

Single by BA Robertson

from the album Initial Success
- B-side: "2 (b) B side The C side"
- Released: June 1979
- Genre: New wave
- Length: 3:20
- Label: Asylum Records
- Songwriter(s): BA Robertson; Terry Britten
- Producer(s): Terry Britten

BA Robertson singles chronology
"Goosebumps" (1979)	"Bang Bang" (1979)	"Knocked It Off" (1979)

"Bang Bang" is a song performed by BA Robertson. Co-written by Robertson with Terry Britten and produced by Britten, it was released as the second single from his third album Initial Success in 1979.

Lyrically, "Bang Bang" is a humorous commentary on the pitfalls of love. It uses the examples of famous couples such as Romeo and Juliet, Samson and Delilah, Horatio Nelson and Emma, Lady Hamilton and Mark Antony and Cleopatra. There is also a reference to John Fruin, who was head of WEA Records at the time. The song features the Glaswegian Robertson affecting an Estuary English accent. Many have considered this an impersonation of Ian Dury, whose "Hit Me with Your Rhythm Stick" had topped the UK Singles Chart in January 1979. Robertson has also spoken of comparisons to Squeeze, whose 1979 hit single "Cool for Cats" features a lead vocal performance from cockney-accented Squeeze lyricist Chris Difford. Robertson says the vocal was in fact an impression of session bass player Herbie Flowers.

"Bang Bang" was Robertson's second single with Asylum Records after the flop 'Goosebumps', and Robertson's future with the label would have been in doubt had it failed.

== Charts ==
=== Weekly charts ===
Chart (1979–1980)	Peak position
Australia (Kent Music Report)	53
Austria (Ö3 Austria Top 40)	13
Belgium (Ultratop 50 Flanders)	15
Ireland (IRMA)	5
Netherlands (Single Top 100)	42
UK Singles (OCC)	2
West Germany (GfK)	6

=== Year-end charts ===
Chart (1980)	Position
West Germany (Official German Charts)	48
