= Maggie Philbin =

English television presenter

Maggie Philbin OBE
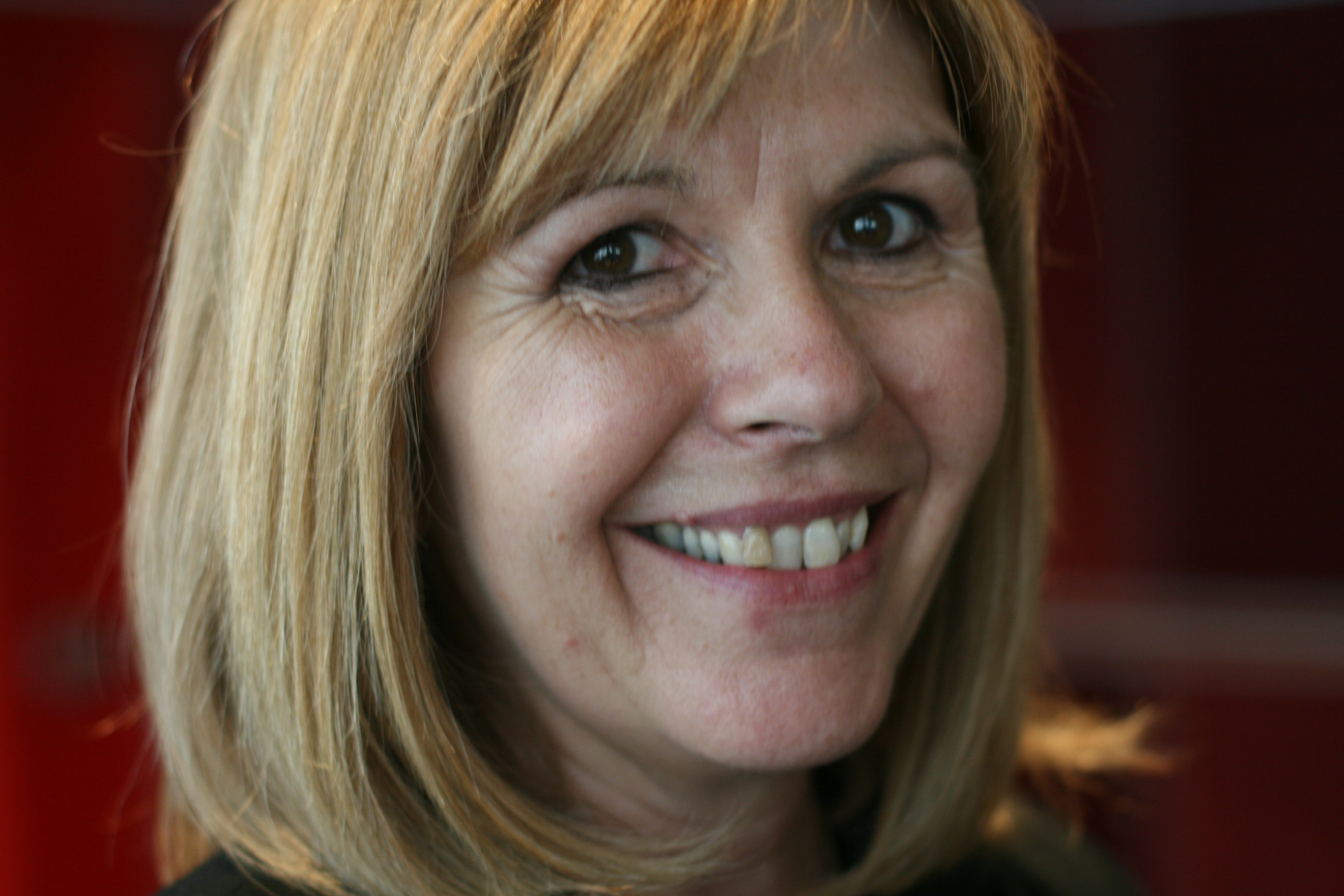
- Philbin in 2009
- Born: Margaret Elizabeth Philbin; 23 June 1955 (age 71); Manchester, England
- Education: University of Manchester
- Occupations: Television and radio presenter
- Spouse: Keith Chegwin (m. 1982; div. 1993)
- Children: 1

Margaret Elizabeth Philbin (born 23 June 1955) is a British radio and television presenter whose credits include Tomorrow's World, Multi-Coloured Swap Shop and latterly Bang Goes the Theory.

== Early life ==
As a child, she became interested in science through wanting to become a veterinary surgeon. She grew up in Leicester and went to a girls' Roman Catholic grammar school, Evington Hall Convent School in Evington.

In the sixth-form she studied English, History, French and German, although she says she was also good at Maths and Physics, but not Chemistry.

== Career ==
After studying English and Drama at the University of Manchester, Philbin responded to an advertisement in The Stage and was offered the job of co-presenter on Multi-Coloured Swap Shop. During her time on Swap Shop, with Noel Edmonds and others, she formed the one-hit wonder band Brown Sauce and had a No. 15 hit with "I Wanna Be a Winner" in 1981.

She returned to television on BBC1's flagship science and technology programme Tomorrow's World, on which she stayed for eight years. Since then, she has presented a variety of television and radio programmes, including Hospital Watch, Bodymatters Roadshow, Q.E.D., and BBC2's women's documentary series The Doll's House. Philbin flew upside down in a Hawker Hunter as part of the Tomorrow's World at Large series, and drove a Top Fuel dragster, earning her International Racing Licence. She decided not to race the car, which then spun out of control after a tyre exploded with top driver Dennis Priddle at the wheel.

She has worked as a medical and consumer reporter for ITV1's This Morning and presented film reports for BBC's current affairs programme 4x4, as well as a series of 20 programmes called Heartland for Channel Health. She has also presented 40 editions of the science programme Wideworld for Five. In October 2003, she spearheaded the BBC's Talking Teenagers project across television and radio. Starting in April 2004, she co-presented the BBC Radio Berkshire weekday breakfast show with Jim Cathcart before moving to the Andrew Peach show. She reunited with her former Swap Shop colleagues for a special programme celebrating the 30th anniversary of the programme, It Started With Swap Shop, in December 2006.

In 2008, she created TeenTech an interactive science and engineering event for teenagers. In 2010, it was awarded Best Engineering Event in National Science and Engineering Week by the British Science Association. In 2012, Prince Andrew, Duke of York became patron of TeenTech.

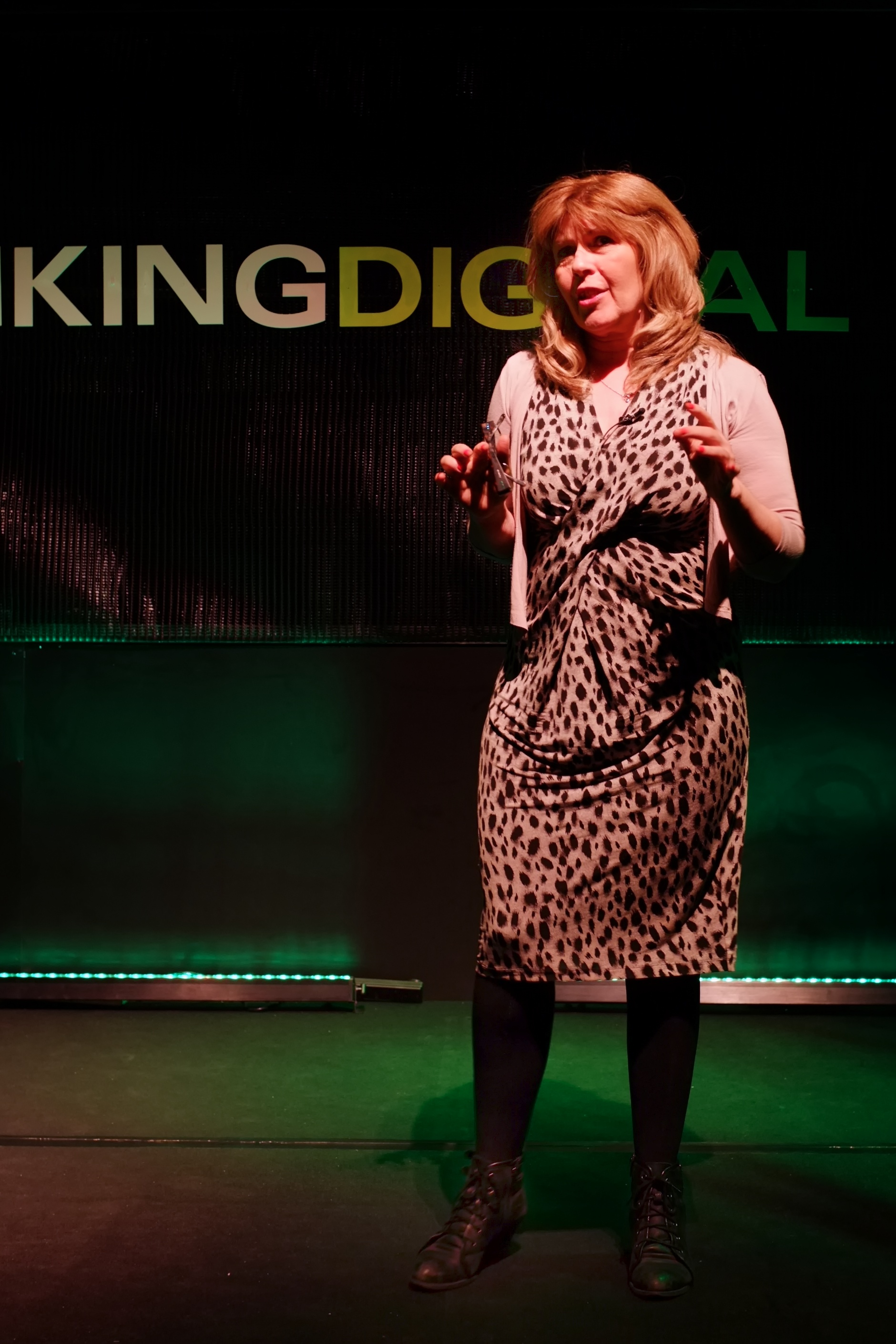
Philbin speaking at the Thinking Digital conference in 2013 at the Sage Gateshead

BBC News announced that she would be their face of technology on television, radio and online from 2007. In December 2011, she took part in BBC Radio 5 Live's first Science Night. She has launched the Helping Hand Campaign, encouraging digital switchover help for the elderly. She is a regular reporter on the BBC One regional programme Inside Out. She writes about technology for BBC WebWise and The Guardian.

On 25 July 2010, she featured as guest presenter in episode 3 of the LadyGeek App Show.

On 26 March 2012, she featured as guest presenter in episode 3 of the 6th series of the BBC TV show Bang Goes the Theory, about mobile phone internet security. From March 2013, she became a full-time presenter of the programme, appearing with co-presenters Liz Bonnin and Jem Stansfield.

In November 2013, she was asked to lead the UK Digital Skills Task Force which published an interim report in July 2014. On 14 October 2014, she appeared as a witness before the House of Lords Digital Skills Committee.

On 22 November 2018, she and Howard Stableford co-presented Tomorrow's World Live: For One Night Only, a 90-minute special edition broadcast on BBC Four.

== Personal life ==
She married her Swap Shop co-presenter Keith Chegwin in 1982; the couple divorced in 1993. They had a daughter, Rose, named after Rosemary Gill, the Swap Shop editor who gave Philbin a job on the programme.

== Honours and other activities ==
She is a patron of the National Osteoporosis Society and was invited by the IOF to sit on the Women leaders panel in Brussels in 2008. She is also a patron of the Daphne Jackson Trust helping scientists, engineers and technologists return to work after a career break. She was a Lay Council Member of the University of Warwick. In February 2015, she became patron of the Council of Professors and Heads of Computing. She was a board member of the Children's Media Foundation and a panel member of the Haringey STEM Commission.

On 26 August 2009, Philbin featured as a speaker at the London branch of Girl Geek Dinners at their fourth anniversary event. At this event she put forward her support and encouragement for women in the IT sector saying, "It's not about moaning about the negative side of things – tonight is about flagging up the things that really are making a difference for women, and looking at what we can change to make a difference. We are anxious to move forward."

In July 2012 she was awarded an Honorary Doctor of Technology degree by De Montfort University for services to the world of science and technology. In November 2012, Anne, Princess Royal presented her with the award for Communication and Outreach in the 2012 WISE Women of Outstanding Achievement Awards. In 2013, she was given the Promotion of Design Award by the Institution of Engineering Designers. In March 2014, she was elected president of the IED in recognition of her ongoing work to support and promote science, technology and engineering. On 3 July 2014, Computer Weekly named her as the 5th most influential woman in UK IT and on 3 December 2014 as the 23rd most influential person in UK IT. In 2015, Philbin was identified as the 4th most influential woman in UK IT 2015, by Computer Weekly. In July 2015, she was made an honorary fellow of Queen Mary University of London. On 9 December 2015, she received the honorary degree of Doctor of Science from the Earl of Wessex, Chancellor of the University of Bath, at a ceremony held in the city's Assembly Rooms.

In the 2016 Digital Leaders 100 Awards, she was voted Digital Leader of the Year. In June 2016, she was named as Computer Weekly's most influential woman in its UK IT 2016 award. In July 2016, she was conferred with an honorary doctorate of the University of Huddersfield for services to science broadcasting and technology education. In the 2017 New Year Honours list, she was appointed OBE for services to promoting careers in STEM and creative industries. In June 2017, she officially opened the 50th Bedford Park Festival. On 10 July 2017, she accepted the honorary degree of Doctor of Technology from Southampton Solent University. On 11 July 2017, she was presented with the AbilityNet Tech4Good Special Award for her contribution to technology. On 12 July 2017, Computer Weekly recognised her lifetime contribution by entering her in their Hall of Fame. On 25 January 2018, the University of Leicester honoured her with a Doctor of Science degree. On 28 January 2019, she was given an honorary degree by the University of Roehampton. On 16 July 2019, she was awarded an honorary fellowship by the University of Wales Trinity Saint David. On 17 May 2022, she was honoured with a Doctor of Science degree by the University of Manchester.

Professional and academic associations
Preceded by Sir George Cox	President of the Institution of Engineering Designers; 2014–2018	Succeeded by Pete Lomas
