= The Venue (Victoria Street, London) =

Former music venue in London (1978 - 1984)

Coordinates: 51.4981°N 0.1332°W

The Venue was a live music club at 160–162 Victoria Street, London, England, owned by Virgin Records. It opened its doors on 1 November 1978 and operated until 1984. The first act to play there was Graham Parker and The Rumour, followed by the last live performances by Alex Harvey before his death. Todd Rundgren played some dates there just before Christmas in 1978, as part of the tour to back up the Back to the Bars album; released for the Christmas market, at the time. Two shows were sometimes played per night, and the ambience was akin to a nightclub, where audience members sat at tables and could have drinks and meals while listening to the acts. It was also popular for use by record companies showcasing new signings to the music media.

== Additional info ==
The original sound system was supplied by Eastlake systems, it was their first foray into live sound. Soon afterwards, Dave Martin from Martin Audio, a company that designed installed and touring PA sound system of the era, replaced the Hidley system with a familiar looking stack of bass bins, mid-range units and HF loudspeakers arrayed either side of the stage. The result was loud and clean, with sound covering the audience far better than the previous rig; sound under the balcony overhang was still problematic, but more the result of poor auditorium design.

The building first opened as the Metropole cinema on 27 December 1929. After The Venue closed, it was occupied by a Dicky Dirt's discount jeans shop in the mid 1980s and was a branch of the restaurant chain "Ask" prior to its demolition in early 2013 as part of a major redevelopment of the area.

== Acts that played at The Venue ==
(In A-Z order.)

- 23 Skidoo
- After the Fire
- Al Green
- Alan Price
- Alan Vega (1 Jun 1982, 23 Oct 1983)
- Alberto y Lost Trios Paranoias (18 Apr 1981)
- Alex Harvey
- Altered Images (23 Sept 1981)
- Angelo Branduardi 2–3 February 1979
- Bert Jansch and Albert Lee
- B-Movie (1984)
- Bethnal (28 April 1979)
- Bette Bright (4 June 1981) - alongside Motor Boys Motor
- Big Country
- Bill Haley and the Comets (17-20 November 1979)
- Blancmange
- Blue Öyster Cult (19 Aug 1981) - playing under the name Soft White Underbelly
- Blue 1979 - with support band Kokomo
- Brand X
- Bruford
- Bush Tetras
- Cabaret Voltaire (band)
- Captain Beefheart and the Magic Band (12 and 14 Nov 1980)
- Chameleons
- Charlie Dore
- Charlie Haden's Liberation Music Orchestra
- Chaz Jankel
- Chris Rea
- Chuck Berry
- Clint Eastwood & General Saint
- Cocteau Twins (16 Nov 1982)
- Cold Chisel
- David Crosby (21 Apr 1980)
- Curtis Mayfield
- Dan Hicks (28 Mar 1979)
- Dave Edmunds
- Defunkt
- Delta 5
- Depeche Mode (23 July 1981)
- Devo (1979)
- Doll by Doll (18 Dec 1979)
- Fad Gadget (16 Feb 1983)
- Famous Blues Blasters
- Felt (15 Sept 1983) - opening for the Smiths
- The Four Bucketeers (22 Feb 1981)
- Freeez
- Furyo / Mecenary Skank (17 Apr 1984)
- Gary U.S. Bonds (14 Aug 1981)
- Gil Scott-Heron
- Ginger Baker's NNG (21 Sept 1979)
- Georgie Fame
- Golden Earring
- Graham Parker & the Rumour (1 Nov 1978)
- Grandmaster Flash and the Furious Five
- Hall & Oates
- Hambi and the Dance
- Herbie Hancock
- Hi Tension
- Hugh Masekela
- Icehouse (22 Jul 1981)
- Iggy Pop (with Nico)
- Incredible Kidda Band
- James Blood Ulmer
- James Brown
- Jan Akkerman
- Japan (30 January 1980)
- John Cale
- John Cooper Clarke (10 Dec 1980)
- John Miles (8 June 1979)
- John Stewart
- Johnny Winter
- Judy Tzuke
- Junior Walker and the Allstars
- Kajagoogoo (21 Jan 1983)
- Kate & Anna McGarrigle (4 Aug 1981)
- King Crimson (8 October 1981)
- Klaus Schulze (22 Sep 1982)
- Kokomo (band)
- Legs and Co.
- Level 42 (21 Aug 1981)
- Light Of The World
- Lindisfarne
- Machito
- Magazine
- McGuinn, Clark & Hillman
- Marillion (26 Nov 1982)
- Men at Work (25 Nov 1982)
- Merger (1981)
- Motor Boys Motor (4 Jun 1981) - alongside Bette Bright
- Mink DeVille (Friday 13 Nov 1981)
- Naked Lunch, 21 September 1981
- Nikki Sudden band
- Nina Hagen
- Nine Below Zero
- New Musik (24 March 1981)
- Paul Brady (6 May 1981)
- Peter Green and White Sky (16 Jan 1982)
- Peter Hammill
- Pigbag (9 Dec 1981)
- Q-Tips (11 Sep 1981 and 27 Mar 1982)
- Queen Ida
- Ramones (19 Nov 1981)
- Richard and Linda Thompson
- Rick Wakeman (22 Aug 1979)
- Rip Rig + Panic (9 Sept 1982)
- Robert Hunter (19 June 1980)
- Robyn Hitchcock (1982)
- Rock Goddess
- Rocket 88 (featuring Alexis Korner)
- Rockin' Dopsie
- Roger Chapman and the Shortlist
- Roman Holliday
- Rory Gallagher (July 1979)
- Roy Harper
- Shakatak
- Shannon
- Shock (troupe)
- Sniff 'n' the Tears (10 Jun 1981)
- Snips
- Sonic Youth (first London appearance) (1 Dec 1983)
- Sonny Terry and Brownie Mcghee
- Southside Johnny & The Asbury Jukes (on the 1983 Trash It Up! tour)
- Spirit
- Steve Hackett
- Steve Harley and Cockney Rebel
- Steve Hillage (10 Apr 1979)
- Stevie Ray Vaughan (8 Sept 1983)
- Sun Ra
- Sylvester and the Two Tons O' Fun (4 July 1979)
- Taj Mahal
- The Alarm - (7 December 1981) - opening for The Fall
- The Armoury Show
- The Birthday Party
- The Blow Monkeys (16 Feb 1983) - opening for Fad Gadget
- The Blues Band
- The Cars
- The Charlie Daniels Band
- The Cramps
- The Fall (7 December 1981) - supported by The Alarm
- The Go-Betweens (15 Sept 1983) - opening for the Smiths
- The Go-Go's
- The Members (11 Apr 1981)
- The Monochrome Set (5 March 1981, 26 July 1982, 2 November 1982)
- The Passions (17 Oct 1981)
- The Piranhas (1981)
- The Polecats (4 Apr 1981)
- The Pretty Things
- The Rivits (featuring Jess Roden)
- The Roches
- The Skids (10 February 1981. Live broadcast by Capital Radio. Final live performance with the band by guitarist Stuart Adamson and drummer Mike Baillie)
- The Slits
- The Smiths (15 Sept 1983)
- The Sugarhill Gang (Feb 1980)
- The Vapors (27 Mar 1981)
- The Yachts
- T34 (three times in 1982) (This is not T-34, the rock band featuring Al Murray.)
- Tik and Tok
- Tina Turner (16 Dec 1983)
- Tito Puente
- Todd Rundgren (Dec 1978)
- Tom Verlaine (9 and 10 June 1982)
- Tones On Tail
- Tuxedomoon
- UK
- U2 (18 Dec 1979)
- Violent Femmes (July 1984)
- Violinski (May 1079)
- Virgin Prunes (March 1981)
- Wang Chung (4 Feb 1982) (as "Huang Chung")
- Wilko Johnson
- XTC (1980)
- Yellow Magic Orchestra (16 & 24 October 1979)
- Zeitgeist
