= Terry Britten =

British-Australian musician (born 1947)

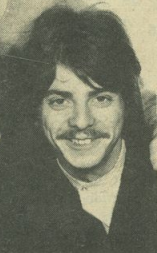
- Britten circa 1968

Background information
- Born: Terence Ernest Britten; 17 July 1947 (age 79); Manchester, England
- Genre: Pop
- Occupations: Musician; singer-songwriter; record producer
- Instruments: Vocals; guitar
- Years active: 1964–present
- Formerly of: the Twilights

Terence Ernest Britten (born 17 July 1947) is a British-Australian singer-songwriter and record producer, who has written songs for Tina Turner, Cliff Richard, Olivia Newton-John, Status Quo and Michael Jackson amongst many others. Britten (along with co-writer Graham Lyle) won the Grammy Award for Song of the Year in 1985 for "What's Love Got to Do with It".

== Career ==
Britten was born on 17 July 1947 in Manchester, England, and began writing for the Adelaide, Australia band The Twilights, a popular 1960s band for which he played lead guitar. At times he co-wrote with Glenn Shorrock and Peter Brideoake. He also recorded a single under his own name, "2000 Weeks" / "Bargain Day" (1969).

Britten was a band member of Quartet with Kevin Peek, Alan Tarney and Trevor Spencer who recorded one album with Decca Records in the UK, which remains unreleased. One single was issued in 1969 on Decca in the UK and Australia and London in the US: "Now" / "Will My Lady Come" (Decca UK-F12974, Aust Y-8977) and a second single in the UK only in 1970 "Joseph" / "Mama Where Did You Fail" (Decca F13072, US London LON-1031).

After the Twilights broke up, he returned to England and moved to London, where he did session work. Britten's multi-layered guitars featured on Alvin Stardust's 1973 hit "My Coo Ca Choo". In 1973 he was part of Cliff Richard's Eurovision Song Contest 1973 entry and, along with John Farrar, Alan Tarney and Trevor Spencer, submitted six songs; of which "Power to All Our Friends" was chosen and came third. After a lean charting period for Cliff Richard, Britten gave him "Devil Woman" and, in 1976, it became Richard's first top 10 in the UK for three years (and his first top 10 hit in the US). He was a guitarist in Richard's band for many years and was the co-producer and main songwriter for Richard's 1979 album Rock 'n' Roll Juvenile, which reached No. 3 in the UK Album Chart. He wrote or co-wrote ten of the twelve songs with B. A. Robertson; one, "Carrie", reached No. 4 in the UK Singles Chart.

In 1979-80 Britten produced and wrote or co-wrote the album Magic Rhythm for the Australian singer Christie Allen, and contributed two to her second album, Detour.

In 1984 Britten's psychedelic rock song, "9.50", originally a hit for The Twilights, was revived by Australia's Divinyls as a b-side to their single, "Good Die Young".

Britten wrote "What's Love Got to Do with It" with Graham Lyle; the song became a million-selling hit for Tina Turner. In 1984 "What's Love Got to Do with It" reached No. 3 in the UK Singles Chart and No. 1 in the US Billboard Hot 100, and won Britten and Lyle the Grammy Award for Song of the Year in 1985. It also won the Grammy Award for Record of the Year which went to Tina Turner. Later that year, they co-wrote "We Don't Need Another Hero" for the film Mad Max Beyond Thunderdome. Also sung by Tina Turner, the song reached No. 2 in the US and No. 3 in the UK. Britten and Lyle received a Golden Globe Award nomination for Best Original Song in 1986. It also earned Turner a 1986 Grammy nomination for best female pop vocal performance. He also acted as a record producer for Turner.

Britten co-wrote "Just Good Friends" for Michael Jackson's Bad album. Britten has also penned songs for Olivia Newton-John, including "Love Make Me Strong" (1981) and "Toughen Up" with Graham Lyle (1985). He has also written for Meat Loaf, Melissa Manchester, Bonnie Raitt, and Hank Marvin. Britten continues to compose from his home base in rural England, but has returned to Australia on occasion, including the Twilights' reunion for the Long Way to the Top concert tour.

In 2002, the song "Rain, Tax (It's Inevitable)", co-written by Britten and Charlie Dore, appeared on Celine Dion's album A New Day Has Come.

Britten currently has a home in Richmond, Greater London, and a home recording studio called "State of the Ark".

== Songwriting credits ==
- "9.50" – The Twilights, Divinyls
- "A Little TLC" - Marlene, Kidd Video, Sam Hui, Menudo (group)/Ricky Martin
- "Absolutely Nothing's Changed" – Tina Turner
- "Afterglow" – Tina Turner
- "Age of Consent" – Ronnie Burns
- "Always" – Cliff Richard
- "Am I Fooling Myself" – Dan Hill
- "Appeal" – Marty Rhone
- "Bang Bang" – BA Robertson
- "Baptized" - Lenny Kravitz
- "Carolina" – James Royal, Creation (New Zealand band)
- "Carrie" – Cliff Richard
- "Cathy Come Home" – The Twilights
- "Celestial Houses" – Cliff Richard
- "Change of Heart" – Diana Ross
- "Circus" – Lenny Kravitz
- "Cities May Fall" – Cliff Richard
- "Count Me Out" – Cliff Richard
- "Devil Woman" – Cliff Richard
- "Do What You Do" – Tina Turner
- "Doing Fine" – Cliff Richard
- "Don't Push Me to My Limit" – Vivienne McKone
- "Don't Put Out The Flame" – Christie Allen
- "Don't Talk" – Hank Marvin, Normie Rowe
- "Everybody Move" – Cathy Dennis
- "Fallin' in Luv" – Cliff Richard, Christie Allen (as "Falling in Love With Only You")
- "Free My Soul" – Cliff Richard
- "Getting Away with Murder" – Meat Loaf, Randy Crawford, Patti Austin
- "Give It Up (Old Habits)" – Hall & Oates
- "Golden Days" – Bucks Fizz
- "Goosebumps" – Christie Allen
- "Happy Ending" – The Peter Cupples Band (from The Pirate Movie)
- "Heart User" – Paul Di'Anno, Cliff Richard
- "Heaven Help" – Lenny Kravitz
- "He's My Number One" – Christie Allen
- "Hot Shot" – Cliff Richard
- "How Can I Live Without Her" – Christopher Atkins (from The Pirate Movie)
- "I Bless the Day" – Mica Paris
- "I Want You Near Me" – Tina Turner
- "I Wish You'd Change Your Mind" – Cliff Richard
- "If I Never See You Again" – Wet Wet Wet
- "Jam Side Down" – Status Quo
- "Joseph" – Quartet, Cliff Richard
- "Just Good Friends" – Michael Jackson and Stevie Wonder
- "Knocked It Off" – BA Robertson
- "Language of Love" – Cliff Richard
- "Love Make Me Strong" – Olivia Newton-John
- "Magic Rhythm" – Christie Allen
- "Michael Alexander" – The Cliffmores
- "Moments of Love" – Cathy Dennis
- "Must Be Love" – Cliff Richard
- "My Luck Won't Change" – Cliff Richard
- "Never Say Die (Give a Little Bit More)" – Cliff Richard
- "No One Can Love You More Than Me" – The Weather Girls, Melissa Manchester
- "Now" – Quartet
- "Old Habits Die Hard" – Dusty Springfield
- "Once in a Lifetime Love" – Carl Anderson
- "One Times, Two Times, Three Times, Four" – Zoot
- "Rain, Tax (It's Inevitable)" – Celine Dion
- "Rise Up" - Cliff Richard
- "Sailing" – Zoot
- "Sci-fi" – Cliff Richard
- "See How The Love Goes" – The Pointer Sisters
- "She's Trouble" – Michael Jackson and Musical Youth
- "Show Some Respect" – Tina Turner
- "Something Beautiful Remains" – Tina Turner
- "Soul Inspiration" – Anita Baker
- "Spider Man" – Cliff Richard
- "Start All Over Again – Cliff Richard
- "Stay Awhile" – Tina Turner
- "Storm Warning" – Bonnie Raitt, Bob James
- "Straight to the Heart" – Crystal Gayle
- "Takes a Woman to Know" – Lisa Stansfield, No Angels
- "The Best is Yet to Come" – Marilyn Martin, Luba
- "The Golden Days are Over" – Cliff Richard
- "The Radio Was Playing Johnny Come Lately" – Colin Blunstone
- "The Trouble with Me is You" – Hank Marvin
- "Till The Right Man Comes Along" – Tina Turner
- "Toughen Up" – Olivia Newton-John
- "Twiddle-e-dee" – The Avengers
- "Yes I'm Glad" – Zoot
- "She's Alright" – Zoot
- "Two People" – Tina Turner
- "Typical Male" – Tina Turner
- "Under Fire" – Jackie
- "Under Lock and Key" – Cliff Richard
- "Walking in the Light" – Cliff Richard
- "We Don't Need Another Hero" – Tina Turner
- "We Got All Night" – America
- "We Got Love (Real Thing)" – The Real Thing
- "What a Silly Thing To Do" - Cliff Richard
- "What You Get Is What You See" – Tina Turner
- "What's Love Got to Do with It" – Tina Turner, Bucks Fizz
- "While She's Young" – Cliff Richard
- "Willpower" – Taylor Dayne
- "Yes He Lives" – Cliff Richard
- "You Belong To Me" – Anita Baker
- "You Got Me Wondering" – Cliff Richard
- "You Know That I Love You" – Cliff Richard

== Filmography ==
Britten's work has appeared in the soundtracks to the following films:

- The Pirate Movie – 1982
- The Jewel of the Nile – 1985
- Mad Max Beyond Thunderdome - 1985
- 9½ Weeks – 1986
- The Taking of Beverly Hills – 1991
- What's Love Got to Do with It – 1993

== Award and nominations ==
=== TV Week / Countdown Awards ===
Countdown was an Australian pop music TV series on national broadcaster ABC-TV from 1974 to 1987, it presented music awards from 1979 to 1987, initially in conjunction with magazine TV Week. The TV Week / Countdown Awards were a combination of popular-voted and peer-voted awards.

Year	Nominee / work	Award	Result
1979	Terry Britten for "He's My Number One" by Christie Allen	Best Recorded Songwriter	Won

=== Australian Songwriters Hall of Fame ===
The Australian Songwriters Hall of Fame was established in 2004 to honour the lifetime achievements of some of Australia's greatest songwriters.

Year	Nominee / work	Award	Result
2021	Himself	Australian Songwriters Hall of Fame	inducted
