= List of top 25 albums for 1988 in Australia =

Top 25 albums of 1988 < 1987 1989 >

Other Australian top charts for 1988
- top 25 singles

Australian top 40 charts for the 1980s
- singles
- albums

Australian number-one charts of 1988
- albums
- singles

These are the top 50 albums of 1988 in Australia from the Australian Recording Industry Association (ARIA) End of Year Albums Chart. These were the first End of Year album charts created by ARIA, it had started producing its own charts from mid-1988. ARIA had previously used the Kent Music Report, known from 1987 onwards as the Australian Music Report.

#	Title	Artist	Highest pos. reached	Weeks at No. 1
1.	Kick	INXS	1	1 (Note: Kick had entered the Kent Music Report in October 1987 and peaked at #1. It was at #27 in August 1988 then returned to #2 by November on the ARIA chart and was still in the Top 50 for nine weeks in 1989.)
2.	Dirty Dancing	Motion Picture Soundtrack	1	8 (Note: Dirty Dancing had entered the Kent Music Report in August 1987 and peaked at #1 for eight weeks from February to April 1988. It was at #12 in June 1988 on the ARIA chart and still in the Top 50 for eight weeks in 1989.)
3.	Freight Train Heart	Jimmy Barnes	1	5 (Note: Freight Train Heart had entered the Kent Music Report in late 1987 and peaked at #1 for five weeks in December / January. It was at #20 in June 1988 on the ARIA chart and left the Top 50 by end of December.)
4.	Whenever You Need Somebody	Rick Astley	1	1 (Note: Whenever You Need Somebody had entered the Kent Music Report in early 1988 and peaked at #1 for one week in April. It was at #14 in July 1988 on the ARIA chart and left the Top 50 by end of September.)
5.	The Lonesome Jubilee	John Cougar Mellencamp	2	
6.	Man of Colours	Icehouse	1	11 (Note: Man of Colours had entered the Kent Music Report in September 1987 and peaked at #1 for eleven weeks from October to December. It was at #21 in June 1988 on the ARIA chart and left the Top 50 by end of August.)
7.	Tracy Chapman	Tracy Chapman	3	
8.	Introducing the Hardline According to Terence Trent D'Arby	Terence Trent D'Arby	1	5
9.	Push	Bros	4	
10.	Whispering Jack	John Farnham	1	25 (Note: Whispering Jack had entered the Kent Music Report in January 1986 and peaked at #1 for a total of 25 weeks during 1986 and 1987. It was at #9 in August 1988 on the ARIA chart and was still in the Top 50 for two weeks in 1989. It returned to the Top 50 for one week in 2006.)
11.	Faith	George Michael	3	
12.	Tour of Duty	TV Soundtrack	3	
13.	Age of Reason	John Farnham	1	9 (Note: Age of Reason debuted at #1 in August 1988 on the ARIA chart and was still in the Top 50 for 14 weeks in 1989.)
14.	Temple of Low Men	Crowded House	1	2 (Note: Temple of Low Men peaked at #1 in July 1988 on the ARIA chart for one week and was still in the Top 50 for four weeks in 1989.)
15.	Good Morning, Vietnam	Motion Picture Soundtrack	2	
16.	Open Up and Say... Ahh!	Poison	2	
17.	Kylie	Kylie Minogue	2	
18.	A Momentary Lapse of Reason	Pink Floyd	2	
19.	Bonk	Big Pig	5	
20.	Lap of Luxury	Cheap Trick	6	
21.	Big Bad Noise	The Choirboys	11	
22.	Wow!	Bananarama	1	1
23.	Heavy Nova	Robert Palmer	2	
24.	Cloud Nine	George Harrison	4	
25.	Wired World of Sports	The Twelfth Man	1	3 (Note: Wired World of Sports peaked at #1 in January / February 1988 on the Kent Music Report for three weeks and did not appear on the ARIA Top 50.)
26.	Noiseworks	Noiseworks	2	
27.	Diesel and Dust	Midnight Oil	1	6
28.	Tiffany	Tiffany	6	
29.	Hit Pix '88	Various Artists	1	3
30.	'88 Kix On	Various Artists	1	4
31.	Tales of the City	Rockmelons	14	
32.	Live Line	The Angels	2	
33.	Monsoon	Little River Band	9	
34.	Richard Marx	Richard Marx	7	
35.	You've Always Got the Blues	Kate Ceberano and Wendy Matthews	7	
36.	Tango in the Night	Fleetwood Mac	5	
37.	Tour of Duty II	TV Soundtrack	5	
38.	Appetite for Destruction	Guns N' Roses	7	
39.	Union	Toni Childs	8	
40.	88 the Winners	Various Artists	1	4
41.	Chantoozies	Chantoozies	8	
42.	Blow Up Your Video	AC/DC	2	
43.	Bad	Michael Jackson	2	
44.	Pump It Up '88	Various Artists	37	
45.	...Nothing Like the Sun	Sting	3	
46.	OU812	Van Halen	9	
47.	Boomerang Cafe	John Williamson	10	
48.	Unchain My Heart	Joe Cocker	24	
49.	Vital Idol	Billy Idol	12	
50.	1988 What's Hot	Various Artists	2	

Peak chart positions from 1987 and early 1988 were calculated by David Kent for the Kent Music Report. Late 1988 peak chart positions are from the ARIA Charts. Overall position on the End of Year Chart is calculated by ARIA based on the number of weeks and position that the records reach within the Top 50 albums for each week during 1988.
