= List of top 25 albums for 1984 in Australia =

Top 25 albums of 1984 < 1983 1985 >

Other Australian top charts for 1984
- top 25 singles

Australian top 40 charts for the 1980s
- singles
- albums

Australian number-one charts of 1984
- albums
- singles

The following lists the top 25 (end of year) charting albums on the Australian Album Charts, for the year of 1984. These were the best charting albums in Australia for 1984. The source for this year is the "Kent Music Report", known from 1987 onwards as the "Australian Music Report".

#	Title	Artist	Highest pos. reached	Weeks at No. 1
1.	Can't Slow Down	Lionel Richie	1	3
2.	Thriller	Michael Jackson	1	11 (pkd #1 in 1983 & 84)
3.	Colour by Numbers	Culture Club	1	7 (pkd #1 in 1983 & 84)
4.	The Swing	INXS	1	5
5.	Under a Blood Red Sky	U2	2	
6.	An Innocent Man	Billy Joel	3	
7.	Born in the USA	Bruce Springsteen	1	7
8.	Too Low for Zero	Elton John	2	
9.	Rodney Rude Live	Rodney Rude	1	2
10.	Madonna	Madonna	10	
11.	1100 Bel Air Place	Julio Iglesias	2	
12.	Touch	Eurythmics	4	
13.	Purple Rain	Soundtrack / Prince	1	1
14.	Footloose	Original Soundtrack	2	
15.	Twentieth Century	Cold Chisel	1	1
16.	Breaking Hearts	Elton John	1	3
17.	Private Dancer	Tina Turner	7	
18.	Live from Earth	Pat Benatar	2	
19.	H'its Huge '84	Various Artists	1	5
20.	Eliminator	ZZ Top	2	
21.	Legend	Bob Marley and the Wailers	2	
22.	Alchemy	Dire Straits	3	
23.	Throbbin' '84	Various Artists	1	5
24.	She's So Unusual	Cyndi Lauper	3	
25.	Twenty Greatest Hits	Kenny Rogers	2	

These charts are calculated by David Kent of the Kent Music Report and they are based on the number of weeks and position the records reach within the top 100 albums for each week.

source: David Kent's "Australian Chart Book 1970-1992"
