= List of top 25 albums for 1983 in Australia =

Top 25 albums of 1983 < 1982 1984 >

Other Australian top charts for 1983
- top 25 singles

Australian top 40 charts for the 1980s
- singles
- albums

Australian number-one charts of 1983
- albums
- singles

The following lists the top 25 (end of year) charting albums on the Australian Album Charts, for the year of 1983. These were the best charting albums in Australia for 1983. The source for this year is the "Kent Music Report", known from 1987 onwards as the "Australian Music Report".

#	Title	Artist	Highest pos. reached	Weeks at No. 1
1.	Thriller	Michael Jackson	1	11 (pkd #1 in 1983 & 84)
2.	10, 9, 8, 7, 6, 5, 4, 3, 2, 1	Midnight Oil	3	
3.	Too Low for Zero	Elton John	2	
4.	Let's Dance	David Bowie	1	1
5.	Flashdance	Original Soundtrack	1	3
6.	Love Over Gold	Dire Straits	1	14 (pkd #1 in 1982 & 83)
7.	The Key	Joan Armatrading	4	
8.	Spirit of Place	Goanna	2	
9.	Synchronicity	The Police	1	3
10.	True	Spandau Ballet	4	
11.	An Innocent Man	Billy Joel	3	
12.	Business as Usual	Men At Work	1	9 (pkd #1 in 1981 & 82)
13.	Greatest Hits vol 3	Olivia Newton-John	1	2
14.	Cargo	Men at Work	1	2
15.	The Breakers '83	Various Artists	1	2
16.	Making Love... The Very Best of Air Supply	Air Supply	1	1
17.	Desperate	Divinyls	5	
18.	1983 The Hot Ones	Various Artists	1	4
19.	Sweet Dreams	Eurythmics	5	
20.	Escapade	Tim Finn	8	
21.	IV	Toto	1	1
22.	Shabooh Shoobah	INXS	5	
23.	The John Lennon Collection	John Lennon	1	5
24.	Faster Than the Speed of Night	Bonnie Tyler	3	
25.	Colour by Numbers	Culture Club	1	7 (pkd #1 in 1983 & 84)

These charts are calculated by David Kent of the Kent Music Report and they are based on the number of weeks and position the records reach within the top 100 albums for each week.

source: David Kent's "Australian Chart Book 1970-1992"
