= List of top 25 albums for 1989 in Australia =

Top 25 albums of 1989 < 1988 1990 >

Other Australian top charts for 1989
- top 25 singles
- Triple J Hottest 100

Australian top 40 charts for the 1980s
- singles
- albums

Australian number-one charts of 1989
- albums
- singles

These are the top 50 albums of 1989 in Australia from the Australian Recording Industry Association (ARIA) End of Year Albums Chart. These were the second End of Year album charts created by ARIA, it had started producing its own charts from mid-1988. ARIA had previously used the Kent Music Report, known from 1987 onwards as the Australian Music Report.

| # | Title | Artist | Highest pos. reached | Weeks at No. 1 |
|---|---|---|---|---|
| 1. | Volume One | Traveling Wilburys | 1 | 2 |
| 2. | ...Ish | 1927 | 1 | 4 |
| 3. | Hysteria | Def Leppard | 1 | 3 |
| 4. | The Raw and the Cooked | Fine Young Cannibals | 1 | 1 |
| 5. | Edge | Daryl Braithwaite | 1 | 3 |
| 6. | Like a Prayer | Madonna | 4 | |
| 7. | Johnny Diesel and the Injectors | Johnny Diesel | 2 | |
| 8. | Beaches | Soundtrack / Bette Midler | 1 | 4 |
| 9. | Mystery Girl | Roy Orbison | 1 | 4 |
| 10. | A New Flame | Simply Red | 2 | |
| 11. | Appetite for Destruction | Guns N' Roses | 7 | |
| 12. | Sunshine on Leith | The Proclaimers | 2 | |
| 13. | Repeat Offender | Richard Marx | 1 | 7 |
| 14. | Hold On to Me | The Black Sorrows | 7 | |
| 15. | The Premiere Collection: The Best of Andrew Lloyd Webber | Various Artists | 1 | 1 |
| 16. | Melissa Etheridge | Melissa Etheridge | 3 | |
| 17. | Look Sharp! | Roxette | 2 | |
| 18. | Rattle and Hum | U2 | 1 | 5 (Note: Rattle and Hum debuted at #1 in November 1988 for five weeks and remained in the ARIA Top 50 until April 1989, it returned in August and reached #6 in October, overall it spent 51 weeks in the Top 50.) |
| 19. | Cocktail | Soundtrack | 1 | 5 |
| 20. | Brave | Kate Ceberano | 2 | |
| 21. | Gipsy Kings | Gipsy Kings | 2 | |
| 22. | Matchbook | Ian Moss | 1 | 3 |
| 23. | Phantom of the Opera | Soundtrack | 2 | |
| 24. | Heavy Nova | Robert Palmer | 2 | |
| 25. | Pop Art | Transvision Vamp | 13 | |
| 26. | Open Up and Say... Ahh! | Poison | 7 | |
| 27. | Big Daddy | John Cougar Mellencamp | 1 | 1 |
| 28. | Hangin' Tough | New Kids on the Block | 7 | |
| 29. | Watermark | Enya | 8 | |
| 30. | Shiver | Jenny Morris | 5 | |
| 31. | Greatest Hits | Fleetwood Mac | 3 | |
| 32. | Heart of Stone | Cher | 1 | 1 |
| 33. | Warragul | John Williamson | 1 | 1 |
| 34. | Hard Reyne | James Reyne | 7 | |
| 35. | Union | Toni Childs | 8 | |
| 36. | G N' R Lies | Guns N' Roses | 18 | |
| 37. | Electric Youth | Debbie Gibson | 10 | |
| 38. | Barnestorming | Jimmy Barnes | 1 | 3 |
| 39. | Velveteen | Transvision Vamp | 2 | |
| 40. | The George Thorogood Collection | George Thorogood and the Destroyers | 2 | |
| 41. | Storm Front | Billy Joel | 1 | 2 |
| 42. | Living Years | Mike and the Mechanics | 10 | |
| 43. | Young Einstein | Soundtrack | 6 | |
| 44. | Everything | The Bangles | 7 | |
| 45. | Stop! | Sam Brown | 13 | |
| 46. | Tracy Chapman | Tracy Chapman | 2 | |
| 47. | The Other Side of the Mirror | Stevie Nicks | 8 | |
| 48. | Trash | Alice Cooper | 5 | |
| 49. | Batman | Prince | 4 | |
| 50. | Southside | Texas | 14 | |

Peak chart positions from early 1988 were calculated by David Kent for the Kent Music Report. Late 1988 and all 1989 peak chart positions are from the ARIA Charts. Overall position on the End of Year Chart is calculated by ARIA based on the number of weeks and position that the records reach within the Top 50 albums for each week during 1989.
