= List of top 25 albums for 1982 in Australia =

Top 25 albums of 1982 < 1981 1983 >

Other Australian top charts for 1982
- top 25 singles

Australian top 40 charts for the 1980s
- singles
- albums

Australian number-one charts of 1982
- albums
- singles

The following lists the top 25 (end of year) charting albums on the Australian Album Charts, for the year of 1982. These were the best charting albums in Australia for 1982. The source for this year is the "Kent Music Report", known from 1987 onwards as the "Australian Music Report".

#	Title	Artist	Highest pos. reached	Weeks at No. 1
1.	Business as Usual	Men at Work	1	9 (pkd #1 in 1981 & 82)
2.	Dare	The Human League	3	
3.	Chariots of Fire	Vangelis	5	
4.	Days of Innocence	Moving Pictures	1	7
5.	Avalon	Roxy Music	1	3
6.	Circus Animals	Cold Chisel	1	1
7.	Tug of War	Paul McCartney	2	
8.	Time and Tide	Split Enz	1	2
9.	Mirage	Fleetwood Mac	2	
10.	The Concert in Central Park	Simon & Garfunkel	5	
11.	Sons of Beaches	Australian Crawl	1	5
12.	Love Over Gold	Dire Straits	1	15 (pkd #1 in 1982 & 83)
13.	1982 with a Bullet	Various Artists	1	5
14.	The Best of Blondie	Blondie	1	2
15.	4	Foreigner	3	
16.	Duran Duran	Duran Duran	9	
17.	Footsteps in the Dark: Greatest Hits, Vol. 2	Cat Stevens	3	
18.	Primitive Man	Icehouse	3	
19.	Eye in the Sky	The Alan Parsons Project	4	
20.	Tattoo You	Rolling Stones	1	11 (pkd #1 in 1981)
21.	Physical	Olivia Newton-John	3	
22.	Night and Day	Joe Jackson	5	
23.	Greatest Hits	Queen	2	
24.	Rio	Duran Duran	1	1
25.	Jump Up!	Elton John	3	

These charts are calculated by David Kent of the Kent Music Report and they are based on the number of weeks and position the records reach within the top 100 albums for each week.
