= List of top 25 albums for 1985 in Australia =

Top 25 albums of 1985 < 1984 1986 >

Other Australian top charts for 1985
- top 25 singles

Australian top 40 charts for the 1980s
- singles
- albums

Australian number-one charts of 1985
- albums
- singles

The following lists the top 25 (end of year) charting albums on the Australian Album Charts, for the year of 1985. These were the best charting albums in Australia for 1985. The source for this year is the "Kent Music Report", known from 1987 onwards as the "Australian Music Report".

#	Title	Artist	Highest pos. reached	Weeks at No. 1
1.	Brothers in Arms	Dire Straits	1	34 (pkd #1 in 1985 & 86)
2.	Born in the USA	Bruce Springsteen	1	7 (pkd #1 in 1984)
3.	Like a Virgin	Madonna	2	
4.	No Jacket Required	Phil Collins	1	3
5.	Be Yourself Tonight	Eurythmics	1	4
6.	Songs from the Big Chair	Tears for Fears	5	
7.	Little Creatures	Talking Heads	2	
8.	She's So Unusual	Cyndi Lauper	3	
9.	Reckless	Bryan Adams	2	
10.	Stop Making Sense	Talking Heads	9	
11.	Fundamental	Mental As Anything	3	
12.	Can't Slow Down	Lionel Richie	1	3 (pkd #1 in 1984)
13.	Greatest Hits vols 1 & 2	Billy Joel	2	
14.	Mars Needs Guitars!	Hoodoo Gurus	5	
15.	'Cos Life Hurts	Uncanny X-Men	3	
16.	Shine	Kids in the Kitchen	9	
17.	Out of Mind, Out of Sight	The Models	3	
18.	The Dream of the Blue Turtles	Sting	1	3
19.	Dekadance	INXS	2	
20.	Make It Big	Wham!	1	2
21.	Red Sails in the Sunset	Midnight Oil	1	4 (pkd #1 in 1984)
22.	Listen Like Thieves	INXS	1	2
23.	Agent Provocateur	Foreigner	2	
24.	1985 Comes Alive	Various Artists	1	4
25.	Our Favourite Shop	The Style Council	5	

These charts are calculated by David Kent of the Kent Music Report and they are based on the number of weeks and position the records reach within the top 100 albums for each week.

source: David Kent's "Australian Chart Book 1970-1992"
