= List of number-one albums in Australia during the 1980s =

Australian number-one albums of the 1980s < 1970s 1990s >

Triple J Hottest 100
- 1989

Australian top 25 singles
- 1980 1981 1982 1983 1984; 1985 1986 1987 1988 1989

Australian top 25 albums
- 1980 1981 1982 1983 1984; 1985 1986 1987 1988 1989

Australian top 40 charts
- singles
- albums

The following lists the number one albums on the Australian Albums Chart, during the 1980s. The source for this decade is the Kent Music Report up until 20 June 1988, whereafter the source is the ARIA Charts.

Key
The yellow background indicates the #1 album on the KMR/ARIA End of Year Chart
The light blue background indicates the #1 album on the KMR/ARIA End of Decade Chart

== 1980 ==
Date	Artist	Album	Weeks at number one
7 January	Electric Light Orchestra	ELO's Greatest Hits	4 weeks
14 January	Electric Light Orchestra	ELO's Greatest Hits	4 weeks
21 January	Electric Light Orchestra	ELO's Greatest Hits	4 weeks
28 January	Electric Light Orchestra	ELO's Greatest Hits	4 weeks
4 February	Creedence Clearwater Revival	20 Golden Greats	2 weeks
11 February	Creedence Clearwater Revival	20 Golden Greats	2 weeks
18 February	The Police	Reggatta de Blanc	2 weeks
25 February	The Police	Reggatta de Blanc	2 weeks
3 March	Pink Floyd	The Wall	4 weeks
10 March	Pink Floyd	The Wall	4 weeks
17 March	Pink Floyd	The Wall	4 weeks
24 March	Pink Floyd	The Wall	4 weeks
31 March	Michael Jackson	Off the Wall	2 weeks
7 April	Michael Jackson	Off the Wall	2 weeks
14 April	Split Enz	True Colours	10 weeks
21 April	Split Enz	True Colours	10 weeks
28 April	Split Enz	True Colours	10 weeks
5 May	Split Enz	True Colours	10 weeks
12 May	Split Enz	True Colours	10 weeks
19 May	Split Enz	True Colours	10 weeks
26 May	Split Enz	True Colours	10 weeks
2 June	Split Enz	True Colours	10 weeks
9 June	Split Enz	True Colours	10 weeks
16 June	Split Enz	True Colours	10 weeks
23 June	Village People	Can't Stop the Music	9 weeks
30 June	Village People	Can't Stop the Music	9 weeks
7 July	Village People	Can't Stop the Music	9 weeks
14 July	Village People	Can't Stop the Music	9 weeks
21 July	Village People	Can't Stop the Music	9 weeks
28 July	Village People	Can't Stop the Music	9 weeks
4 August	Village People	Can't Stop the Music	9 weeks
11 August	Village People	Can't Stop the Music	9 weeks
18 August	Village People	Can't Stop the Music	9 weeks
25 August	Olivia Newton-John and the Electric Light Orchestra	Xanadu	6 weeks
1 September	Olivia Newton-John and the Electric Light Orchestra	Xanadu	6 weeks
8 September	Olivia Newton-John and the Electric Light Orchestra	Xanadu	6 weeks
15 September	Olivia Newton-John and the Electric Light Orchestra	Xanadu	6 weeks
22 September	Olivia Newton-John and the Electric Light Orchestra	Xanadu	6 weeks
29 September	Olivia Newton-John and the Electric Light Orchestra	Xanadu	6 weeks
6 October	David Bowie	Scary Monsters (And Super Creeps)	5 weeks
13 October	David Bowie	Scary Monsters (And Super Creeps)	5 weeks
20 October	David Bowie	Scary Monsters (And Super Creeps)	5 weeks
27 October	David Bowie	Scary Monsters (And Super Creeps)	5 weeks
3 November	David Bowie	Scary Monsters (And Super Creeps)	5 weeks
10 November	Barbra Streisand	Guilty	6 weeks
17 November	Barbra Streisand	Guilty	6 weeks
24 November	Barbra Streisand	Guilty	6 weeks
1 December	Barbra Streisand	Guilty	6 weeks
8 December	Barbra Streisand	Guilty	6 weeks
15 December	Barbra Streisand	Guilty	6 weeks
22 December	John Lennon and Yoko Ono	Double Fantasy	10 weeks
29 December	John Lennon and Yoko Ono	Double Fantasy	10 weeks

== 1981 ==
Date	Artist	Album	Weeks at number one
5 January	John Lennon and Yoko Ono	Double Fantasy	10 weeks
12 January	John Lennon and Yoko Ono	Double Fantasy	10 weeks
19 January	John Lennon and Yoko Ono	Double Fantasy	10 weeks
26 January	John Lennon and Yoko Ono	Double Fantasy	10 weeks
2 February	John Lennon and Yoko Ono	Double Fantasy	10 weeks
9 February	John Lennon and Yoko Ono	Double Fantasy	10 weeks
16 February	John Lennon and Yoko Ono	Double Fantasy	10 weeks
23 February	John Lennon and Yoko Ono	Double Fantasy	10 weeks
2 March	The Police	Zenyatta Mondatta	1 week
9 March	AC/DC	Back in Black	1 week
16 March	Dr. Hook & The Medicine Show	Greatest Hits	4 weeks
23 March	Dr. Hook & The Medicine Show	Greatest Hits	4 weeks
30 March	Dr. Hook & The Medicine Show	Greatest Hits	4 weeks
6 April	Dr. Hook & The Medicine Show	Greatest Hits	4 weeks
13 April	Cold Chisel	Swingshift	2 weeks
20 April	Cold Chisel	Swingshift	2 weeks
27 April	Split Enz	Corroboree	3 weeks
4 May	Split Enz	Corroboree	3 weeks
11 May	Split Enz	Corroboree	3 weeks
18 May	The Beatles	The Beatles Ballads	7 weeks
25 May	The Beatles	The Beatles Ballads	7 weeks
1 June	The Beatles	The Beatles Ballads	7 weeks
8 June	The Beatles	The Beatles Ballads	7 weeks
15 June	The Beatles	The Beatles Ballads	7 weeks
22 June	The Beatles	The Beatles Ballads	7 weeks
29 June	The Beatles	The Beatles Ballads	7 weeks
6 July	Billy Field	Bad Habits	2 weeks
13 July	Billy Field	Bad Habits	2 weeks
20 July	Stars on 45	Long Play Album	2 weeks
27 July	Stars on 45	Long Play Album	2 weeks
3 August	Australian Crawl	Sirocco	6 weeks
10 August	Australian Crawl	Sirocco	6 weeks
17 August	Australian Crawl	Sirocco	6 weeks
24 August	Australian Crawl	Sirocco	6 weeks
31 August	Australian Crawl	Sirocco	6 weeks
7 September	Australian Crawl	Sirocco	6 weeks
14 September	Various artists	Hitwave '81	1 week
21 September	Stevie Nicks	Bella Donna	1 week
28 September	The Rolling Stones	Tattoo You	11 weeks
5 October	The Rolling Stones	Tattoo You	11 weeks
12 October	The Rolling Stones	Tattoo You	11 weeks
19 October	The Rolling Stones	Tattoo You	11 weeks
26 October	The Rolling Stones	Tattoo You	11 weeks
2 November	The Rolling Stones	Tattoo You	11 weeks
9 November	The Rolling Stones	Tattoo You	11 weeks
16 November	The Rolling Stones	Tattoo You	11 weeks
23 November	The Rolling Stones	Tattoo You	11 weeks
30 November	The Rolling Stones	Tattoo You	11 weeks
7 December	The Rolling Stones	Tattoo You	11 weeks
14 December	The Police	Ghost in the Machine	1 week
21 December	Men at Work	Business as Usual	9 weeks
28 December	Men at Work	Business as Usual	9 weeks

== 1982 ==
Date	Artist	Album	Weeks at number one
4 January	Men at Work	Business as Usual	9 weeks
11 January	Men at Work	Business as Usual	9 weeks
18 January	Men at Work	Business as Usual	9 weeks
24 January	Men at Work	Business as Usual	9 weeks
1 February	Blondie	The Best of Blondie	2 weeks
8 February	Blondie	The Best of Blondie	2 weeks
15 February	Men at Work	Business as Usual	9 weeks
22 February	Men at Work	Business as Usual	9 weeks
1 March	Men at Work	Business as Usual	9 weeks
8 March	Cliff Richard	Love Songs	2 weeks
15 March	Cliff Richard	Love Songs	2 weeks
22 March	Moving Pictures	Days of Innocence	7 weeks
29 March	Moving Pictures	Days of Innocence	7 weeks
5 April	Moving Pictures	Days of Innocence	7 weeks
12 April	Moving Pictures	Days of Innocence	7 weeks
19 April	Moving Pictures	Days of Innocence	7 weeks
26 April	Moving Pictures	Days of Innocence	7 weeks
3 May	Moving Pictures	Days of Innocence	7 weeks
10 May	Cold Chisel	Circus Animals	1 week
17 May	Various Artists	1982 with a Bullet	5 weeks
24 May	Various Artists	1982 with a Bullet	5 weeks
31 May	Various Artists	1982 with a Bullet	5 weeks
7 June	Various Artists	1982 with a Bullet	5 weeks
14 June	Various Artists	1982 with a Bullet	5 weeks
21 June	Split Enz	Time and Tide	2 weeks
28 June	Split Enz	Time and Tide	2 weeks
5 July	Duran Duran	Rio	1 week
12 July	Roxy Music	Avalon	3 weeks
19 July	Roxy Music	Avalon	3 weeks
26 July	Roxy Music	Avalon	3 weeks
2 August	Australian Crawl	Sons of Beaches	5 weeks
9 August	Australian Crawl	Sons of Beaches	5 weeks
16 August	Australian Crawl	Sons of Beaches	5 weeks
23 August	Australian Crawl	Sons of Beaches	5 weeks
30 August	Australian Crawl	Sons of Beaches	5 weeks
6 September	Various Artists	1982 Out of the Blue	5 weeks
13 September	Various Artists	1982 Out of the Blue	5 weeks
20 September	Various Artists	1982 Out of the Blue	5 weeks
27 September	Various Artists	1982 Out of the Blue	5 weeks
4 October	Various Artists	1982 Out of the Blue	5 weeks
11 October	Dire Straits	Love over Gold	15 weeks
18 October	Dire Straits	Love over Gold	15 weeks
25 October	Dire Straits	Love over Gold	15 weeks
1 November	Dire Straits	Love over Gold	15 weeks
8 November	Dire Straits	Love over Gold	15 weeks
15 November	Dire Straits	Love over Gold	15 weeks
22 November	Dire Straits	Love over Gold	15 weeks
29 November	Dire Straits	Love over Gold	15 weeks
6 December	Dire Straits	Love over Gold	15 weeks
13 December	Dire Straits	Love over Gold	15 weeks
20 December	Dire Straits	Love over Gold	15 weeks
27 December	Dire Straits	Love over Gold	15 weeks

== 1983 ==
Date	Artist	Album	Weeks at number one
3 January	Dire Straits	Love over Gold	15 weeks
10 January	Dire Straits	Love over Gold	15 weeks
17 January	John Lennon	The John Lennon Collection	5 weeks
24 January	John Lennon	The John Lennon Collection	5 weeks
31 January	John Lennon	The John Lennon Collection	5 weeks
7 February	John Lennon	The John Lennon Collection	5 weeks
14 February	John Lennon	The John Lennon Collection	5 weeks
21 February	The Carpenters	The Very Best of the Carpenters	1 week
28 February	Olivia Newton-John	Greatest Hits Vol 3	2 weeks
7 March	Olivia Newton-John	Greatest Hits Vol 3	2 weeks
14 March	Cliff Richard	25 Years of Gold	3 weeks
21 March	Cliff Richard	25 Years of Gold	3 weeks
28 March	Cliff Richard	25 Years of Gold	3 weeks
4 April	Toto	IV	1 week
11 April	Dire Straits	Love over Gold	15 weeks
18 April	Various Artists	Go for It 1983	1 week
25 April	David Bowie	Let's Dance	1 week
2 May	Men at Work	Cargo	2 weeks
9 May	Men at Work	Cargo	2 weeks
16 May	Various Artists	1983 The Hot Ones	4 weeks
23 May	Various Artists	1983 The Hot Ones	4 weeks
30 May	Various Artists	1983 The Hot Ones	4 weeks
6 June	Various Artists	1983 The Hot Ones	4 weeks
13 June	Michael Jackson	Thriller	11 weeks
20 June	The Beatles	The Number Ones	1 week
27 June	Michael Jackson	Thriller	11 weeks
4 July	Michael Jackson	Thriller	11 weeks
11 July	The Police	Synchronicity	3 weeks
18 July	The Police	Synchronicity	3 weeks
25 July	The Police	Synchronicity	3 weeks
1 August	Various Artists	Keep On Dancing	3 weeks
8 August	Various Artists	Keep On Dancing	3 weeks
15 August	Various Artists	Keep On Dancing	3 weeks
22 August	Original Soundtrack	Flashdance	3 weeks
29 August	Original Soundtrack	Flashdance	3 weeks
5 September	Original Soundtrack	Flashdance	3 weeks
12 September	Various Artists	The Breakers '83	2 weeks
19 September	Various Artists	The Breakers '83	2 weeks
26 September	Air Supply	Greatest Hits	1 week
3 October	Joe Cocker	The Best of Joe Cocker	3 weeks
10 October	Joe Cocker	The Best of Joe Cocker	3 weeks
17 October	Joe Cocker	The Best of Joe Cocker	3 weeks
24 October	Culture Club	Colour by Numbers	7 weeks
31 October	Culture Club	Colour by Numbers	7 weeks
7 November	Culture Club	Colour by Numbers	7 weeks
14 November	Culture Club	Colour by Numbers	7 weeks
21 November	Culture Club	Colour by Numbers	7 weeks
28 November	Various Artists	1983 ... Summer Breaks	3 weeks
5 December	Various Artists	1983 ... Summer Breaks	3 weeks
12 December	Various Artists	1983 ... Summer Breaks	3 weeks
19 December	Various Artists	Thru the Roof '83	5 weeks
26 December	Various Artists	Thru the Roof '83	5 weeks

== 1984 ==
Date	Artist	Album	Weeks at number one
2 January	Various Artists	Thru the Roof '83	5 weeks
9 January	Various Artists	Thru the Roof '83	5 weeks
16 January	Various Artists	Thru the Roof '83	5 weeks
23 January	Michael Jackson	Thriller	11 weeks
30 January	Michael Jackson	Thriller	11 weeks
6 February	Michael Jackson	Thriller	11 weeks
13 February	Michael Jackson	Thriller	11 weeks
20 February	Michael Jackson	Thriller	11 weeks
27 February	Michael Jackson	Thriller	11 weeks
5 March	Various Artists	1984 Shakin'	2 weeks
12 March	Various Artists	1984 Shakin'	2 weeks
19 March	Michael Jackson	Thriller	11 weeks
26 March	Michael Jackson	Thriller	11 weeks
2 April	INXS	The Swing	5 weeks
9 April	INXS	The Swing	5 weeks
16 April	INXS	The Swing	5 weeks
23 April	Cold Chisel	Twentieth Century	1 week
30 April	INXS	The Swing	5 weeks
7 May	INXS	The Swing	5 weeks
14 May	Various Artists	Throbbin' '84	5 weeks
21 May	Various Artists	Throbbin' '84	5 weeks
28 May	Various Artists	Throbbin' '84	5 weeks
4 June	Various Artists	Throbbin' '84	5 weeks
11 June	Various Artists	Throbbin' '84	5 weeks
18 June	Lionel Richie	Can't Slow Down	3 weeks
25 June	Lionel Richie	Can't Slow Down	3 weeks
2 July	Lionel Richie	Can't Slow Down	3 weeks
9 July	Elton John	Breaking Hearts	3 weeks
16 July	Elton John	Breaking Hearts	3 weeks
23 July	Elton John	Breaking Hearts	3 weeks
30 July	Culture Club	Colour by Numbers	7 weeks
6 August	Culture Club	Colour by Numbers	7 weeks
13 August	Soundtrack / Prince	Purple Rain	1 week
20 August	Rodney Rude	Rodney Rude	2 weeks
27 August	Rodney Rude	Rodney Rude	2 weeks
3 September	Various Artists	H'its Huge '84	5 weeks
10 September	Various Artists	H'its Huge '84	5 weeks
17 September	Various Artists	H'its Huge '84	5 weeks
24 September	Various Artists	H'its Huge '84	5 weeks
1 October	Various Artists	H'its Huge '84	5 weeks
8 October	Jimmy Barnes	Bodyswerve	2 weeks
15 October	Jimmy Barnes	Bodyswerve	2 weeks
22 October	Bruce Springsteen	Born in the USA	8 weeks
29 October	U2	The Unforgettable Fire	1 week
5 November	Midnight Oil	Red Sails in the Sunset	4 weeks
14 November	Midnight Oil	Red Sails in the Sunset	4 weeks
19 November	Midnight Oil	Red Sails in the Sunset	4 weeks
26 November	Midnight Oil	Red Sails in the Sunset	4 weeks
3 December	Various Artists	Choose 1985	9 weeks
10 December	Various Artists	Choose 1985	9 weeks
17 December	Various Artists	Choose 1985	9 weeks
24 December	Various Artists	Choose 1985	9 weeks
31 December	Various Artists	Choose 1985	9 weeks

== 1985 ==
Date	Artist	Album	Weeks at number one
7 January	Various Artists	Choose 1985	9 weeks
14 January	Various Artists	Choose 1985	9 weeks
21 January	Various Artists	Choose 1985	9 weeks
28 January	Various Artists	Choose 1985	9 weeks
4 February	Wham!	Make It Big	2 weeks
11 February	Wham!	Make It Big	2 weeks
18 February	Bruce Springsteen	Born in the USA	8 weeks
25 February	Bruce Springsteen	Born in the USA	8 weeks
4 March	Various Artists	1985 Comes Alive	4 weeks
11 March	Various Artists	1985 Comes Alive	4 weeks
18 March	Various Artists	1985 Comes Alive	4 weeks
25 March	Various Artists	1985 Comes Alive	4 weeks
1 April	Bruce Springsteen	Born in the USA	8 weeks
8 April	Bruce Springsteen	Born in the USA	8 weeks
15 April	Bruce Springsteen	Born in the USA	8 weeks
22 April	Bruce Springsteen	Born in the USA	8 weeks
29 April	Bruce Springsteen	Born in the USA	8 weeks
6 May	Phil Collins	No Jacket Required	3 weeks
13 May	Phil Collins	No Jacket Required	3 weeks
20 May	Phil Collins	No Jacket Required	3 weeks
27 May	Dire Straits	Brothers in Arms	34 weeks
3 June	Dire Straits	Brothers in Arms	34 weeks
10 June	Dire Straits	Brothers in Arms	34 weeks
17 June	Dire Straits	Brothers in Arms	34 weeks
24 June	Dire Straits	Brothers in Arms	34 weeks
1 July	Eurythmics	Be Yourself Tonight	4 weeks
8 July	Eurythmics	Be Yourself Tonight	4 weeks
15 July	Eurythmics	Be Yourself Tonight	4 weeks
22 July	Eurythmics	Be Yourself Tonight	4 weeks
29 July	Dire Straits	Brothers in Arms	34 weeks
5 August	Dire Straits	Brothers in Arms	34 weeks
12 August	Dire Straits	Brothers in Arms	34 weeks
19 August	Dire Straits	Brothers in Arms	34 weeks
26 August	Dire Straits	Brothers in Arms	34 weeks
2 September	Dire Straits	Brothers in Arms	34 weeks
9 September	Dire Straits	Brothers in Arms	34 weeks
16 September	Dire Straits	Brothers in Arms	34 weeks
23 September	Dire Straits	Brothers in Arms	34 weeks
30 September	Dire Straits	Brothers in Arms	34 weeks
7 October	Dire Straits	Brothers in Arms	34 weeks
14 October	INXS	Listen Like Thieves	2 weeks
21 October	INXS	Listen Like Thieves	2 weeks
28 October	Dire Straits	Brothers in Arms	34 weeks
4 November	Dire Straits	Brothers in Arms	34 weeks
11 November	Dire Straits	Brothers in Arms	34 weeks
18 November	Dire Straits	Brothers in Arms	34 weeks
25 November	Dire Straits	Brothers in Arms	34 weeks
2 December	Dire Straits	Brothers in Arms	34 weeks
9 December	Dire Straits	Brothers in Arms	34 weeks
16 December	Jimmy Barnes	For the Working Class Man	7 weeks
23 December	Jimmy Barnes	For the Working Class Man	7 weeks
30 December	Jimmy Barnes	For the Working Class Man	7 weeks

== 1986 ==
Date	Artist	Album	Weeks at number one
6 January	Jimmy Barnes	For the Working Class Man	7 weeks
13 January	Jimmy Barnes	For the Working Class Man	7 weeks
20 January	Jimmy Barnes	For the Working Class Man	7 weeks
27 January	Jimmy Barnes	For the Working Class Man	7 weeks
3 February	Dire Straits	Brothers in Arms	34 weeks
10 February	Dire Straits	Brothers in Arms	34 weeks
17 February	Dire Straits	Brothers in Arms	34 weeks
24 February	Dire Straits	Brothers in Arms	34 weeks
3 March	Dire Straits	Brothers in Arms	34 weeks
10 March	Dire Straits	Brothers in Arms	34 weeks
17 March	Dire Straits	Brothers in Arms	34 weeks
24 March	Dire Straits	Brothers in Arms	34 weeks
31 March	Dire Straits	Brothers in Arms	34 weeks
7 April	Dire Straits	Brothers in Arms	34 weeks
14 April	Dire Straits	Brothers in Arms	34 weeks
21 April	Sting	The Dream of the Blue Turtles	3 weeks
28 April	Sting	The Dream of the Blue Turtles	3 weeks
5 May	Sting	The Dream of the Blue Turtles	3 weeks
12 May	Various Artists	1986 Way to Go	3 weeks
19 May	Various Artists	1986 Way to Go	3 weeks
26 May	Various Artists	1986 Way to Go	3 weeks
2 June	Whitney Houston	Whitney Houston	11 weeks
9 June	Whitney Houston	Whitney Houston	11 weeks
16 June	Whitney Houston	Whitney Houston	11 weeks
23 June	Whitney Houston	Whitney Houston	11 weeks
30 June	Whitney Houston	Whitney Houston	11 weeks
7 July	Whitney Houston	Whitney Houston	11 weeks
14 July	Whitney Houston	Whitney Houston	11 weeks
21 July	Whitney Houston	Whitney Houston	11 weeks
28 July	Whitney Houston	Whitney Houston	11 weeks
4 August	Madonna	True Blue	2 weeks
11 August	Madonna	True Blue	2 weeks
18 August	Whitney Houston	Whitney Houston	11 weeks
25 August	Whitney Houston	Whitney Houston	11 weeks
1 September	Various Artists	1986 Just for Kicks	4 weeks
8 September	Various Artists	1986 Just for Kicks	4 weeks
15 September	Various Artists	1986 Just for Kicks	4 weeks
22 September	Various Artists	1986 Just for Kicks	4 weeks
29 September	Cyndi Lauper	True Colors	4 weeks
6 October	Cyndi Lauper	True Colors	4 weeks
13 October	Cyndi Lauper	True Colors	4 weeks
20 October	Cyndi Lauper	True Colors	4 weeks
27 October	Paul Simon	Graceland	5 weeks
3 November	Paul Simon	Graceland	5 weeks
10 November	Paul Simon	Graceland	5 weeks
17 November	John Farnham	Whispering Jack	25 weeks
24 November	John Farnham	Whispering Jack	25 weeks
1 December	John Farnham	Whispering Jack	25 weeks
8 December	John Farnham	Whispering Jack	25 weeks
15 December	John Farnham	Whispering Jack	25 weeks
22 December	John Farnham	Whispering Jack	25 weeks
29 December	John Farnham	Whispering Jack	25 weeks

== 1987 ==
Date	Artist	Album	Weeks at number one
5 January	John Farnham	Whispering Jack	25 weeks
12 January	Various Artists	Summer '87	2 weeks
19 January	Various Artists	Summer '87	2 weeks
26 January	John Farnham	Whispering Jack	25 weeks
2 February	John Farnham	Whispering Jack	25 weeks
9 February	John Farnham	Whispering Jack	25 weeks
16 February	John Farnham	Whispering Jack	25 weeks
23 February	John Farnham	Whispering Jack	25 weeks
2 March	John Farnham	Whispering Jack	25 weeks
9 March	John Farnham	Whispering Jack	25 weeks
16 March	John Farnham	Whispering Jack	25 weeks
23 March	John Farnham	Whispering Jack	25 weeks
30 March	John Farnham	Whispering Jack	25 weeks
6 April	Paul Simon	Graceland	5 weeks
13 April	Paul Simon	Graceland	5 weeks
20 April	John Farnham	Whispering Jack	25 weeks
27 April	John Farnham	Whispering Jack	25 weeks
4 May	Various Artists	87 Hits Out	1 week
11 May	John Farnham	Whispering Jack	25 weeks
18 May	John Farnham	Whispering Jack	25 weeks
25 May	John Farnham	Whispering Jack	25 weeks
1 June	John Farnham	Whispering Jack	25 weeks
8 June	Crowded House	Crowded House	1 week
15 June	John Farnham	Whispering Jack	25 weeks
22 June	Whitney Houston	Whitney	3 weeks
29 June	Whitney Houston	Whitney	3 weeks
6 July	Whitney Houston	Whitney	3 weeks
13 July	Bon Jovi	Slippery When Wet	6 weeks
20 July	Bon Jovi	Slippery When Wet	6 weeks
27 July	Bon Jovi	Slippery When Wet	6 weeks
3 August	Bon Jovi	Slippery When Wet	6 weeks
10 August	Bon Jovi	Slippery When Wet	6 weeks
17 August	Bon Jovi	Slippery When Wet	6 weeks
24 August	Midnight Oil	Diesel and Dust	6 weeks
31 August	Midnight Oil	Diesel and Dust	6 weeks
7 September	Midnight Oil	Diesel and Dust	6 weeks
14 September	Midnight Oil	Diesel and Dust	6 weeks
21 September	Midnight Oil	Diesel and Dust	6 weeks
28 September	Midnight Oil	Diesel and Dust	6 weeks
5 October	Icehouse	Man of Colours	11 weeks
12 October	Icehouse	Man of Colours	11 weeks
19 October	Icehouse	Man of Colours	11 weeks
26 October	Icehouse	Man of Colours	11 weeks
2 November	Icehouse	Man of Colours	11 weeks
9 November	Icehouse	Man of Colours	11 weeks
16 November	Icehouse	Man of Colours	11 weeks
23 November	Icehouse	Man of Colours	11 weeks
30 November	Icehouse	Man of Colours	11 weeks
7 December	Icehouse	Man of Colours	11 weeks
14 December	Icehouse	Man of Colours	11 weeks
21 December	Jimmy Barnes	Freight Train Heart	5 weeks
28 December	Jimmy Barnes	Freight Train Heart	5 weeks

== 1988 ==
Date	Artist	Album	Weeks at number one
4 January	Jimmy Barnes	Freight Train Heart	5 weeks
11 January	Jimmy Barnes	Freight Train Heart	5 weeks
18 January	Jimmy Barnes	Freight Train Heart	5 weeks
25 January	The Twelfth Man	Wired World of Sports	3 weeks
1 February	The Twelfth Man	Wired World of Sports	3 weeks
8 February	The Twelfth Man	Wired World of Sports	3 weeks
15 February	Soundtrack	Dirty Dancing	8 weeks
22 February	Soundtrack	Dirty Dancing	8 weeks
29 February	Soundtrack	Dirty Dancing	8 weeks
7 March	Soundtrack	Dirty Dancing	8 weeks
14 March	Soundtrack	Dirty Dancing	8 weeks
21 March	Soundtrack	Dirty Dancing	8 weeks
28 March	Soundtrack	Dirty Dancing	8 weeks
4 April	Soundtrack	Dirty Dancing	8 weeks
11 April	Rick Astley	Whenever You Need Somebody	1 week
18 April	Various Artists	Hit Pix '88	2 weeks
25 April	Various Artists	Hit Pix '88	2 weeks
2 May	Terence Trent D'Arby	Introducing the Hardline According to Terence Trent D'Arby	5 weeks
9 May	Terence Trent D'Arby	Introducing the Hardline According to Terence Trent D'Arby	5 weeks
16 May	Terence Trent D'Arby	Introducing the Hardline According to Terence Trent D'Arby	5 weeks
23 May	Terence Trent D'Arby	Introducing the Hardline According to Terence Trent D'Arby	5 weeks
30 May	Terence Trent D'Arby	Introducing the Hardline According to Terence Trent D'Arby	5 weeks
6 June	Soundtrack	Good Morning, Vietnam	2 weeks
13 June	Soundtrack	Good Morning, Vietnam	2 weeks
20 June	Bananarama	Wow!	1 week
27 June	Various Artists	'88 Kix On	4 weeks
4 July	Various Artists	'88 Kix On	4 weeks
11 July	Various Artists	'88 Kix On	4 weeks
18 July	Various Artists	'88 Kix On	4 weeks
25 July	Crowded House	Temple of Low Men	1 week
1 August	John Farnham	Age of Reason	8 weeks
8 August	John Farnham	Age of Reason	8 weeks
15 August	John Farnham	Age of Reason	8 weeks
22 August	John Farnham	Age of Reason	8 weeks
29 August	John Farnham	Age of Reason	8 weeks
5 September	John Farnham	Age of Reason	8 weeks
12 September	John Farnham	Age of Reason	8 weeks
19 September	John Farnham	Age of Reason	8 weeks
26 September	Various Artists	88 the Winners	4 weeks
3 October	Various Artists	88 the Winners	4 weeks
10 October	Various Artists	88 the Winners	4 weeks
17 October	Bon Jovi	New Jersey	1 week
24 October	Various Artists	88 the Winners	4 weeks
31 October	U2	Rattle and Hum	5 weeks
7 November	U2	Rattle and Hum	5 weeks
14 November	U2	Rattle and Hum	5 weeks
21 November	U2	Rattle and Hum	5 weeks
28 November	U2	Rattle and Hum	5 weeks
5 December	Jimmy Barnes	Barnestorming	3 weeks
12 December	Jimmy Barnes	Barnestorming	3 weeks
19 December	Jimmy Barnes	Barnestorming	3 weeks
26 December	Various Artists	Summer '89	2 weeks

== 1989 ==
Date	Artist	Album	Weeks at number one
2 January	Various artists	Summer '89	2 weeks
9 January	Soundtrack by various artists	Cocktail	5 weeks
16 January	Soundtrack by various artists	Cocktail	5 weeks
23 January	Soundtrack by various artists	Cocktail	5 weeks
30 January	Soundtrack by various artists	Cocktail	5 weeks
6 February	Soundtrack by various artists	Cocktail	5 weeks
13 February	Traveling Wilburys	Traveling Wilburys Vol. 1	2 weeks
20 February	Traveling Wilburys	Traveling Wilburys Vol. 1	2 weeks
27 February	Roy Orbison	Mystery Girl	4 weeks
6 March	Roy Orbison	Mystery Girl	4 weeks
13 March	Roy Orbison	Mystery Girl	4 weeks
20 March	Roy Orbison	Mystery Girl	4 weeks
27 March	Various artists	Hits of '89 Volume 1	5 weeks
3 April	Various artists	Hits of '89 Volume 1	5 weeks
10 April	Various artists	Hits of '89 Volume 1	5 weeks
17 April	Various artists	Hits of '89 Volume 1	5 weeks
24 April	Various artists	Hits of '89 Volume 1	5 weeks
1 May	1927	...ish	3 weeks
8 May	1927	...ish	3 weeks
15 May	1927	...ish	3 weeks
22 May	Daryl Braithwaite	Edge	3 weeks
29 May	Daryl Braithwaite	Edge	3 weeks
5 June	Daryl Braithwaite	Edge	3 weeks
12 June	John Cougar Mellencamp	Big Daddy	1 week
19 June	Soundtrack by Bette Midler	Beaches	4 weeks
26 June	Soundtrack by Bette Midler	Beaches	4 weeks
3 July	Soundtrack by Bette Midler	Beaches	4 weeks
10 July	Fine Young Cannibals	The Raw and the Cooked	1 week
17 July	Soundtrack by Bette Midler	Beaches	4 weeks
24 July	Def Leppard	Hysteria	3 weeks
31 July	Def Leppard	Hysteria	3 weeks
7 August	Def Leppard	Hysteria	3 weeks
14 August	Ian Moss	Matchbook	3 weeks
21 August	Ian Moss	Matchbook	3 weeks
28 August	Ian Moss	Matchbook	3 weeks
4 September	Andrew Lloyd Webber	The Premiere Collection	1 week
11 September	Richard Marx	Repeat Offender	7 weeks
18 September	Richard Marx	Repeat Offender	7 weeks
25 September	Richard Marx	Repeat Offender	7 weeks
2 October	Richard Marx	Repeat Offender	7 weeks
9 October	Richard Marx	Repeat Offender	7 weeks
16 October	Richard Marx	Repeat Offender	7 weeks
23 October	Richard Marx	Repeat Offender	7 weeks
30 October	John Williamson	Warragul	1 week
6 November	Billy Joel	Storm Front	2 weeks
13 November	Billy Joel	Storm Front	2 weeks
20 November	Cher	Heart of Stone	1 week
27 November	Phil Collins	...But Seriously	3 weeks
4 December	Phil Collins	...But Seriously	3 weeks
11 December	Phil Collins	...But Seriously	3 weeks
18 December	Jive Bunny and the Mastermixers	Jive Bunny: The Album	4 weeks
25 December	Jive Bunny and the Mastermixers	Jive Bunny: The Album	4 weeks

== See also ==
- List of artists who reached number one on the Australian singles chart
- Music of Australia
- List of UK Albums Chart number ones of the 1980s
