= List of top 25 singles for 1986 in Australia =

Top 25 singles of 1986 < 1985 1987 >

Other Australian top charts for 1986
- top 25 albums

Australian top 40 charts for the 1980s
- singles
- albums

Australian number-one charts of 1986
- albums
- singles

The following lists the top 25 (end of year) charting singles on the Australian Singles Charts, for the year of 1986. These were the best charting singles in Australia for 1986. The source for this year is the Kent Music Report.

#	Title	Artist	Highest pos. reached	Weeks at No. 1
1.	"Chain Reaction"	Diana Ross	1	3
2.	"When the Going Gets Tough, the Tough Get Going"	Billy Ocean	1	6
3.	"Touch Me (I Want Your Body)"	Samantha Fox	1	3
4.	"Venus"	Bananarama	1	7
5.	"Stimulation"	Wa Wa Nee	2	
6.	"Take My Breath Away"	Berlin	2	
7.	"Living Doll"	Cliff Richard & The Young Ones	1	6
8.	"A Good Heart"	Feargal Sharkey	1	2
9.	"Papa Don't Preach"	Madonna	1	6
10.	"Addicted to Love"	Robert Palmer	1	2
11.	"We Built This City"	Starship	1	4
12.	"That's What Friends Are For"	Dionne Warwick	1	1
13.	"Stuck with You"	Huey Lewis and the News	2	
14.	"You're the Voice"	John Farnham	1	7
15.	"Dancing on the Ceiling"	Lionel Richie	2	
16.	"Manic Monday"	The Bangles	3	
17.	"Don't Leave Me This Way"	The Communards	2	
18.	"A Matter of Trust"	Billy Joel	3	
19.	"True Colours"	Cyndi Lauper	3	
20.	"Hit That Perfect Beat"	Bronski Beat	3	
21.	"You Can Call Me Al"	Paul Simon	2	
22.	"How Will I Know"	Whitney Houston	2	
23.	"Concrete and Clay"	Martin Plaza	2	
24.	"Lady in Red"	Chris de Burgh	3	
25.	"Kiss"	Prince & the Revolution	2	

These charts are calculated by David Kent of the Kent Music Report.
