= List of top 25 singles for 1982 in Australia =

Top 25 singles of 1982 < 1981 1983 >

Other Australian top charts for 1982
- top 25 albums

Australian top 40 charts for the 1980s
- singles
- albums

Australian number-one charts of 1982
- albums
- singles

The following lists the top 25 (end of year) charting singles on the Australian Singles Charts, for the year of 1982. These were the best charting singles in Australia for 1982. The source for this year is the "Kent Music Report".

#	Title	Artist	Highest pos. reached	Weeks at No. 1
1.	"Eye of the Tiger"	Survivor	1	6
2.	"What About Me"	Moving Pictures	1	6
3.	"Tainted Love"	Soft Cell	1	3
4.	"Centerfold"	The J. Geils Band	1	1
5.	"Key Largo"	Bertie Higgins	2	
6.	"Mickey"	Toni Basil	1	2
7.	"I Love Rock 'n' Roll"	Joan Jett and the Blackhearts	1	5
8.	"Trouble"	Lindsey Buckingham	1	3
9.	"Believe it or Not"	Joey Scarbury	2	
10.	"Hard to Say I'm Sorry"	Chicago	4	
11.	"I've Never Been to Me"	Charlene	1	6
12.	"Come On Eileen"	Dexys Midnight Runners	1	5
13.	"Abracadabra"	Steve Miller Band	1	2
14.	"If You Want My Love"	Cheap Trick	2	
15.	"I Ran (So Far Away)"	A Flock of Seagulls	1	2
16.	"Hurts So Good"	John Cougar	5	
17.	"Our Lips Are Sealed"	The Go-Go's	2	
18.	"Six Months in a Leaky Boat"	Split Enz	2	
19.	"Shy Boy"	Bananarama	2	
20.	"Ebony and Ivory"	Paul McCartney & Stevie Wonder	2	
21.	"Waiting for a Girl Like You"	Foreigner	3	
22.	"The Other Woman"	Ray Parker Jr.	1	1
23.	"Young Turks"	Rod Stewart	3	
24.	"Down Under"	Men at Work	1	6
25.	"You Should Hear How She Talks About You"	Melissa Manchester	4	

These charts are calculated by David Kent of the Kent Music Report.
