= List of top 25 singles for 1989 in Australia =

Top 25 singles of 1989 < 1988 1990 >

Other Australian top charts for 1989
- top 25 albums
- Triple J Hottest 100

Australian top 40 charts for the 1980s
- singles
- albums

Australian number-one charts of 1989
- albums
- singles

The following lists the top 100 singles of 1989 in Australia from the Australian Recording Industry Association (ARIA) End of Year Singles Chart. ARIA had previously used the Kent Music Report, known from 1987 onwards as the Australian Music Report.

| # | Title | Artist | Highest pos. reached | Weeks at No. 1 |
|---|---|---|---|---|
| 1. | "Like a Prayer" | Madonna | 1 | 5 |
| 2. | "The Look" | Roxette | 1 | 6 |
| 3. | "I'm Gonna Be (500 Miles)" | The Proclaimers | 1 | 5 |
| 4. | "Eternal Flame" | The Bangles | 1 | 3 |
| 5. | "If I Could Turn Back Time" | Cher | 1 | 7 |
| 6. | "She Drives Me Crazy" | Fine Young Cannibals | 1 | 3 |
| 7. | "Bedroom Eyes" | Kate Ceberano | 2 | |
| 8. | "You Got It (The Right Stuff)" | New Kids on the Block | 1 | 3 |
| 9. | "Kokomo" | The Beach Boys | 1 | 6 |
| 10. | "The Living Years" | Mike + The Mechanics | 1 | 1 |
| 11. | "Wind Beneath My Wings" | Bette Midler | 1 | 2 |
| 12. | "Teardrops" | Womack & Womack | 2 | |
| 13. | "If You Don't Know Me by Now" | Simply Red | 1 | 1 |
| 14. | "Right Here Waiting" | Richard Marx | 1 | 5 |
| 15. | "Tucker's Daughter" | Ian Moss | 2 | |
| 16. | "Swing the Mood" | Jive Bunny and the Mastermixers | 1 | 3 |
| 17. | "Especially for You" | Kylie and Jason | 2 | |
| 18. | "Poison" | Alice Cooper | 3 | |
| 19. | "Batdance" | Prince | 2 | |
| 20. | "Dressed for Success" | Roxette | 3 | |
| 21. | "If I Could" | 1927 | 4 | |
| 22. | "All I Want Is You / Everlasting Love" | U2 | 2 | |
| 23. | "You Got It" | Roy Orbison | 3 | |
| 24. | "Stop" | Sam Brown | 4 | |
| 25. | "Baby I Don't Care" | Transvision Vamp | 3 | |
| 26. | "Talk It Over" | Grayson Hugh | 4 | |
| 27. | "Lost in Your Eyes" | Debbie Gibson | 7 | |
| 28. | "Express Yourself" | Madonna | 5 | |
| 29. | "Ring My Bell" | Collette | 5 | |
| 30. | "Toy Soldiers" | Martika | 5 | |
| 31. | "Handle with Care" | Traveling Wilburys | 3 | |
| 32. | "I'll Be Loving You (Forever)" | New Kids on the Block | 4 | |
| 33. | "The Best" | Tina Turner | 4 | |
| 34. | "I Don't Want a Lover" | Texas | 4 | |
| 35. | "Stuck on You" | Paul Norton | 3 | |
| 36. | "I'm on My Way" | The Proclaimers | 3 | |
| 37. | "We Didn't Start the Fire" | Billy Joel | 2 | |
| 38. | "Funky Cold Medina" | Tone Loc | 8 | |
| 39. | "She Has to Be Loved" | Jenny Morris | 5 | |
| 40. | "Rock and Roll Music" | Mental As Anything | 5 | |
| 41. | "Wild Thing" | Tone Loc | 15 | |
| 42. | "Now You're in Heaven" | Julian Lennon | 5 | |
| 43. | "Orinoco Flow" | Enya | 6 | |
| 44. | "Right Back Where We Started From" | Sinitta | 7 | |
| 45. | "One Summer" | Daryl Braithwaite | 8 | |
| 46. | "Iko Iko" | The Belle Stars | 7 | |
| 47. | "Cherish" | Madonna | 4 | |
| 48. | "Kiss" | Art of Noise feat. Tom Jones | 8 | |
| 49. | "Hand on Your Heart" | Kylie Minogue | 4 | |
| 50. | "Chained to the Wheel" | The Black Sorrows | 9 | |
| 51. | "Soul Revival" | Johnny Diesel and the Injectors | 9 | |
| 52. | "She Makes My Day" | Robert Palmer | 9 | |
| 53. | "Good Thing" | Fine Young Cannibals | 7 | |
| 54. | "Don't Need Love" | Johnny Diesel and the Injectors | 10 | |
| 55. | "I Drove All Night" | Cyndi Lauper | 11 | |
| 56. | "Patience" | Guns N' Roses | 16 | |
| 57. | "Say Goodbye" | Indecent Obsession | 6 | |
| 58. | "Wait" | Gyan | 14 | |
| 59. | "Baby Don't Forget My Number" | Milli Vanilli | 17 | |
| 60. | "The Only Way Is Up" | Yazz and the Plastic Population | 2 | |
| 61. | "Healing Hands" | Elton John | 14 | |
| 62. | "Telephone Booth" | Ian Moss | 7 | |
| 63. | "I Want Your Love" | Transvision Vamp | 7 | |
| 64. | "Satisfied" | Richard Marx | 20 | |
| 65. | "Two Hearts" | Phil Collins | 13 | |
| 66. | "Belfast Child" | Simple Minds | 12 | |
| 67. | "I Feel the Earth Move" | Martika | 2 | |
| 68. | "Don't Worry, Be Happy" | Bobby McFerrin | 1 | 7 |
| 69. | "End of the Line" | Traveling Wilburys | 12 | |
| 70. | "Put a Little Love in Your Heart" | Annie Lennox and Al Green | 6 | |
| 71. | "I Want It All" | Queen | 10 | |
| 72. | "Cry In Shame" | Johnny Diesel and the Injectors | 10 | |
| 73. | "Way of the World" | Max Q | 8 | |
| 74. | "Listen to Your Heart" | Roxette | 10 | |
| 75. | "Hangin' Tough" | New Kids on the Block | 8 | |
| 76. | "Too Many Broken Hearts" | Jason Donovan | 7 | |
| 77. | "Like the Way I Do" | Melissa Etheridge | 16 | |
| 78. | "Onion Skin" | Boom Crash Opera | 11 | |
| 79. | "A Groovy Kind of Love" | Phil Collins | 2 | |
| 80. | "Rocket" | Def Leppard | 15 | |
| 81. | "You'll Never Know" | 1927 | 15 | |
| 82. | "Bring Me Some Water" | Melissa Etheridge | 9 | |
| 83. | "Can I Get a Witness" | Sam Brown | 17 | |
| 84. | "Love Bites" | Def Leppard | 21 | |
| 85. | "Miss You Much" | Janet Jackson | 12 | |
| 86. | "Where Did I Go Wrong" | UB40 | 17 | |
| 87. | "Every Rose Has Its Thorn" | Poison | 16 | |
| 88. | "Every Little Step" | Bobby Brown | 8 | |
| 89. | "Love Dimension" | Kate Ceberano | 14 | |
| 90. | "Touch the Fire" | Icehouse | 13 | |
| 91. | "Sowing the Seeds of Love" | Tears for Fears | 13 | |
| 92. | "Buffalo Stance" | Neneh Cherry | 21 | |
| 93. | "Pop Singer" | John Cougar Mellencamp | 8 | |
| 94. | "House of Cards" | James Reyne | 17 | |
| 95. | "Electric Youth" | Debbie Gibson | 21 | |
| 96. | "Second Chance" | .38 Special | 14 | |
| 97. | "I Won't Back Down" | Tom Petty | 16 | |
| 98. | "Love Shack | The B-52's | 1 | 6 |
| 99. | "Wouldn't Change a Thing" | Kylie Minogue | 6 | |
| 100. | "Sealed with a Kiss" | Jason Donovan | 8 | |

Peak chart positions are from the ARIA Charts, overall position on the End of Year Chart is calculated by ARIA based on the number of weeks and position that the records reach within the Top 50 singles for each week during 1989.
