= List of top 25 singles for 1985 in Australia =

Top 25 singles of 1985 < 1984 1986 >

Other Australian top charts for 1985
- top 25 albums

Australian top 40 charts for the 1980s
- singles
- albums

Australian number-one charts of 1985
- albums
- singles

The following lists the top 25 (end of year) charting singles on the Australian Singles Charts, for the year of 1985. These were the best charting singles in Australia for 1985. The source for this year is the Kent Music Report.

#	Title	Artist	Highest pos. reached	Weeks at No. 1
1.	"We Are the World"	USA for Africa	1	9
2.	"Angel" / "Into the Groove"	Madonna	1	4
3.	"Crazy for You"	Madonna	1	4
4.	"Live it Up"	Mental As Anything	2	
5.	"I Want to Know What Love Is"	Foreigner	1	5
6.	"Out of Mind, Out of Sight"	Models	1	2
7.	"Money for Nothing"	Dire Straits	4	
8.	"I Got You Babe"	UB40 with Chrissie Hynde	1	3
9.	"I Should Have Known Better (Jim Diamond song)"	Jim Diamond	1	1
10.	"Would I Lie To You?"	Eurythmics	1	2
11.	"Dancing in the Street"	David Bowie & Mick Jagger	1	2
12.	"Take On Me"	a-ha	1	2
13.	"You Spin Me Round (Like a Record)"	Dead or Alive	3	
14.	"Shout"	Tears For Fears	1	1
15.	"One Night in Bangkok"	Murray Head	1	1
16.	"Born in the U.S.A."	Bruce Springsteen	2	
17.	"Neutron Dance"	Pointer Sisters	4	
18.	"What You Need"	INXS	2	
19.	"Do They Know It's Christmas?"	Band Aid	1	4
20.	"We Don't Need Another Hero"	Tina Turner	1	3
21.	"Walking on Sunshine"	Katrina and the Waves	4	
22.	"The Heat Is On"	Glenn Frey	2	
23.	"The Power of Love"	Jennifer Rush	1	2
24.	"The Power of Love"	Huey Lewis and the News	1	2
25.	"Like a Virgin"	Madonna	1	5 (#1 in 1984 & 85)

These charts are calculated by David Kent of the Kent Music Report.
