= List of top 25 singles for 1983 in Australia =

Top 25 singles of 1983 < 1982 1984 >

Other Australian top charts for 1983
- top 25 albums

Australian top 40 charts for the 1980s
- singles
- albums

Australian number-one charts of 1983
- albums
- singles

The following lists the top 25 (end of year) charting singles on the Australian Singles Charts, for the year of 1983. These were the best charting singles in Australia for 1983. The source for this year is the Kent Music Report.

#	Title	Artist	Highest pos. reached	Weeks at No. 1
1.	"Australiana"	Austen Tayshus	1	8
2.	"Flashdance... What a Feeling"	Irene Cara	1	7
3.	"Gloria"	Laura Branigan	1	7
4.	"Billie Jean"	Michael Jackson	1	5
5.	"Up Where We Belong"	Joe Cocker & Jennifer Warnes	1	2
6.	"Total Eclipse of the Heart"	Bonnie Tyler	1	6
7.	"Save Your Love"	Renee and Renato	3	
8.	"Karma Chameleon"	Culture Club	1	5
9.	"Beat It"	Michael Jackson	2	
10.	"Every Breath You Take"	The Police	2	
11.	"Bop Girl"	Pat Wilson	2	
12.	"Reckless"	Australian Crawl	1	1
13.	"I Was Only 19"	Redgum	1	2
14.	"Twisting by the Pool"	Dire Straits	2	
15.	"Rain"	Dragon	2	
16.	"1999"	Prince	2	
17.	"Give it Up"	KC and the Sunshine Band	3	
18.	"Heartbreaker"	Dionne Warwick	2	
19.	"I'm Still Standing"	Elton John	3	
20.	"Electric Avenue"	Eddy Grant	2	
21.	"You Can't Hurry Love"	Phil Collins	2	
22.	"Do You Really Want to Hurt Me"	Culture Club	1	6 (pkd #1 82 & 83)
23.	"Safety Dance"	Men Without Hats	5	
24.	"Let's Dance"	David Bowie	2	
25.	"Africa"	Toto	5	

These charts are calculated by David Kent of the Kent Music Report.
