= List of top 25 albums for 1986 in Australia =

Top 25 albums of 1986 < 1985 1987 >

Other Australian top charts for 1986
- top 25 singles

Australian top 40 charts for the 1980s
- singles
- albums

Australian number-one charts of 1986
- albums
- singles

The following lists the top 25 (end of year) charting albums on the Australian Album Charts, for the year of 1986. These were the best charting albums in Australia for 1986. The source for this year is the "Kent Music Report", known from 1987 onwards as the "Australian Music Report".

#	Title	Artist	Highest pos. reached	Weeks at No. 1
1.	Whitney Houston	Whitney Houston	1	11
2.	Brothers in Arms	Dire Straits	1	34 (pkd #1 in 1985 & 86)
3.	For the Working Class Man	Jimmy Barnes	1	7
4.	Scarecrow	John Cougar Mellencamp	2	
5.	Revenge	Eurythmics	2	
6.	Rock a Little	Stevie Nicks	5	
7.	The Dream of the Blue Turtles	Sting	1	3
8.	Invisible Touch	Genesis	3	
9.	Kev's Back	Kevin Bloody Wilson	8	
10.	True Blue	Madonna	1	2
11.	The Bridge	Billy Joel	2	
12.	Cocker	Joe Cocker	9	
13.	The Cars Greatest Hits	The Cars	3	
14.	Listen Like Thieves	INXS	1	2 (pkd #1 in 1985)
15.	Fine Young Cannibals	Fine Young Cannibals	2	
16.	Picture Book	Simply Red	6	
17.	Little Creatures	Talking Heads	2	
18.	Promise	Sade	9	
19.	Top Gun	Original Motion Picture Soundtrack	3	
20.	Feargal Sharkey	Feargal Sharkey	7	
21.	5150	Van Halen	5	
22.	Graceland	Paul Simon	1	5 (pkd #1 in 1986 & 87)
23.	Dirty Work	Rolling Stones	2	
24.	Dancing on the Ceiling	Lionel Richie	2	
25.	True Colours	Cyndi Lauper	1	4

These charts are calculated by David Kent of the Kent Music Report and they are based on the number of weeks and position the records reach within the top 100 albums for each week.

source: David Kent's "Australian Chart Book 1970-1992"
