= List of top 25 singles for 1984 in Australia =

Top 25 singles of 1984 < 1983 1985 >

Other Australian top charts for 1984
- top 25 albums

Australian top 40 charts for the 1980s
- singles
- albums

Australian number-one charts of 1984
- albums
- singles

The following lists the top 25 (end of year) charting singles on the Australian Singles Charts, for the year of 1984. These were the best charting singles in Australia for 1984. The source for this year is the Kent Music Report.

#	Title	Artist	Highest pos. reached	Weeks at No. 1
1.	"Dancing in the Dark"	Bruce Springsteen	5	
2.	"It's Just Not Cricket"	The Twelfth Man	1	3
3.	"Ghostbusters"	Ray Parker Jr	2	
4.	"Careless Whisper"	George Michael	1	4
5.	"Wake Me Up Before You Go-Go"	Wham!	1	7
6.	"I Just Called to Say I Love You"	Stevie Wonder	1	8
7.	"Footloose"	Kenny Loggins	1	3
8.	"Hello"	Lionel Richie	1	3
9.	"Girls Just Want to Have Fun"	Cyndi Lauper	1	2
10.	"Islands in the Stream"	Kenny Rogers & Dolly Parton	1	1 (pkd #1 in 1983)
11.	"Love Is a Battlefield"	Pat Benatar	1	5
12.	"Original Sin"	INXS	1	2
13.	"Come Said the Boy"	Mondo Rock	2	
14.	"When Doves Cry"	Prince	1	4
15.	"Heaven (Must Be There)"	Eurogliders	2	
16.	"Relax"	Frankie Goes to Hollywood	5	
17.	"Thriller"	Michael Jackson	4	
18.	"99 Luftballons"	Nena	1	5
19.	"Calling Your Name"	Marilyn	3	
20.	"Two Tribes"	Frankie Goes to Hollywood	4	
21.	"Against All Odds"	Phil Collins	3	
22.	"What's Love Got to Do with It"	Tina Turner	1	1
23.	"All Night Long (All Night)"	Lionel Richie	1	6 (pkd #1 in 1983 & 84)
24.	"I Can Dream About You"	Dan Hartman	3	
25.	"Burn for You"	INXS	3	

These charts are calculated by David Kent of the Kent Music Report.
