= List of top 25 singles for 1988 in Australia =

Top 25 singles of 1988 < 1987 1989 >

Other Australian top charts for 1988
- top 25 albums

Australian top 40 charts for the 1980s
- singles
- albums

Australian number-one charts of 1988
- albums
- singles

The following lists the top 50 singles of 1988 in Australia from the Australian Recording Industry Association (ARIA) End of Year Singles Chart. These were the first End of Year singles charts created by ARIA, it had started producing its own charts from mid-1988. ARIA had previously used the Kent Music Report, known from 1987 onwards as the Australian Music Report.

#	Title	Artist	Highest pos. reached	Weeks at No. 1
1.	"(I've Had) The Time of My Life"	Bill Medley and Jennifer Warnes	1	6 (Note: "(I've Had) The Time of My Life", "Simply Irresistible", "Get Outta My Dreams, Get into My Car", "I Should Be So Lucky", "Never Gonna Give You Up" and "Faith" peaked at #1 on the Kent Music Report in early 1988. "Never Gonna Give You Up" also peaked at #1 on the Kent Music Report during 1987.)
2.	"Simply Irresistible"	Robert Palmer	1	5 (Note: "Simply Irresistible", "The Flame", "What a Wonderful World", "Perfect", "Age of Reason", "Don't Worry, Be Happy" and "Got to Be Certain" peaked at #1 on the ARIA Charts in late 1988.)
3.	"The Flame"	Cheap Trick	1	3
4.	"Get Outta My Dreams, Get into My Car"	Billy Ocean	1	5
5.	"I Should Be So Lucky"	Kylie Minogue	1	6
6.	"Perfect"	Fairground Attraction	1	4
7.	"What a Wonderful World"	Louis Armstrong	1	2
8.	"Never Gonna Give You Up"	Rick Astley	1	7 (pkd #1 in 1987 & 1988)
9.	"Age of Reason"	John Farnham	1	4
10.	"Better Be Home Soon"	Crowded House	2	
11.	"Heaven Is a Place on Earth"	Belinda Carlisle	2	
12.	"Whenever You Need Somebody"	Rick Astley	3	
13.	"Don't Be Cruel"	Cheap Trick	5	
14.	"Don't Worry, Be Happy"	Bobby McFerrin	1	1
15.	"Doctorin' the Tardis"	The Timelords	2	
16.	"All Fired Up"	Pat Benatar	2	
17.	"Got My Mind Set on You"	George Harrison	6	
18.	"Got to Be Certain"	Kylie Minogue	1	3
19.	"Faith"	George Michael	1	1
20.	"A Groovy Kind of Love"	Phil Collins	5	
21.	"Stutter Rap"	Morris Minor and the Majors	2	
22.	"Wanna Be Up"	Chantoozies	3	
23.	"Underneath the Radar"	Underworld	3	
24.	"Love in the First Degree"	Bananarama	5	
25.	"Run to Paradise"	The Choirboys	3	
26.	"When Will I Be Famous?"	Bros	5	
27.	"Sign Your Name"	Terence Trent D'Arby	3	
28.	"Desire"	U2	1	3
29.	"Push It"	Salt-N-Pepa	3	
30.	"(Sittin' On) The Dock of the Bay"	Michael Bolton	3	
31.	"The Only Way Is Up"	Yazz & the Plastic Population	2	
32.	"I Think We're Alone Now"	Tiffany	13	
33.	"I Found Someone	Cher	8	
34.	"I Want You Back"	Bananarama	3	
35.	"Always on My Mind"	Pet Shop Boys	10	
36.	"Nothing's Gonna Change My Love for You"	Glenn Medeiros	10	
37.	"Breakaway"	Big Pig	8	
38.	"Could've Been"	Tiffany	8	
39.	"Hungry Eyes"	Eric Carmen	4	
40.	"That's When I Think of You"	1927	6	
41.	"Boys (Summertime Love)"	Sabrina	11	
42.	"Pink Cadillac"	Natalie Cole	6	
43.	"Tell It to My Heart"	Taylor Dayne	10	
44.	"Fast Car"	Tracy Chapman	4	
45.	"Pump Up the Volume"	MARRS	6	
46.	"Make Me Lose Control"	Eric Carmen	8	
47.	"Hazy Shade of Winter"	The Bangles	7	
48.	"Motor's Too Fast"	James Reyne	6	
49.	"Nothin' but a Good Time"	Poison	10	
50.	"Blue Monday 1988"	New Order	4	

Peak chart positions from 1987 and early 1988 were calculated by David Kent for the Kent Music Report. Late 1988 peak chart positions are from the ARIA Charts. Overall position on the End of Year Chart is calculated by ARIA based on the number of weeks and position that the records reach within the Top 50 singles for each week during 1988.
