= Hold On to Me =

Hold On to Me may refer to:

- "Hold On to Me" (Sofia Carson song), released as a single 2020 and on her self-titled album (Sofia Carson) in 2022
- "Hold On to Me" (Lauren Daigle song), 2021
- "Hold On to Me" (Courtney Love song), 2004
- "Hold On to Me" (John Michael Montgomery song), 1998
- "Hold On to Me", a song by the Cowboy Junkies from their 1996 album Lay It Down
- "Hold On to Me", a song by Elevation Worship from their 2016 album, Here as in Heaven
- "Hold On to Me", a song by Rissi Palmer from Rissi Palmer
- Hold On to Me (album), a 1988 album by the Black Sorrows
  - "Hold On to Me" (The Black Sorrows song), the title track from the album
