= List of top 25 singles for 1987 in Australia =

Top 25 singles of 1987 < 1986 1988 >

Other Australian top charts for 1987
- top 25 albums

Australian top 40 charts for the 1980s
- singles
- albums

Australian number-one charts of 1987
- albums
- singles

The following lists the top 25 (end of year) charting singles on the Australian Singles Charts, for the year of 1987. These were the best charting singles in Australia for 1987. The source for this year is the Kent Music Report, known in 1987 as the "Australian Music Report".

| # | Title | Artist | Highest pos. reached | Weeks at No. 1 |
|---|---|---|---|---|
| 1. | "Locomotion" | Kylie Minogue | 1 | 7 |
| 2. | "La Bamba" | Los Lobos | 1 | 7 |
| 3. | "Old Time Rock and Roll" | Bob Seger | 3 | |
| 4. | "Slice of Heaven" | Dave Dobbyn with Herbs | 1 | 4 |
| 5. | "Respectable" | Mel and Kim | 1 | 1 |
| 6. | "You Keep Me Hangin' On" | Kim Wilde | 1 | 2 |
| 7. | "Walk Like an Egyptian" | The Bangles | 1 | 2 |
| 8. | "Electric Blue" | Icehouse | 1 | 1 |
| 9. | "Boom Boom (Let's Go Back to My Room)" | Paul Lekakis | 1 | 5 |
| 10. | "The Final Countdown" | Europe | 2 | |
| 11. | "I Wanna Dance With Somebody (Who Loves Me)" | Whitney Houston | 1 | 5 |
| 12. | "Nothing's Gonna Stop Us Now" | Starship | 3 | |
| 13. | "Suddenly" | Angry Anderson | 2 | |
| 14. | "He's Gonna Step on You Again" | The Party Boys | 1 | 2 |
| 15. | "I Wanna Wake Up With You" | Boris Gardiner | 1 | 1 |
| 16. | "Pressure Down" | John Farnham | 4 | |
| 17. | "Livin' on a Prayer" | Bon Jovi | 3 | |
| 18. | "Crazy" | Icehouse | 4 | |
| 19. | "Funkytown" | Pseudo Echo | 1 | 7 (pkd #1 in 1986 & 87) |
| 20. | "I Knew You Were Waiting (For Me)" | Aretha Franklin & George Michael | 1 | 4 |
| 21. | "Beds Are Burning" | Midnight Oil | 6 | |
| 22. | "Bad" | Michael Jackson | 4 | |
| 23. | "Good Times" | INXS With Jimmy Barnes | 2 | |
| 24. | "Star Trekkin'" | The Firm | 3 | |
| 25. | "What's My Scene" | Hoodoo Gurus | 3 | |

These charts are calculated by David Kent of the Kent Music Report.
