= List of top 25 albums for 1987 in Australia =

Top 25 albums of 1987 < 1986 1988 >

Other Australian top charts for 1987
- top 25 singles

Australian top 40 charts for the 1980s
- singles
- albums

Australian number-one charts of 1987
- albums
- singles

The following lists the top 25 (end of year) charting albums on the Australian Album Charts, for the year of 1987. These were the best charting albums in Australia for 1987. The source for this year is the "Kent Music Report", known from 1987 onwards as the "Australian Music Report".

#	Title	Artist	Highest pos. reached	Weeks at No. 1
1.	Whispering Jack	John Farnham	1	25 (pkd #1 in 1986 & 87)
2.	Crowded House	Crowded House	1	1
3.	Slippery When Wet	Bon Jovi	1	6
4.	Graceland	Paul Simon	1	5 (pkd #1 in 1986 & 87)
5.	The Joshua Tree	U2	3	
6.	Tango in the Night	Fleetwood Mac	5	
7.	Revenge	Eurythmics	2	
8.	Men and Women	Simply Red	5	
9.	Whitney	Whitney Houston	1	3
10.	Different Light	The Bangles	2	
11.	Diesel and Dust	Midnight Oil	1	6
12.	Whiplash Smile	Billy Idol	6	
13.	Strong Persuader	Robert Cray Band	6	
14.	La Bamba	Motion Picture Soundtrack	2	
15.	F.L.M.	Mel and Kim	2	
16.	Bad	Michael Jackson	2	
17.	Get Close	The Pretenders	12	
18.	Man of Colours	Icehouse	1	11
19.	Howling	The Angels	6	
20.	Blow Your Cool	Hoodoo Gurus	2	
21.	True Blue	Madonna	1	2 (pkd #1 in 1986)
22.	Solitude Standing	Suzanne Vega	7	
23.	The Big Chill	Motion Picture Soundtrack	5	
24.	Mallee Boy	John Williamson	9	
25.	James Reyne	James Reyne	4	

These charts are calculated by David Kent of the Kent Music Report and they are based on the number of weeks and position the records reach within the top 100 albums for each week.

source: David Kent's "Australian Chart Book 1970-1992"
