= Keep On Dancing =

Keep On Dancing or Keep On Dancin' may refer to:

== Literature ==
- Keep On Dancing, an autobiography by Sarah Churchill

== Film ==
- Keep On Dancing (film), a 1988 Hong Kong film starring Michael Chow

== Music ==
- Keep On Dancing (album), a 1983 Australian compilation album
- Keep On Dancin', a 1974 album by Hamilton Bohannon
- "Keep On Dancing" (The Gentrys song), 1965
- "Keep On Dancin'" (Gary's Gang song), 1979
- "Keep On Dancing" (DJ BoBo song), 1993
- "Keep On Dancing", a song by The Jacksons from The Jacksons
- "Keep On (Dancin')", a song by Diana Ross on the 1989 album Workin' Overtime
- "Keep On Dancin", a song by Ellie Goulding from her 2015 album Delirium
- "Keep On Dancin' (Let's Go)", a song by Perpetual Motion on the Positiva Records label, 1998
- "Hella Good", a song by Gwen Stefani which includes the repeated lyrics "keep on dancin'", which is sometimes mistaken for the song's title
