= 1984 Shakin' =

Compilation album by various artists
- Released: February 1984
- Genre: Pop
- Label: Festival Records

1984 Shakin' was a various artists "hits" collection album released in Australia in 1984 on the Festival record Label (Cat No. RML 50005). The album spent two weeks at the top of the Australian album charts in 1984.

== Track listing ==
Side One
No.	Title	Performing Artist	Length
1.	"Listening"	Pseudo Echo	3:01
2.	"Say It Isn't So"	Daryl Hall & John Oates	3:58
3.	"Right By Your Side"	Eurythmics	3:50
4.	"Heart and Soul"	Huey Lewis and the News	3:55
5.	"Twist of Fate"	Olivia Newton-John	3:39
6.	"Computer One"	Dear Enemy	4:17
7.	"Change in Mood"	Kids In The Kitchen	3:42
8.	"Catch Me I'm Falling"	Real Life	3:33
9.	"Let's Stay Together"	Tina Turner	3:33

Side Two
No.	Title	Performing Artist	Length
1.	"Love Is a Battlefield"	Pat Benatar	4:09
2.	"Baby, You're Dynamite"	Cliff Richard	3:56
3.	"Everywhere I Go"	QED	3:35
4.	"Bon Voyage"	Little Heroes	3:37
5.	"Staring at the Embers"	Tim Finn	3:02
6.	"My Girl"	Hoodoo Gurus	2:41
7.	"Chinese I's (Here Come The Minute Men)"	Venetians	3:48
8.	"Union of the Snake"	Duran Duran	4:20
9.	"Dancing with Myself"	Billy Idol	3:19

== Charts ==
Chart (1984)	Peak position
Australia (Kent Music Report)	1
