= Bitter Tears (disambiguation) =

Bitter Tears is a 1964 album by Johnny Cash.

Bitter Tears may also refer to:

- "Bitter Tears" (song), a 1991 INXS song
- "Bitter Tears", a 1952 song by Leon McAuliffe
- "Bitter Tears", a 1988 song by The Venetians
- "Bitter Tears", a 1996 song by The Magnetic Fields on 69 Love Songs

== See also ==
- The Bitter Tears of Petra von Kant (German: Die bitteren Tränen der Petra von Kant), a 1972 German film
