= Way to Go =

Way to Go may refer to:

== Music ==
=== Albums ===
- 1986 Way to Go, an Australian hit-song compilation album

=== Songs ===
- "Way to Go!", a 2005 song by Rogue Traders
- "Way to Go!", a 2009 song by Girls' Generation from Gee
- "Way to Go", a 2017 song by Joyner Lucas featuring Snoh Aalegra from 508-507-2209
- "Way to Go", a 2017 song by Empire of the Sun from Two Vines
- "Way to Go", a 1999 song by Flotsam and Jetsam from Unnatural Selection

== Film and television ==
- Way to Go (TV series), a British television sitcom
- "Way to Go" (CSI), an episode of CSI: Crime Scene Investigation

== Other uses ==
- Way to Go (interactive), a 2015 interactive VR work
