= Go for It =

Go for It may refer to:

== Music ==
- Go for It (Stiff Little Fingers album), 1981
- Go for It (compilation album), a 1983 Australian compilation album by various artists, which peaked at number 1 on the Australian charts
- Go for It... Live!, a 2003 album by Fu Manchu
- Go for It (Shalamar album), 1981
- "The Second Time", a 1984 single by Kim Wilde, re-titled "Go for It" for the North American market
- "Go for It" (song), a 1987 single by English football team Coventry City
- "Go for it [Heart and Fire]", a 1990 single by Joey B. Ellis from the soundtrack to Rocky V

== Other media ==
- Go4It, a UK children's magazine radio programme
- Go for It! Roadshow, a children's health educational roadshow produced by HealthSouth Corporation
- Go for It (1983 film) (Nati con la camicia), a 1983 film starring Terence Hill and Bud Spencer
- Go for It! (2011 film), a 2011 film starring Aimee Garcia
- Vivir intentando (English: Go for It), a 2003 Argentine film starring the members of the girl group Bandana
  - Vivir Intentando, an album by Bandana
- Go for It, Baby (German: Zur Sache, Schätzchen), a 1968 West German comedy film
- Chak De! India (lit. 'Go for It! India'), a 2007 Indian sports drama film
- Go for it!, a Parker Brothers board game
- Go for It (game show), a British TV game show

== See also ==
- "Young Guns (Go for It)", a 1982 single by Wham!, and the B-side, "Going for It"
- Just Do It, a trademark of shoe company Nike
- Impulsivity
