= The Best of Joe Cocker =

The Best of Joe Cocker is the name of two albums by Joe Cocker, including:

- The Best of Joe Cocker (1983 album)
- The Best of Joe Cocker (1992 album)
