= 1986 Just for Kicks =

Compilation album by Various artists
- Released: August 1986
- Genre: Pop
- Label: Festival/EMI

1986 Just For Kicks was a various artists "hits" collection album released in Australia in 1986 on the Festival/EMI record Label (Cat No. HPP-261108). The album spent 4 weeks at the top of the Australian album charts in 1986.

== Track listing ==
Side One
No.	Title	Performing Artist	Length
1.	"Princes of the Universe"	Queen
2.	"Who Made Who"	AC/DC
3.	"Hyperactive"	Robert Palmer
4.	"Mean to Me"	Crowded House
5.	"Left Of Center"	Suzanne Vega
6.	"Before Too Long"	Paul Kelly
7.	"God Thank You Woman"	Culture Club
8.	"If Somebody Loves You"	Venetians
9.	"Manic Monday"	The Bangles

Side Two
No.	Title	Performing Artist	Length
1.	"Touch Me (I Want Your Body)"	Samantha Fox
2.	"Let's Go All the Way"	Sly Fox
3.	"Do You Wanna Be?"	I'm Talking
4.	"Shell Shock"	New Order
5.	"Sledgehammer"	Peter Gabriel
6.	"What Have You Done for Me Lately"	Janet Jackson
7.	"I Wanna Be a Cowboy"	Boys Don't Cry
8.	"If You Leave"	OMD
9.	"There'll Be Sad Songs (To Make You Cry)"	Billy Ocean

== Charts ==
Chart (1986)	Peak position
Australia (Kent Music Report)	1
