= Summer '87 =

Compilation album by various artists
- Released: November 1986
- Genre: Pop
- Label: Polystar

Summer '87 was a various artists "current hits" collection album released in Australia in 1986 on the Polystar record label (Cat No. 830 674 1). The album spent two weeks at the top of the Australian album charts in 1987. It was available on vinyl, cassette and the new format (at the time) Compact Disc. Two bonus tracks featured on the cassette & CD versions: You're Gonna Get Hurt (Jenny Morris) & Stay (Oingo Boingo). It was the very first of these types of compilations that was available on CD in Australia.

== Track listing ==
=== Side one ===
1. Lionel Richie – "Dancing on the Ceiling"
2. The Communards – "Don't Leave Me This Way"
3. Elton John – "Heartache All Over the World"
4. Eurythmics – "Missionary Man"
5. Hollywood Beyond – "What's the Colour of Money"
6. Oingo Boingo – "Stay" [Not on LP]
7. Wa Wa Nee – "I Could Make You Love Me"
8. Stacey Q – "Two of Hearts"
9. Cyndi Lauper – "True Colors"

=== Side two ===
1. Run–D.M.C. featuring Aerosmith – "Walk This Way"
2. Kenny Loggins – "Danger Zone"
3. Dragon – "Dreams of Ordinary Men"
4. Bon Jovi – "You Give Love a Bad Name"
5. Jenny Morris – "You're Gonna Get Hurt" [Not on LP]
6. Belinda Carlisle – "Mad About You"
7. Billy Joel – "A Matter of Trust"
8. Berlin – "Take My Breath Away"
9. John Farnham – "You're the Voice"

== Charts ==
Chart (1986/87)	Peak position
Australia (Kent Music Report)	1
