= The Chosen Ones (song) =

Single by The Black Sorrows

from the album Hold On to Me
- Released: October 1988
- Genre: Blues rock
- Length: 4:06
- Label: CBS
- Songwriter(s): Joe Camilleri, Nick Smith
- Producer(s): Jeff Burstin, Joe Camilleri

The Black Sorrows singles chronology
"Hold On to Me" (1988)	"The Chosen Ones" (1988)	"Chained to the Wheel" (1989)

"The Chosen Ones" is a song by Australian blues and rock band The Black Sorrows. It was released as the second single from their fifth studio album Hold On to Me. The song peaked at number 65 in Australia and number 32 in New Zealand in October 1988.

== Track listing ==
7" single (CBS 653044 7)

1. "The Chosen Ones" – 4:06
2. "Mercenary Heart" – 3:08

== Charts ==
Chart (1988)	Peak position
Australia (ARIA)	65
New Zealand (Recorded Music NZ)	32
