= Hitwave '81 =

Compilation album by various artists
- Released: August 1981
- Genre: Pop
- Label: Polystar

Hitwave '81 was a various artists "hits" collection album released in Australia in 1981 on the Polystar record Label (Catalogue No. 6878-088). The album spent 1 week at the top of the Australian album charts in 1981. It was the first 'various artists hits' compilation album to make the number one spot on the Kent Music Report charts in its history. In early May 1982, a follow up compilation "Hitwave '82" was released, similar in name only. Also selling well, reaching No.2 on the Australian charts partly due to the unique fact that the LP included "18 Free Stickers" of each artist/band featured.

== Track listing ==
=== Side 1 ===
1. "Stars on 45" - Stars On 45
2. "This Ole House" - Shakin' Stevens
3. "Keep on Loving You" - REO Speedwagon
4. "Gotta Pull Myself Together" - The Nolans
5. "Who Can It Be Now?" - Men at Work
6. "Shout and Deliver" - The Reels
7. "How Come" - The Sports
8. "Fade to Grey" - Visage
9. "Jealous Guy" - Roxy Music

=== Side 2 ===
1. "Turn Me Loose" - Loverboy
2. "Antmusic" - Adam and the Ants
3. "Celebration" - Kool and the Gang
4. "Hip, Shake, Jerk!" - The Quick
5. "Into the Heat" - The Angels
6. "History Never Repeats" - Split Enz
7. "Falling In & Out" - Mi-Sex
8. "Nobody Wins" - Elton John
9. "The Wild Colonial Boy" - Dr. Hook

== Charts ==
Chart (1981)	Peak position
Australia (Kent Music Report)	1
