= Summer '89 =

Compilation album by various artists
- Released: 1988
- Genre: Pop
- Label: Polystar

Summer '89 was a various artists "hits" collection album released in Australia in 1988. The album spent 2 weeks at the top of the Australian album charts in December 1988 / January 1989.

== Track listing ==
1. "Two Strong Hearts" - John Farnham
2. "The Only Way Is Up" - Yazz and the Plastic Population
3. "Never Tear Us Apart" - INXS
4. "Bad Medicine" - Bon Jovi
5. "Sexy Girl" - Sabrina
6. "Wild, Wild West" - The Escape Club
7. "Hold On To Me" - The Black Sorrows
8. "So Excellent" - Kylie Mole
9. "A Groovy Kind of Love" - Phil Collins
10. "You Came" - Kim Wilde
11. "Sweet Child o' Mine" - Guns N' Roses
12. "As the Days Go By" - Daryl Braithwaite
13. "Fallen Angel" - Poison
14. "I Quit" - Bros
15. "Touch" - Noiseworks
16. "I Want Your Love" - Transvision Vamp
17. "If I Could" - 1927
18. "Oh Yeah" - Yello

== Charts ==
Chart (1988–1989)	Peak position
Australia (ARIA Charts)	1
