= Hits of '89 Volume 1 =

Compilation album by various artists
- Released: March 1989
- Genre: Pop
- Label: EMI

Hits of '89 Vol. 1 was a "hits" collection album featuring various artists released in Australia in 1989. The album spent 5 weeks at the top of the Australian album charts in 1989.

== Track listing ==
1. "I'm Gonna Be (500 Miles)" - The Proclaimers
2. "Like the Way I Do" - Melissa Etheridge
3. "Especially for You" - Kylie Minogue & Jason Donovan
4. "Dont Walk Away" - Toni Childs
5. "Soul Revival" - Johnny Diesel and the Injectors
6. "Angel of Harlem" - U2
7. "Buffalo Stance" - Neneh Cherry
8. "Where Did I Go Wrong" - UB40
9. "Last Frontier" - Jimmy Barnes
10. "You Got It" - Roy Orbison
11. "Tucker's Daughter" - Ian Moss
12. "Dumb Things" - Paul Kelly & The Coloured Girls
13. "She Makes My Day" - Robert Palmer
14. "The Music Goes Round My Head" - The Saints
15. "Teardrops" - Womack & Womack
16. "Lets Stick Together" - Bryan Ferry
17. "Permanently Single" - The Cockroaches

== Charts ==
| Chart (1989) | Peak position |
|---|---|
| Australia (ARIA Charts) | 1 |
