= 1982 Out of the Blue =

Compilation album by Various artists
- Released: August 1982
- Genre: Pop
- Label: Festival Records

1982 Out of the Blue is a various artists "hits" compilation album released in Australia in 1982 on the Festival record label (Catalogue No. RML 50003). The album spent five weeks at the top of the Australian album charts in 1982.

== Track listing ==
Side One
No.	Title	Performing Artist	Length
1.	"I Love Rock 'n Roll"	Joan Jett & The Blackhearts	2:55
2.	"Don't Talk to Strangers"	Rick Springfield	3:00
3.	"Six Months in a Leaky Boat"	Split Enz	3:53
4.	"The Other Woman"	Ray Parker Jr.	3:42
5.	"Only You"	Yazoo	3:10
6.	"View from a Bridge"	Kim Wilde	3:24
7.	"Radio"	The Members	3:54
8.	"Do You Believe in Love"	Huey Lewis and the News	3:30
9.	"Shut Down"	Australian Crawl	4:06

Side Two
No.	Title	Performing Artist	Length
1.	"I Ran (So Far Away)"	A Flock of Seagulls	3:58
2.	"Hungry Like the Wolf"	Duran Duran	3:29
3.	"It Must Be Love"	Madness	3:22
4.	"Island of Lost Souls"	Blondie	3:47
5.	"Freeze Frame"	The J. Geils Band	3:56
6.	"Love Plus One"	Haircut One Hundred	3:32
7.	"Shout! Shout! (Knock Yourself Out)"	Rocky Sharpe and the Replays	2:47
8.	"One Perfect Day"	Little Heroes	3:30
9.	"Classic"	Adrian Gurvitz	3:40

=== Charts ===
Chart (1982)	Peak position
Australia (Kent Music Report)	1
