= 1986 Way to Go =

Compilation album by various artists
- Released: 1986
- Genre: Pop
- Label: Festival/EMI

1986 Way To Go is a various artists "hits" collection album released in Australia in 1986 on the Festival/EMI record Label (Cat No. RML-50008). The album spent 3 weeks at the top of the Australian album charts in 1986.

== Track listing ==
Side One
No.	Title	Performing Artist	Length
1.	"When the Going Gets Tough, the Tough Get Going"	Billy Ocean	4:02
2.	"Love an Adventure"	Pseudo Echo	4:14
3.	"West End Girls"	Pet Shop Boys	3:55
4.	"So Much for Love"	The Venetians	3:35
5.	"Sex And Fame"	Jump Incorporated	3:15
6.	"Absolute Beginners"	David Bowie	5:35
7.	"Say I'm Your Number One"	Princess	3:38
8.	"I Do What I Do (Theme for 9½ Weeks)"	John Taylor	3:45
9.	"Tarzan Boy"	Baltimora	3:18

Side Two
No.	Title	Performing Artist	Length
1.	"Chain Reaction"	Diana Ross	3:50
2.	"Don't Look Down"	Go West	4:17
3.	"Sanctify Yourself"	Simple Minds	3:48
4.	"Baby, You're So Strange"	Icehouse	3:58
5.	"Addicted to Love"	Robert Palmer	4:04
6.	"Death Defying"	Hoodoo Gurus	3:21
7.	"Talk to Me"	Stevie Nicks	4:08
8.	"Say Goodbye"	Hunters & Collectors	3:49
9.	"Ride the Night Away"	Jimmy Barnes	3:34

== Charts ==
Chart (1986)	Peak position
Australia (Kent Music Report)	1
