= Choose 1985 =

Compilation album by Various Artists
- Released: November 1984
- Genre: Pop, rock
- Label: Polygram Records

Choose 1985 was a various artists "hits" collection album released in Australia in late 1984, a joint venture between record companies Festival, RCA, and EMI (Cat No. RML 50006). The album spent nine weeks at the top of the Australian albums chart from December 1984 to February 1985. This is the best selling compilation album of the 1980s. The compilation album was available on LP and Cassette with two different covers (white or pink), as well as a selection of the songs' videos on VHS and Beta video cassette. Notably, due to movie copyright restrictions, "Ghostbusters" was omitted from the video cassette release.

== Track listing ==
1. "Ghostbusters" – Ray Parker Jr.
2. "Sunglasses at Night" – Corey Hart
3. "Pride (In the Name of Love)" – U2
4. "Missing You" – John Waite
5. "No Say In It" – Machinations
6. "You Think You're a Man" – Divine
7. "Dynamite" – Jermaine Jackson
8. "Searchin' (I Gotta Find a Man)" – Hazell Dean
9. "What's Love Got to Do with It" – Tina Turner
10. "Out of Touch" – Hall & Oates
11. "Soul Kind of Feeling" – Dynamic Hepnotics
12. "Jump (For My Love)" – Pointer Sisters
13. "Flesh for Fantasy" – Billy Idol
14. "No Second Prize" – Jimmy Barnes
15. "Shake This City" – Non Stop Dancers
16. "I Walk Away" – Split Enz
17. "Everybody Wants to Work" – Uncanny X-Men
18. "Agadoo" – Black Lace

== Charts ==
Chart (1984/5)	Peak position
Australia (Kent Music Report)	1

Preceded by Red Sails in the Sunset by Midnight Oil	Australian Kent Music Report number-one album 3 December 1984 – 3 February 1985	Succeeded by Make It Big by Wham!
