= 1983 ... Summer Breaks =

Compilation album by Various artists
- Released: November 1983
- Genre: Pop
- Label: EMI

1983 ... Summer Breaks was a various artists "hits" collection album released in Australia in 1983 on EMI (Catalogue No. GIVE 2009). The album spent 3 weeks at the top of the Australian album charts in 1983.

== Track listing ==
Side One
No.	Title	Performing Artist	Length
1.	"The Safety Dance"	Men Without Hats
2.	"I Hear Motion"	Models
3.	"Puttin' on the Ritz"	Taco
4.	"Reckless"	Australian Crawl
5.	"Montego Bay"	Allniters
6.	"Suddenly Last Summer"	The Motels
7.	"Words"	F. R. David
8.	"Making Love Out of Nothing at All"	Air Supply
9.	"Love Blonde"	Kim Wilde

Side Two
No.	Title	Performing Artist	Length
1.	"I.O.U."	Freeez
2.	"(She's) Sexy + 17"	Stray Cats
3.	"Who's That Girl?"	Eurythmics
4.	"Just Got Lucky"	JoBoxers
5.	"Tonight I Celebrate My Love"	Peabo Bryson and Roberta Flack
6.	"Soldier of Fortune"	John Paul Young
7.	"Made My Day"	Tim Finn
8.	"Life Gets Better"	Graham Parker
9.	"Nobody's Diary"	Yazoo

== Charts ==
Chart (1983)	Peak position
Australia (Kent Music Report)	1
