= Thru the Roof '83 =

Thru The Roof '83

Compilation album by Various Artists
- Released: November 1983
- Genre: Pop
- Label: CBS

Thru The Roof '83 was a various artists "hits" collection album released in Australia in early December 1983 on the CBS record Label (Cat No. ROOF 1). The album spent 5 weeks at the top of the Australian album charts in Dec. 1983 / Jan. 1984.

== Track listing ==
Side 1:

- 1 Pat Wilson – "Bop Girl"
- 2 Dragon – "Rain"
- 3 Culture Club – "Karma Chameleon"
- 4 UB40 – "Red Red Wine"
- 5 Paul Young – "Wherever I Lay My Hat"
- 6 Mike Oldfield – "Moonlight Shadow"
- 7 Sharon O'Neill – "Maxine"
- 8 Malcolm McLaren – "Double Dutch"
- 9 Michael Sembello – "Maniac"

Side 2:

- 1 Billy Joel – "Tell Her About It"
- 2 Michael Jackson – "Wanna Be Startin' Somethin'"
- 3 KC & The Sunshine Band – "Give It Up"
- 4 Cold Chisel – "No Sense"
- 5 Elton John – "I Guess That's Why They Call It the Blues"
- 6 Jon English – "Some People (Have All the Fun)"
- 7 Donna Summer – "She Works Hard for the Money"
- 8 The Blues Brothers & Ray Charles – "Shake a Tail Feather"
- 9 Austen Tayshus – "Australiana"

== Charts ==
Chart (1983/84)	Peak position
Australia (Kent Music Report)	1
