= 87 Hits Out =

Compilation album
- Released: April 1987
- Label: Starcall

87 Hits Out was a various artists "hits" collection album released in Australia in 1987 on the Starcall/ BMG-RCA record Label. The album spent 1 week at the top of the Australian album charts in 1987.

== Track listing ==
No.	Title	Performing Artist(s)	Length
1.	"Something in My House"	Dead or Alive
2.	"You Keep Me Hangin' On"	Kim Wilde
3.	"Pressure Down"	John Farnham
4.	"Like Flames"	Berlin
5.	"It Didn't Matter"	The Style Council
6.	"Bizarre Love Triangle"	New Order
7.	"Heartbreak Beat"	The Psychedelic Furs
8.	"I Want to Wake Up with You"	Boris Gardiner
9.	"I Knew You Were Waiting (For Me)"	Aretha Franklin & George Michael
10.	"Graceland"	Paul Simon
11.	"The Final Countdown"	Europe
12.	"Is This Love?"	Alison Moyet
13.	"Livin' on a Prayer"	Bon Jovi
14.	"Sugar Free"	Wa Wa Nee
15.	"Rooms for the Memory"	Michael Hutchence
16.	"Word Up!"	Cameo
17.	"Shake You Down"	Gregory Abbott

== Charts ==
Chart (1987)	Peak position
Australia (Kent Music Report)	1
