= 1982 with a Bullet =

Compilation album by various artists
- Released: 1982
- Genre: Pop
- Label: EMI

1982 with a Bullet was a 1982 various artists "hits" album released in Australia on EMI (Catalogue No. LP EMI GIVE 2005). The album spent 5 weeks as #1 on the Australian Album charts in 1982. In September 2009 the album was voted by listeners of Hobart radio station 7HO as the best compilation album of all time.

== Track listing ==
Side one
No.	Title	Performing artist	Length
1.	"Centerfold"	The J. Geils Band	3:35
2.	"Just Can't Get Enough"	Depeche Mode	3:36
3.	"Homosapien"	Pete Shelley	4:33
4.	"Make a Move on Me"	Olivia Newton-John	3:15
5.	"My Own Way"	Duran Duran	3:35
6.	"Dirty Creature"	Split Enz	3:58
7.	"Almost with You"	The Church	4:11
8.	"Why Do Fools Fall in Love"	Diana Ross	2:52
9.	"The Lion Sleeps Tonight"	Tight Fit	3:07

Side two
No.	Title	Performing artist	Length
1.	"What About Me"	Moving Pictures	3:28
2.	"Cambodia"	Kim Wilde	3:45
3.	"Berserk Warriors"	Mental As Anything	3:49
4.	"Golden Brown"	The Stranglers	3:28
5.	"Let's Hang On"	Barry Manilow	3:08
6.	"Mickey"	Toni Basil	3:38
7.	"Come Back Suzanne"	Bill Wyman	2:52
8.	"Body and Soul"	Jo Kennedy	3:35
9.	"Daddy's Home"	Cliff Richard	2:56

== Track origins ==
- "Why Do Fools Fall in Love" by Diana Ross was first recorded by US group Frankie Lymon & The Teenagers in 1956.
- "The Lion Sleeps Tonight" by Tight Fit was originally made famous by US group The Tokens in 1961.
- "Let's Hang On" by Barry Manilow was originally made famous by US group The Four Seasons in 1965.
- "Mickey" by Toni Basil was first recorded by UK pop group Racey in 1979 (a.k.a. "Kitty").
- "Body and Soul" by Jo Kennedy was originally from the 1982 Australian film, Starstruck and was originally recorded by Split Enz as “She Got Body She Got Soul” in 1979.

=== Charts ===
Chart (1982)	Peak position
Australia (Kent Music Report)	1
