= 88 the Winners =

88 The Winners

Compilation album by various artists
- Released: September 1988
- Genre: Pop, rock
- Label: WEA

88 The Winners was a various artists "hits" collection album released in Australia in 1988 on the WEA record Label. The album spent 4 weeks at the top of the Australian album charts in 1988. It was released on LP with 16 tracks, and on CD and cassette with 18 tracks.

== Track listing ==
Side One
No.	Title	Performing Artist	Length
1.	"New Sensation"	INXS
2.	"I Owe You Nothing"	Bros
3.	"The Perfect Day"	Fischer-Z
4.	"Don't Be Cruel"	Cheap Trick
5.	"Nothin' but a Good Time"	Poison
6.	"Theme from S'Express"	S'Express
7.	"Push It"	Salt-N-Pepa
8.	"Doctorin' the Tardis"	The Timelords
9.	"Prove Your Love" (non-LP track)	Taylor Dayne

Side Two
No.	Title	Performing Artist	Length
1.	"Perfect"	Fairground Attraction
2.	"I Saw Him Standing There"	Tiffany
3.	"Make Me Lose Control"	Eric Carmen
4.	"Don't Go"	Hothouse Flowers
5.	"Man with a Gun" (Radio Edit)	Jerry Harrison
6.	"I Don't Wanna Go On with You Like That"	Elton John
7.	"That's When I Think of You"	1927
8.	"Age of Reason"	John Farnham
9.	"Foolish Beat" (non-LP track)	Debbie Gibson

== Charts ==
Chart (1988)	Peak position
Australia (ARIA Charts)	1
