= The Best of Joe Cocker (1983 album) =

Greatest hits album by Joe Cocker
- Released: 1983
- Genre: Rock
- Label: EMI

The Best of Joe Cocker is a compilation album of hits by English singer Joe Cocker released in 1983 by EMI in Australia. The album spent three weeks at the top of the Australian album charts in 1983.

== Track listing ==
1. "With a Little Help from My Friends"
2. "Delta Lady"
3. "Feeling Alright"
4. "The Letter"
5. "She Came In Through the Bathroom Window"
6. "High Time We Went"
7. "Darling Be Home Soon"
8. "Sweet Little Woman"
9. "I Can Stand a Little Rain"
10. "Up Where We Belong"
11. "Hitchcock Railway"
12. "You Are So Beautiful"
13. "Put Out the Light"
14. "Something"
15. "Marjorine"
16. "Guilty"
17. "Dear Landlord"
18. "Just Like a Woman"

== Chart positions ==
Year	Chart	Position
1983	Australian Kent Music Report Albums Chart	1
