= 1985 Comes Alive =

Compilation album by various artists
- Released: February 1985
- Genre: Pop
- Label: Festival Records

1985 Comes Alive was a various artists "hits" collection album released in Australia in late 1984 on the EMI record Label (Cat No. GIVE 1985). The album spent four weeks at the top of the Australian album charts in 1985.

== Track listing ==
Side One
No.	Title	Performing Artist	Length
1.	"The Wild Boys"	Duran Duran
2.	"Sexcrime (Nineteen Eighty-Four)"	Eurythmics
3.	"Caribbean Queen (No More Love on the Run)"	Billy Ocean
4.	"One Night in Bangkok"	Murray Head
5.	"Cruel Summer"	Bananarama
6.	"If This Is It"	Huey Lewis and the News
7.	"NeverEnding Story"	Limahl
8.	"Strut"	Sheena Easton
9.	"The Unforgettable Fire"	U2

Side Two
No.	Title	Performing Artist	Length
1.	"The Power of Love"	Frankie Goes to Hollywood
2.	"It Ain't Enough"	Corey Hart
3.	"We Belong"	Pat Benatar
4.	"Guardian Angel"	Masquerade
5.	"Private Dancer"	Tina Turner
6.	"Big on Love"	Models
7.	"Life's a Gamble"	The Radiators
8.	"Singing in the Shower"	Solid Citizens
9.	"I'm Tuff"	George Smilovici

== Charts ==
Chart (1985)	Peak position
Australia (Kent Music Report)	1
