= Throbbin' '84 =

Compilation album by Various Artists
- Released: April 1984
- Genre: Pop, rock, new wave
- Label: Polygram

Throbbin' '84 is a various artists "hits" compilation album released in Australia in 1984 on the Polygram record label. The album spent 5 weeks at the top of the Australian album charts in 1984.

== Track listing ==
Side 1:

1. "Girls Just Want to Have Fun" - Cyndi Lauper
2. "Blue Day" - Mi-Sex
3. "Talking in Your Sleep" - The Romantics
4. "Cum On Feel the Noize" - Quiet Riot
5. "Just Be Good to Me" - The S.O.S. Band
6. "Break My Stride" - Matthew Wilder
7. "Calling Your Name" - Marilyn
8. "Kiss the Bride" - Elton John
9. "Sticky Music" - Sandii & the Sunsetz

Side 2:

1. "Jump" - Van Halen
2. "Beast of Burden" - Bette Midler
3. "All Night Long (All Night)" - Lionel Richie
4. "In a Big Country" - Big Country
5. "The Lovecats" - The Cure
6. "Original Sin" - INXS
7. "Love of the Common People" - Paul Young
8. "Come Said the Boy" - Mondo Rock
9. "Thriller" - Michael Jackson

== Charts ==
Chart (1984)	Peak position
Australia (Kent Music Report)	1
