= Go for It (compilation album) =

Go for It 1983

Compilation album by Various Artists
- Released: March 1983
- Genre: Pop, rock
- Label: CBS

Go for It 1983 was a various artists "hits" collection album released in Australia in 1983 (Cat No. GO 1). The album spent 1 week at the top of the Australian album charts in 1983.

== Track listing ==
=== Side 1 ===
1. "Living on the Ceiling" – Blancmange
2. "Hey Little Girl" – Icehouse
3. "Love My Way" – The Psychedelic Furs
4. "Do You Really Want to Hurt Me" – Culture Club
5. "Zoom" – Fat Larry's Band
6. "The Traveller" – Big Red
7. "Jackie Wilson Said (I'm in Heaven When You Smile)" – Dexys Midnight Runners
8. "Stand Up" – The Angels
9. "Peek-a-Boo" – Devo

=== Side 2 ===
1. "Gloria" – Laura Branigan
2. "Down the Line" – Mi-Sex
3. "Shock the Monkey" – Peter Gabriel
4. "Don't Change" – INXS
5. "Back on the Chain Gang" – The Pretenders
6. "Twisting by the Pool" – Dire Straits
7. "Close Again" – Mental as Anything
8. "Africa" – Toto
9. "Truly" – Lionel Richie

== Charts ==
Chart (1983)	Peak position
Australia (Kent Music Report)	1

== Certifications and sales ==
Region	Certification	Certified units/sales
Australia (ARIA)	3× Platinum	150,000^{^}
^{^} Shipments figures based on certification alone.
