= Keep On Dancing (album) =

Keep on Dancing

Compilation album by Various Artists
- Released: July 1983
- Genre: Pop, rock
- Label: EMI Music

Keep on Dancing was a various artists "hits" collection album released in Australia in 1983 on the EMI record Label (Cat No. GIVE 2008). The album spent 3 weeks at the top of the Australian album charts in 1983.

== Track listing ==
Side 1:

- Duran Duran - "Is There Something I Should Know?"
- Rick Springfield - "Affair of the Heart"
- Hot Chocolate - "What Kinda' Boy You're Lookin' For (Girl)"
- Eurythmics - "Love Is a Stranger"
- Real Life - "Send Me an Angel" (Extended dance mix)
- Kajagoogoo - "Oohh To Be Ah"
- Sylvester - "Do Ya Wanna Funk"
- The Honeymoon - "Love Wakes Up"
- Bananarama - "Na Na Hey Hey Kiss Him Goodbye"

Side 2:

- Naked Eyes - "(There's) Always Something There to Remind Me"
- The Greg Kihn Band - "Jeopardy"
- Haysi Fantayzee - "Shiny Shiny"
- Flash and the Pan - "Waiting for a Train" (French take)
- Toto Coelo - "Dracula's Tango (Sucker for Your Love)"
- George Clinton - "Atomic Dog"
- The Radiators - "No Tragedy"
- Thomas Dolby - "She Blinded Me with Science" (Extended dance mix)

== Charts ==
| Chart (1983) | Peak position |
|---|---|
| Australia (Kent Music Report) | 1 |
