= 1983 The Hot Ones =

Compilation album by Various artists
- Released: May 1983
- Genre: Pop
- Label: Festival Records

1983 The Hot Ones was a various artists "hits" compilation album released in Australia in 1983 by Festival Records. The album spent four weeks at the top of the Australian album charts in 1983.

== Track listing ==
Side One
No.	Title	Performing Artist	Length
1.	"White Wedding"	Billy Idol
2.	"Don't Pay the Ferryman"	Chris de Burgh
3.	"I Eat Cannibals"	Toto Coelo
4.	"Shoop Shoop Diddy Wop Cumma Cumma Wang Dang"	Monte Video and the Cassettes
5.	"The Clapping Song"	The Belle Stars
6.	"Our House"	Madness
7.	"She Blinded Me with Science"	Thomas Dolby
8.	"The Message"	Grandmaster Flash and the Furious Five
9.	"Science Fiction"	Divinyls
10.	"Hooked on Hooks"	Skyhooks

Side Two
No.	Title	Performing Artist	Length
1.	"Too Shy"	Kajagoogoo
2.	"Heartbreaker"	Dionne Warwick
3.	"Up Where We Belong"	Joe Cocker & Jennifer Warnes
4.	"I Could Be So Good for You"	Dennis Waterman
5.	"The Other Guy"	Little River Band
6.	"Steppin' Out"	Joe Jackson
7.	"It's Raining Again"	Supertramp
8.	"Ain't No Pleasing You"	Chas & Dave
9.	"Wot?"	Captain Sensible
10.	"Can't Take My Eyes Off You"	Boys Town Gang

== Charts ==
Chart (1983)	Peak position
Australia (Kent Music Report)	1
