= H'its Huge '84 =

Compilation album by various artists
- Released: August 1984
- Genre: Pop
- Label: CBS Records

H'its Huge '84 was a various artists "hits" collection album released in Australia in 1984 on the CBS record Label (Cat No. HUGE 001). The album spent 5 weeks at the top of the Australian album charts in 1984. On 17 August 2018, Brent James has compiled and released a new compilation using similar artwork and paying homage to H'its Huge '84, but instead calling the 3-CD set H'its Huge - Rare and Recycled". Featuring a collection of hard to get on CD tracks from the 80s.

== Track listing ==
1. "Wake Me Up Before You Go-Go" - Wham!
2. "Miss Me Blind" - Culture Club
3. "Sad Songs (Say So Much)" - Elton John
4. "What Is Love" - Howard Jones
5. "I Send a Message" - INXS
6. "Breakin'... There's No Stopping Us" - Ollie & Jerry
7. "Breakdance" - Irene Cara
8. "Holiday" - Madonna
9. "No More Words" - Berlin

Side 2:

1. "Big Girls" - Electric Pandas
2. "Taking the Town" - Icehouse
3. "Cry" - Dragon
4. "Wouldn't It Be Good" - Nik Kershaw
5. "Oh Sherrie" - Steve Perry
6. "Heaven (Must Be There)" - Eurogliders
7. "Dance Hall Days" - Wang Chung
8. "I've Been to Bali Too" - Redgum
9. "Time After Time" - Cyndi Lauper

== Charts ==
Chart (1984)	Peak position
Australia (Kent Music Report)	1
