= The Breakers '83 =

Compilation album by Various artists
- Released: August 1983
- Genre: Pop; rock
- Label: Polygram Records

The Breakers '83 was a various artists "hits" collection album released in Australia in 1983 on the Polygram record Label. The album spent 2 weeks at the top of the Australian album charts in 1983.

== Track listing ==
=== Side 1 ===
- "Beat It" by Michael Jackson
- "Der Kommissar" by After the Fire
- "I'm Still Standing" by Elton John
- "Buffalo Gals" by Malcolm McLaren
- "Wham Rap" by Wham!
- "Little Red Corvette" by Prince
- "Black and White" by INXS
- "Overkill" by Men at Work
- "Street Cafe" by Icehouse

=== Side 2 ===
- "Solitaire" by Laura Branigan
- "The Walls Came Down" by The Call
- "Stand Back" by Stevie Nicks
- "Let's Go to Bed" by The Cure
- "Mad World" by Tears for Fears
- "Speak Like a Child" by The Style Council
- "Candy Girl" by New Edition
- "It's Raining Men" by The Weather Girls
- "Total Eclipse of the Heart" by Bonnie Tyler

== Charts ==
Chart (1983)	Peak position
Australia (Kent Music Report)	1
