= Hit Pix '88 =

Compilation album by Various Artists
- Released: March 1988
- Genre: Pop, rock
- Label: Festival Records

Hit Pix 88 was a various artists "hits" collection album released in Australia in 1988 on the Festival Records (Cat No. 50013). The album spent 2 weeks at the top of the Australian album charts in 1988.

== Track listing ==
Side 1

1. Belinda Carlisle - "Heaven Is a Place on Earth"
2. Kylie Minogue - "I Should Be So Lucky"
3. Richard Marx - "Should've Known Better"
4. Steve Winwood - "Valerie"
5. The Triffids - "Bury Me Deep in Love"
6. Icehouse - "Man of Colours"
7. Cliff Richard - "Some People"
8. M|A|R|R|S - "Pump Up the Volume"
9. Morris Minor and the Majors - "Stutter Rap"

Side 2

1. AC/DC - "Heatseeker"
2. The Choirboys - "Boys Will Be Boys"
3. James Reyne - "Rip It Up"
4. Paul Kelly - "Forty Miles to Saturday Night"
5. Martha Davis - "Don't Tell Me the Time"
6. Divinyls - "Back to the Wall"
7. Jimmy Barnes - "Driving Wheels"
8. Billy Idol - "Mony Mony"
9. The Angels - "Am I Ever Gonna See Your Face Again"

== Charts ==
Chart (1988)	Peak position
Australia (Kent Music Report)	1

== See also ==
- List of number-one albums in Australia during the 1980s
