= Hold On to Me (The Black Sorrows song) =

Single by The Black Sorrows

from the album Hold On to Me
- Released: 5 September 1988
- Genre: Rock
- Length: 3:51
- Label: CBS
- Songwriter(s): Joe Camilleri; Nick Smith
- Producer(s): Jeff Burstin, Joe Camilleri

The Black Sorrows singles chronology
| "The Last Frontier" (1987) | "Hold On to Me" (1988) | "The Chosen Ones" (1988) |

"Hold On to Me" is a song by Australian blues and rock band The Black Sorrows. It was released as the first single from their fifth studio album Hold On to Me. It peaked at number 41 in October 1988.

The song was covered by John Denver in his 1991 Different Directions album.

== Track listing ==
7" single (CBS 652906-7)

1. "Hold On to Me" – 3:51
2. "Safe in the Arms of Love" – 3:01

== Charts ==
| Chart (1988) | Peak position |
|---|---|
| Australia (ARIA) | 41 |
