= '88 Kix On =

88 Kix On

Compilation album by Various artists
- Released: June 1988
- Genre: Pop, rock
- Length: 73:29
- Label: Polystar

'88 Kix On is a various artists compilation album released in Australia in June 1988 on the Polystar record Label (catalogue number 816 762 1). It spent two weeks at the top of the Australian albums chart in 1988. It was issued on a vinyl LP with 16 tracks and on cassette and CD with 18 tracks.

== Track listing ==
1. "Get Outta My Dreams, Get into My Car – Billy Ocean (4:42)
2. "Groove" – Eurogliders (4:02)
3. "Boys (Summertime Love)" – Sabrina (3:52)
4. "When Will I Be Famous?" – Bros (3:59)
5. "My Arms Keep Missing You" – Rick Astley (3:13)
6. "Sweet Little Mystery" – Wet Wet Wet (3:44)
7. "Shake Your Love" – Debbie Gibson (3:40)
8. "Sign Your Name" – Terence Trent D'Arby (4:36)
9. "You're Not Alone" – Australian Olympians (5:10)^^
10. "Heaven Knows" – Robert Plant (4:05)^^
11. "Underneath the Radar" – Underworld (4:02)
12. "Tell It to My Heart" – Taylor Dayne (3:41)
13. "The Flame" – Cheap Trick (4:40)
14. "I Want You Back" – Bananarama (3:46)
15. "Love Is a Bridge" – Little River Band (4:04)
16. "Could've Been" – Tiffany (3:33)
17. "(Sittin' On) The Dock of the Bay" – Michael Bolton (3:53)
18. "Where Do Broken Hearts Go" – Whitney Houston (4:37)

^^ = Tracks only on CD and cassette versions, not on LP version

== Charts ==
Chart (1988)	Peak position
Australia (Kent Music Report)	1
