= Hold On to Me (album) =

Studio album by The Black Sorrows
- Released: 27 September 1988
- Recorded: 1987−88
- Studio: Sing Sing Studios
- Genres: Folk rock; pop rock
- Length: 43:36
- Label: CBS Records
- Producers: Jeff Burstin, Joe Camilleri

The Black Sorrows chronology
Dear Children (1987)	Hold On to Me (1988)	Harley and Rose (1990)

Singles from Hold on to Me
- 1. "Hold On to Me" Released: 5 September 1988; 2. "The Chosen Ones" Released: October 1988; 3. "Chained to the Wheel" Released: February 1989; 4. "The Crack Up" Released: 1 May 1989; 5. "Fire Down Below" Released: August 1989

Hold On to Me is the fifth studio album by Australian rock band The Black Sorrows. It's the group's first album to feature the vocals of Vika and Linda Bull.

== Reception ==
Professional ratings
Review scores
Source	Rating
AllMusic	4.5/5 stars

Rudyard Kennedy from AllMusic gave the album a positive review saying; "[Joe] Camilleri and company may borrow many of the same ingredients that James Morrison uses to make his music -- blues, soul, and R&B, as well as flashes of gospel, country, folk, and even Brill building pop -- but the trick is in mixing those well-worn ingredients together and coming up with something new. That's where Black Sorrows show that they're fit to be mentioned in the same breath with artists like Van Morrison and the Rolling Stones. Every song on Hold On to Me sounds like it could be a classic (and classy) radio staple, without sounding like a copy of anything else. Not only is Hold On to Me's literate songwriting (by Camilleri and lyricist Nick Smith) superb, but the playing is also uniformly excellent (and, at times, positively inspired), and vocalists Camilleri and Vika and Linda Bull are soulful and gritty throughout. Hold On to Me deserves to be remembered as more than just an Australian classic -- this is a record that deserves to be heard and hailed by music fans the world over."

== Track listing ==
All tracks are written by Joe Camilleri and Nick Smith.

No.	Title	Length
1.	"The Chosen Ones"	4:06
2.	"The Crack Up"	3:24
3.	"Chained to the Wheel"	4:00
4.	"In the Hands of the Enemy"	4:33
5.	"Raise That Lantern"	6:29
6.	"Hold on to Me"	3:51
7.	"Glorybound"	3:48
8.	"Fire Down Below"	4:08
9.	"Sleep Through the Hurricane"	4:46
10.	"The Story Never Changes"	4:36
11.	"One Driver"	3:19
12.	"Waiting for the Rain"	5:03
13.	"Mercenary Heart"	3:09
14.	"Kiss the Motherlode"	5:02
15.	"Before the Shooting Starts"	3:24
16.	"Safe in the Arms of Love"	3:02

The North American version of Hold On To Me consists of tracks 1–10 only, with changes in ordering of the tracks and a few subtle differences in the mixes.

== Personnel ==
Black Sorrows

- Linda Bull – backing vocals
- Vika Bull – backing vocals
- Mick Girasole – bass
- Peter Luscombe – drums, percussion
- Wayne Burt – guitar
- Jeff Burstin – guitar, slide guitar, mandolin
- Joe Camilleri (aka Joey Vincent) – saxophone, vocals, slide guitar

Additional personnel

- George Butrumlis – accordion
- Gerry Hale – banjo
- Bob Venier – brass
- John Barrett – brass
- Tony Norris – brass
- Lucky Oceans – guitar
- Sam See – guitar
- Tony Faeshe – guitar
- Jason Bradley – harmonica
- James Black – keyboards
- Mick O'Connor – keyboards
- Paul Grabowsky – keyboards
- R. Starcic – keyboards
- Alex Pertout – percussion
- Joe Creighton – vocals
- Lisa Edwards – vocals
- Nick Smith – vocals
- Venetta Fields – vocals

Technical personnel

- Richard Lewis – graphic design
- Graeme Fraser – engineering
- Martin Pullan – engineering, mixing
- Doug Brady – mixing
- Ian "Mac" MacKenzie – mixing
- Ross Cockle – mixing
- Tomic – photography
- Jeff Burstin – production
- Joe Camilleri – production

== Charts ==
=== Weekly charts ===
Chart (1988/89)	Peak position
Australian Albums (ARIA)	7
New Zealand Albums (RMNZ)	36
Norwegian Albums (VG-lista)	5
Swedish Albums (Sverigetopplistan)	18

=== Year-end charts ===
Chart (1989)	Rank
Australian Albums (ARIA)	14
Australian Artist Albums (ARIA)	4
