= The Venetians (band) =

Mid-1980s pop music band

Venetians
- Origin: Sydney, New South Wales, Australia
- Genres: Rock; synthpop; new wave
- Years active: 1982–1989
- Labels: Parole; Festival; Chrysalis
- Past members: Rik Swinn; David Skeet; Peter Watson; Tim Powles; Matthew Hughes; Steve Bull; Lee Borkman

Venetians was an Australian new-wave act formed in 1982 by English-born David Skeet (guitarist) when he and Peter Watson (guitarist and bassist) joined up with, lead vocalist, Rik Swinn. They enlisted Matthew Hughes on keyboards (ex-Gotham City); Tim Powles on drums (ex-Ward 13). They issued three studio albums, Step Off the Edge (May 1985), Calling in the Lions (June 1986) and Amazing World (1988). They had top 30 hit singles in Australia with "So Much for Love" (December 1985), "Inspiration" (March 1986) and "Bitter Tears" (May 1988). The group agreed to go their separate ways in 1989.

== Biography ==
The Venetians were formed in late 1982 as a studio concept band after Rik Swinn (lead vocalist) arrived in Sydney with master tapes of tracks he recorded in England with Vic Coppersmith-Heaven producing. He read a newspaper advert placed by two musicians looking for a lead singer. Within weeks Rik joined David Skeet (ex-AutoTango) on guitar, bass, synthesiser and vocals; and Peter Watson (ex-Scandal, Extractors) on guitar, bass, synthesiser and vocals. Drummer Tim Powles (ex-Ward 13) joined next and keyboardist Matthew Hughes (ex-Gotham City) completed the line up of the Venetians by July 1983.

"The chemistry was definitely there from the beginning," says Swinn.

The Venetians released their first single, "Sound on Sound", in April 1983, which is a version of Swinn's original demo. The track was written by Swinn. The band signed with Festival Records' Parole Records label. It was accompanied by a music video which attracted airplay, "Sound on Sound", and reached the Kent Music Report Singles Chart top 100. It was regarded as a 'turntable hit' following airplay on national radio station, Triple J. Their second single, "Chinese I's (Here Come the Minute Men)" (November 1983), which The Canberra Times' writer observed, "is being heard lots at the moment, both on television and on radio," while the band began to build their reputation as a live act on the pub circuit.

The Venetians released their debut album, Step Off the Edge, in May 1985, which was produced by Coppersmith-Heaven. Australian musicologist, Ian McFarlane, observed, "[they] began to transcend their cult following" while the album was, "somewhat tentative." They released "Ooh La La" (November 1984) as its lead single. They supported Split Enz on the Australian leg of their Enz with a Bang farewell tour in October–November 1984. This led to tours supporting Icehouse and Nik Kershaw. By 1985 they were an Australian live attraction in their own right. The band released the album's second single, "Shine the Light" (February 1985), which reached the top 100.

Near the end of 1985 the Venetians went into the studio with producer Mark Opitz to record two tracks, which were issued as their next single, "So Much for Love" (December 1985). The band started working with producer, Peter Blyton, on their second album, Calling in the Lions (June 1986). "So Much For Love" peaked at number three on the national charts in March. The Venetians embarked on a two-month Australian tour, with the Church, and released a follow-up single, "Inspiration" (March 1986), which reached the top 20. Lisa Wallace of The Canberra Times opined that the two singles, "are undoubtedly the best parts of this album. Casting them aside, [it] slows a little, although there's some good, solid rock and striking harmonies there to be found."

A third single, "If Somebody Loves You" (June 1986), was issued from Calling in the Lions. The album and "So Much for Love" were re-released via Chrysalis Records in the United States in 1987. The single was issued with a remixed by Robert Racic and Stephen Orkins as well as an extended Rock Mix, which reached number one on the Chicago Dance Chart. "One from the Heart", track 3, on both the US and Australian pressings was picked up for used in an episode of Miami Vice in 1986. Music videos were provided for "So Much for Love", "Inspiration" and "If Somebody Loves You" for MTV in the US. All three were directed by Alex Proyas (Crowded House, INXS), a film director whose credits include, The Crow and Dark City.

With the departure of Matthew Hughes in 1987, the Venetians spent the next year as a four-piece recording their third album, Amazing World (July 1988), with producer Mark Goldenberg and later Mark Opitz. The album was mixed at Electric Lady Studios in New York by Michael Frondelli who had worked with Billy Idol and Pat Benatar. It provided three singles, "Amazing World" (November 1987), "Bitter Tears" (May 1988) and "Must Believe" (September). "Bitter Tears" reached the ARIA Singles Chart top 30 while Amazing World peaked in the top 50 on the related ARIA Albums Chart. In July 1988 the band called in Steve Bull on bass guitar and Lee Borkman on keyboards. . The band felt they could no longer continue with this line up and disbanded in the following year.

Tim Powles became the drummer for Scribble (1985–86), the Divinyls (1989), Angry Anderson Band (1990) and the Church (1994–present). With that group he is involved in band management and recording, he produced three of their albums. David Skeet moved to the US in 1990 and worked as a producer and recording artist while signed to MCA Music in Los Angeles and Epic Records in New York. Skeet returned to Sydney in 1999 and continued to produce records, including projects at Powles' Spacejunk studio. He later produced and developed artists through his own production company, Skeet Music and was under contract with Universal Music Publishing. Peter Watson lived in Sydney, and worked in the finance industry. He sometimes performed with singer, Louise Anton.

== Members ==
- Rik Swinn – lead vocals (1982–89)
- David Skeet – guitar, bass guitar, synthesiser, vocals (1983–89)
- Peter Watson – bass guitar, guitar, synthesiser, vocals (1983–89)
- Tim Powles – drums (1983–89)
- Matthew Hughes – keyboards (1983–87)
- Steve Bull – bass guitar (1988)
- Lee Borkman – keyboards (1988)

== Discography ==
=== Studio albums ===
List of albums, with selected details and chart positions
Title	Album details	Peak chart positions
Title	Album details	AUS
Step off the Edge	Released: May 1985; Format: LP, Cassette; Label: Parole, Festival (L 38226)	97
Calling in the Lions	Released: June 1986; Format: LP, Cassette; Label: Parole, Festival (RML 53204)	33
Amazing World	Released: July 1988; Format: LP, cassette, CD; Label: Parole, Festival (L 38911)	41

=== Singles ===
Year	Title	Peak chart positions			Album
Year	Title	AUS	US	US Dance	Album
April 1983	"Sound on Sound"	85	–	–	Non-LP singles
November 1983	"Chinese I's (Here Come The Minute Men)"	63	–	–	Non-LP singles
November 1984	"Ooh La La"	–	–	–	Step Off The Edge
February 1985	"Shine the Light"	91	–	–	Step Off The Edge
December 1985	"So Much for Love"	3	88	35	Calling In The Lions
March 1986	"Inspiration"	19	–	–	Calling In The Lions
June 1986	"If Somebody Loves You"	67	–	–	Calling In The Lions
October 1986	"Let It All Go"	–	–	–	Calling In The Lions
June 1987	"Amazing World"	77	–	–	Amazing World
May 1988	"Bitter Tears"	24	–	–	Amazing World
September 1988	"Must Believe"	82	–	–	Amazing World
