= List of top 40 albums for 1980–1989 in Australia =

The following lists the top 100 (end of decade) charting albums on the Australian Album Charts, for the 1980s. These were the best charting albums in Australia for the 1980s. The source for this decade is the Kent Music Report, known from 1987 onwards as the Australian Music Report.

#	Title	Artist	Highest pos. reached	Date reached
1.	Whispering Jack	John Farnham	1	November 1986
2.	Brothers in Arms	Dire Straits	1	May 1985
3.	Thriller	Michael Jackson	1	June 1983
4.	Born in the U.S.A.	Bruce Springsteen	1	October 1984
5.	Whitney Houston	Whitney Houston	1	June 1986
6.	Can't Slow Down	Lionel Richie	1	June 1984
7.	Too Low for Zero	Elton John	2	August 1983
8.	10, 9, 8, 7, 6, 5, 4, 3, 2, 1	Midnight Oil	3	December 1982
9.	Business as Usual	Men at Work	1	December 1981
10.	Kick	INXS	1	October 1988
11.	Graceland	Paul Simon	1	October 1986
12.	An Innocent Man	Billy Joel	3	November 1983
13.	Revenge	Eurythmics	2	August 1986
14.	Crowded House	Crowded House	1	June 1987
15.	Love over Gold	Dire Straits	1	October 1982
16.	Colour by Numbers	Culture Club	1	October 1983
17.	No Jacket Required	Phil Collins	1	May 1985
18.	Like a Virgin	Madonna	2	January 1985
19.	The Swing	INXS	1	April 1984
20.	The Joshua Tree	U2	3	March 1987
21.	Little Creatures	Talking Heads	2	August 1985
22.	Back in Black	AC/DC	1	March 1981
23.	Man of Colours	Icehouse	1	October 1987
24.	For the Working Class Man	Jimmy Barnes	1	December 1985
25.	Slippery When Wet	Bon Jovi	1	July 1987
26.	The Lonesome Jubilee	John Cougar Mellencamp	2	May 1988
27.	She's So Unusual	Cyndi Lauper	3	February 1985
28.	East	Cold Chisel	2	June 1980
29.	The Wall	Pink Floyd	1	March 1980
30.	Tracy Chapman	Tracy Chapman	3	June 1988
31.	Chariots of Fire	Vangelis	5	May 1982
32.	The Dream of the Blue Turtles	Sting	1	April 1986
33.	Tango in the Night	Fleetwood Mac	5	November 1987
34.	Scarecrow	John Cougar Mellencamp	2	July 1986
35.	Sirocco	Australian Crawl	1	August 1981
36.	True Blue	Madonna	1	August 1986
37.	Dirty Dancing	Original Soundtrack	1	October 1986
38.	...ish	1927	1	May 1989
39.	Invisible Touch	Genesis	3	July 1986
40.	Volume One	Traveling Wilburys	1	February 1989
41.	Glass Houses	Billy Joel	2	May 1980
42.	Double Fantasy	John Lennon & Yoko Ono	1	Dec 1980
43.	The Bridge	Billy Joel	2	Oct 1986
44.	Be Yourself Tonight	Eurythmics	1	Jul 1985
45.	The Boys Light Up	Australian Crawl	4	Sep 1980
46.	Diesel and Dust	Midnight Oil	1	Aug 1987
47.	Reckless	Bryan Adams	2	Oct 1985
48.	Heavy Nova	Robert Palmer	2	Feb 1989
49.	Tattoo You	The Rolling Stones	1	Sep 1981
50.	True Colours	Split Enz	1	Apr 1980
51.	Listen Like Thieves	INXS	1	Oct 1985
52.	Introducing the Hardline According to Terrence Trent D'Arby	Terrence Trent D'Arby	1	May 1988
53.	Age of Reason	John Farnham	1	Aug 1988
54.	Let's Dance	David Bowie	1	Apr 1983
55.	Rattle and Hum	U2	1	Oct 1988
56.	Icehouse	Flowers (Icehouse)	4	Nov 1980
57.	Avalon	Roxy Music	1	Jul 1982
58.	Zenyatta Mondatta	The Police	1	Mar 1981
59.	Under a Blood Red Sky	U2	2	Feb 1984
60.	Appetite For Destruction	Guns 'n' Roses	7	Oct 1988
61.	Making Movies	Dire Straits	6	Mar 1981
62.	Days of Innocence	Moving Pictures	1	Mar 1982
63.	Synchronicity	The Police	1	Jul 1983
64.	Off The Wall	Michael Jackson	1	Mar 1980
65.	Greatest Hits Vols. I & II	Billy Joel	2	Aug 1985
66.	Kev's Back	Kevin Bloody Wilson	8	Oct 1986
67.	Whenever You Need Somebody	Rick Astley	1	Apr 1988
68.	Stardust	Willie Nelson	5	Aug 1980
69.	Private Dancer	Tina Turner	7	Sep 1984
70.	Hotter Than July	Stevie Wonder	3	Dec 1980
71.	Guilty	Barbra Streisand	1	Nov 1980
72.	Dare	The Human League	3	Apr 1982
73.	Open Up and Say...Ahh!	Poison	11	Sep 1988
74.	A Momentary Lapse of Reason	Pink Floyd	4	Nov 1987
75.	Faith	George Michael	3	Mar 1988
76.	Push	Bros	4	Aug 1988
77.	Songs From the Big Chair	Tears For Fears	5	May 1985
78.	Flashdance	Original Soundtrack	1	Aug 1983
79.	Freight Train Heart	Jimmy Barnes	1	Dec 1987
80.	Hysteria	Def Leppard	4	Jul 1989
81.	The Raw and the Cooked	Fine Young Cannibals	2	May 1989
82.	Melissa Etheridge	Melissa Etheridge	2	Mar 1989
83.	Stop Making Sense	Talking Heads	9	Nov 1985
84.	Dancing on the Ceiling	Lionel Richie	2	Sep 1986
85.	Whitney	Whitney Houston	1	Jun 1987
86.	Like a Prayer	Madonna	2	Apr 1989
87.	Face Value	Phil Collins	2	Jun 1981
88.	The Rose	Soundtrack Bette Midler	3	May 1980
89.	Edge	Daryl Braithwaite	1	May 1989
90.	Bad Habits	Billy Field	1	Jul 1981
91.	Christopher Cross	Christopher Cross	6	May 1981
92.	Union	Toni Childs	7	Nov 1988
93.	Spirit of Place	Goanna	2	Jan 1983
94.	Madonna	Madonna	10	Aug 1984
95.	Rock a Little	Stevie Nicks	5	June 1986
96.	Can't Stop the Music	Soundtrack Village People	1	June 1980
97.	Red Sails in the Sunset	Midnight Oil	1	November 1984
98.	Bad	Michael Jackson	2	September 1987
99.	1100 Bel Air Place	Julio Iglesias	2	October 1984
100.	Circus Animals	Cold Chisel	1	May 1982

These charts were calculated by David Kent of the Kent Music Report / Australian Music Report and they are based on the number of weeks and position the records reached within the top 100 albums for each week.

== See also ==
- List of Top 40 singles for 1980–89 in Australia
