= List of top 40 singles for 1980–1989 in Australia =

The following lists the top 100 (end of decade) charting singles on the Australian Singles Charts, for the 1980s. These were the best charting singles in Australia for the 1980s. The source for this decade is the Kent Music Report, known from 1987 onwards as the Australian Music Report.

#	Title	Artist	Highest pos. reached	First Week at that position
1.	"Never Gonna Give You Up"	Rick Astley	1	November 1987
2.	"Dancing in the Dark"	Bruce Springsteen	5	September 1984
3.	"Australiana"	Austen Tayshus	1	August 1983
4.	"Like A Prayer"	Madonna	1	April 1989
5.	"I Just Called to Say I Love You"	Stevie Wonder	1	October 1984
6.	"Ghostbusters"	Ray Parker Jr.	2	September 1984
7.	"Islands in the Stream"	Kenny Rogers with Dolly Parton	1	December 1983
8.	"La Bamba"	Los Lobos	1	September 1987
9.	"Locomotion"	Kylie Minogue	1	August 1987
10.	"Down Under"	Men at Work	1	December 1981
11.	"Run to Paradise"	The Choirboys	3	November 1987
12.	"Flashdance... What a Feeling"	Irene Cara	1	July 1983
13.	"Old Time Rock and Roll"	Bob Seger	3	August 1987
14.	"You're the Voice"	John Farnham	1	November 1985
15.	"(I've Had) The Time of My Life"	Bill Medley and Jennifer Warnes	1	February 1988
16.	"We Are the World"	USA for Africa	1	April 1985
17.	"Kokomo"	The Beach Boys	1	December 1988
18.	"Shaddap You Face"	Joe Dolce Music Theatre	1	November 1980
19.	"Gloria"	Laura Branigan	1	February 1983
20.	"The Only Way Is Up"	Yazz and the Plastic Population	2	October 1988
21.	"Walk Like an Egyptian"	The Bangles	1	February 1987
22.	"Electric Blue"	Icehouse	1	November 1987
23.	"Venus"	Bananarama	1	September 1986
24.	"Simply Irresistible"	Robert Palmer	1	September 1988
25.	"Faith"	George Michael	1	December 1987
26.	"I Got You"	Split Enz	1	April 1980
27.	"You Keep Me Hangin' On"	Kim Wilde	1	February 1987
28.	"The Power of Love"	Jennifer Rush	1	November 1985
29.	"Start Me Up"	The Rolling Stones	1	November 1981
30.	"Eternal Flame"	The Bangles	1	June 1989
31.	"Angel"/"Into the Groove"	Madonna	1	June 1985
32.	"Time Warp"	Original Cast, The Rocky Horror Picture Show	3	December 1980
33.	"It's Just Not Cricket"	The Twelfth Man	1	June 1984
34.	"Eye of the Tiger"	Survivor	1	September 1982
35.	"(Just Like) Starting Over"	John Lennon	1	January 1981
36.	"Funkytown"	Pseudo Echo	1	December 1986
37.	"Wired for Sound"	Cliff Richard	2	December 1981
38.	"Come On Eileen"	Dexys Midnight Runners	1	November 1982
39.	"I'm Gonna Be (500 Miles)"	The Proclaimers	1	February 1989
40.	"If I Could"	1927	2	December 1988
41.	"Careless Whisper"	George Michael	1	September 1984
42.	"Lady in Red"	Chris De Burgh	2	December 1986
43.	"Chain Reaction"	Diana Ross	1	April 1986
44.	"Like a Virgin"	Madonna	1	December 1984
45.	"Karma Chameleon"	Culture Club	1	October 1983
46.	"When the Going Gets Tough, The Tough Get Going"	Billy Ocean	1	March 1986
47.	"A Groovy Kind of Love"	Phil Collins	1	November 1988
48.	"Teardrops"	Womack & Womack	1	February 1989
49.	"The Look"	Roxette	1	July 1989
50.	"Touch Me (I Want Your Body)"	Samantha Fox	1	July 1986
51.	"Slice of Heaven"	Dave Dobbyn with Herbs	1	May 1987
52.	"Reckless"	Australian Crawl	1	November 1983
53.	"Tainted Love"	Soft Cell	1	February 1982
54.	"Turning Japanese"	The Vapors	1	June 1980
55.	"She Drives Me Crazy"	Fine Young Cannibals	1	March 1989
56.	"Don't Worry Be Happy"	Bobby McFerrin	1	November 1988
57.	"The Flame"	Cheap Trick	1	May 1988
58.	"Get Outta My Dreams, Get Into My Car"	Billy Ocean	1	April 1988
59.	"Physical"	Olivia Newton-John	1	November 1981
60.	"All Night Long (All Night)"	Lionel Richie	1	December 1981
61.	"Respectable"	Mel and Kim	1	July 1987
62.	"Wind Beneath My Wings"	Bette Midler	1	June 1989
63.	"Billie Jean"	Michael Jackson	1	April 1983
64.	"If I Could Turn Back Time"	Cher	1	November 1989
65.	"Up Where We Belong"	Joe Cocker & Jennifer Warnes	1	March 1983
66.	"We Built This City"	Starship	1	January 1986
67.	"Crazy Little Thing Called Love"	Queen	1	February 1980
68.	"Counting the Beat"	The Swingers	1	March 1981
69.	"Woman in Love"	Barbra Streisand	1	November 1980
70.	"Another Brick in the Wall, Part II"	Pink Floyd	2	April 1980
71.	"Got My Mind Set on You"	George Harrison	1	January 1988
72.	"Brass in Pocket"	The Pretenders	2	May 1980
73.	"Total Eclipse of the Heart"	Bonnie Tyler	1	May 1983
74.	"What About Me"	Moving Pictures	1	March 1982
75.	"Stars on 45"	Stars on 45	1	July 1981
76.	"Wake Me Up Before You Go-Go"	Wham!	1	July 1984
77.	"A Good Heart"	Feargal Sharkey	1	February 1986
78.	"Antmusic"	Adam and the Ants	1	March 1981
79.	"Crazy for You"	Madonna	1	July 1985
80.	"You Can Call Me Al"	Paul Simon	2	November 1986
81.	"Boom Boom (Let's Go Back to My Room)"	Paul Lekakis	1	April 1987
82.	"Bedroom Eyes"	Kate Ceberano	2	June 1989
83.	"Pass the Dutchie"	Musical Youth	1	December 1982
84.	"Endless Love"	Diana Ross & Lionel Richie	1	October 1981
85.	"I Wanna Wake Up with You"	Boris Gardiner	1	March 1987
86.	"Jealous Guy"	Roxy Music	1	May 1981
87.	"More Than I Can Say"	Leo Sayer	1	October 1980
88.	"The Living Years"	Mike and the Mechanics	1	May 1989
89.	"Hold Me Now"	Johnny Logan	4	December 1987
90.	"You Got It (The Right Stuff)"	New Kids on the Block	1	August 1989
91.	"To Be a Lover"	Billy Idol	3	December 1986
92.	"Take My Breath Away"	Berlin	2	September 1986
93.	"Can't Stop the Music"	Village People	1	July 1980
94.	"Perfect"	Fairground Attraction	1	August 1988
95.	"Money For Nothing"	Dire Straits	4	September 1985
96.	"I Should Be So Lucky"	Kylie Minogue	1	March 1988
97.	"The Final Countdown"	Europe	2	April 1987
98.	"Devo Live (EP)"	Devo	1	August 1981
99.	"I Wanna Dance with Somebody (Who Loves Me)"	Whitney Houston	1	June 1987
100.	"Live it Up"	Mental As Anything	2	July 1985

These charts were calculated by David Kent of the Kent Music Report / Australian Music Report and they are based on the number of weeks and position the records reached within the top 100 singles for each week.

== See also ==
- List of top 40 albums for 1980–89 in Australia
