= List of number-one singles in Australia during the 1980s =

Australian number-one singles of the 1980s < 1970s 1990s >

Triple J Hottest 100
- 1989

Australian top 25 singles
- 1980 1981 1982 1983 1984; 1985 1986 1987 1988 1989

Australian top 25 albums
- 1980 1981 1982 1983 1984; 1985 1986 1987 1988 1989

Australian top 40 charts
- singles
- albums

The following lists the number one singles on the Australian Singles Chart, along with other substantial hits, during the 1980s. The source for this decade is the Kent Music Report (retitled as Australian Music Report in 1987), and the ARIA Charts.

== 1980s Australian charts ==
Two sets of charts ran in Australia in the late 1980s. The Kent Music Report began publication in 1974 as Australia's official national charts. From mid-1983, the Australian Recording Industry Association (or ARIA) licensed the Kent Music Report (which was renamed the 'Australian Music Report' in 1987). ARIA commenced compiling its own charts in-house from the week ending 26 June 1988 (a Sunday). These charts ran concurrent to what was by then known as the Australian Music Report. The Australian Music Report charts ceased commercial publishing in 1999.

Both the Kent Music Report / Australian Music Report chart data (1980–1989) and the ARIA chart data (starting from their commencement in mid-1983) are listed below. The Kent Music Report / Australian Music Report chart data is taken from the Australian Chart Book 1970–92, published by David Kent, while the ARIA chart data is taken from australian-charts.com.

The dates given for the Kent Music Report / Australian Music Report are Mondays.

== Kent/Australian Music Report ==
Key
The yellow background indicates the #1 song on the KMR/AMR End of Year Chart
The light blue background indicates the #1 song on the KMR/AMR End of Decade Chart

=== 1980 (Kent Music Report) ===
Date	Artist	Single	Weeks at number one
7 January	The Buggles	"Video Killed the Radio Star"	7 weeks (5 weeks in Dec. 1979)
14 January	The Buggles	"Video Killed the Radio Star"	7 weeks (5 weeks in Dec. 1979)
21 January	Michael Jackson	"Don't Stop 'til You Get Enough"	3 weeks
28 January	Michael Jackson	"Don't Stop 'til You Get Enough"	3 weeks
4 February	Michael Jackson	"Don't Stop 'til You Get Enough"	3 weeks
11 February	KC and the Sunshine Band	"Please Don't Go"	2 weeks
18 February	KC and the Sunshine Band	"Please Don't Go"	2 weeks
25 February	Queen	"Crazy Little Thing Called Love"	7 weeks
3 March	Queen	"Crazy Little Thing Called Love"	7 weeks
10 March	Queen	"Crazy Little Thing Called Love"	7 weeks
17 March	Queen	"Crazy Little Thing Called Love"	7 weeks
24 March	Queen	"Crazy Little Thing Called Love"	7 weeks
31 March	Queen	"Crazy Little Thing Called Love"	7 weeks
7 April	Queen	"Crazy Little Thing Called Love"	7 weeks
14 April	Split Enz	"I Got You"	8 weeks
21 April	Split Enz	"I Got You"	8 weeks
28 April	Split Enz	"I Got You"	8 weeks
5 May	Split Enz	"I Got You"	8 weeks
12 May	Split Enz	"I Got You"	8 weeks
19 May	Split Enz	"I Got You"	8 weeks
26 May	Split Enz	"I Got You"	8 weeks
2 June	Split Enz	"I Got You"	8 weeks
9 June	Rocky Burnette	"Tired of Toein' the Line"	2 weeks
16 June	Rocky Burnette	"Tired of Toein' the Line"	2 weeks
23 June	The Vapors	"Turning Japanese"	2 weeks
30 June	The Vapors	"Turning Japanese"	2 weeks
7 July	Village People	"Can't Stop the Music"	4 weeks
14 July	Village People	"Can't Stop the Music"	4 weeks
21 July	Village People	"Can't Stop the Music"	4 weeks
28 July	Village People	"Can't Stop the Music"	4 weeks
4 August	Lipps Inc.	"Funkytown"	2 weeks
11 August	Lipps Inc.	"Funkytown"	2 weeks
18 August	Genghis Khan	"Moscow"	6 weeks
25 August	Genghis Khan	"Moscow"	6 weeks
1 September	Genghis Khan	"Moscow"	6 weeks
8 September	Genghis Khan	"Moscow"	6 weeks
15 September	Genghis Khan	"Moscow"	6 weeks
22 September	Genghis Khan	"Moscow"	6 weeks
29 September	Diana Ross	"Upside Down"	4 weeks
6 October	Diana Ross	"Upside Down"	4 weeks
13 October	Diana Ross	"Upside Down"	4 weeks
20 October	Diana Ross	"Upside Down"	4 weeks
27 October	Leo Sayer	"More Than I Can Say"	2 weeks
3 November	Leo Sayer	"More Than I Can Say"	2 weeks
10 November	Barbra Streisand	"Woman in Love"	2 weeks
17 November	Barbra Streisand	"Woman in Love"	2 weeks
24 November	Joe Dolce Music Theatre	"Shaddap You Face"	8 weeks
1 December	Joe Dolce Music Theatre	"Shaddap You Face"	8 weeks
8 December	Joe Dolce Music Theatre	"Shaddap You Face"	8 weeks
15 December	Joe Dolce Music Theatre	"Shaddap You Face"	8 weeks
22 December	Joe Dolce Music Theatre	"Shaddap You Face"	8 weeks
29 December	Joe Dolce Music Theatre	"Shaddap You Face"	8 weeks

Other hits
Songs peaking at number two included "Dreaming My Dreams with You" by Colleen Hewett, "Another Brick in the Wall (Part 2)" by Pink Floyd, "Brass in Pocket" by The Pretenders, "Coming Up" by Paul McCartney, "You've Lost That Lovin' Feelin'" by Long John Baldry and Kathi McDonald, "What I Like About You" by The Romantics, "Xanadu" by Olivia Newton-John and Electric Light Orchestra, "Babooshka" by Kate Bush, and "Master Blaster (Jammin')" by Stevie Wonder.

Other hits (with their peak positions noted) were "Space Invaders" (3) by Player One, "Ashes to Ashes" (3) by David Bowie, "Do That to Me One More Time" (3) by Captain & Tennille, "Fame" (3) by Irene Cara, "He's My Number One" (4) by Christie Allen, "Call Me" (4) and "The Tide Is High" (4) by Blondie, "Blame It on the Boogie" (4) by The Jacksons, and "Shandi" (5) by Kiss.

Hits by Australasian artists included "Magic" by Olivia Newton-John, "People" by Mi-Sex, "No Secrets" by The Angels, "You Shook Me All Night Long" by AC/DC and "Can't Help Myself" and "We Can Get Together" by Flowers.

=== 1981 (Kent Music Report) ===
Date	Artist	Single	Weeks at number one
5 January	Joe Dolce Music Theatre	"Shaddap You Face"	8 weeks
12 January	Joe Dolce Music Theatre	"Shaddap You Face"	8 weeks
19 January	John Lennon	"(Just Like) Starting Over"	4 weeks
26 January	John Lennon	"(Just Like) Starting Over"	4 weeks
2 February	John Lennon	"(Just Like) Starting Over"	4 weeks
9 February	John Lennon	"(Just Like) Starting Over"	4 weeks
16 February	Slim Dusty	"Duncan"	2 weeks
23 February	Slim Dusty	"Duncan"	2 weeks
2 March	The Swingers	"Counting the Beat"	3 weeks
9 March	The Swingers	"Counting the Beat"	3 weeks
16 March	The Swingers	"Counting the Beat"	3 weeks
23 March	Adam and the Ants	"Antmusic"	5 weeks
30 March	Adam and the Ants	"Antmusic"	5 weeks
6 April	Adam and the Ants	"Antmusic"	5 weeks
13 April	Adam and the Ants	"Antmusic"	5 weeks
20 April	Adam and the Ants	"Antmusic"	5 weeks
27 April	Sheena Easton	"9 to 5 (Morning Train)"	2 weeks
4 May	Sheena Easton	"9 to 5 (Morning Train)"	2 weeks
11 May	Roxy Music	"Jealous Guy"	4 weeks
18 May	Roxy Music	"Jealous Guy"	4 weeks
25 May	Roxy Music	"Jealous Guy"	4 weeks
1 June	Roxy Music	"Jealous Guy"	4 weeks
8 June	Shakin' Stevens	"This Ole House"	1 week
15 June	Kim Carnes	"Bette Davis Eyes"	5 weeks
22 June	Kim Carnes	"Bette Davis Eyes"	5 weeks
29 June	Kim Carnes	"Bette Davis Eyes"	5 weeks
6 July	Kim Carnes	"Bette Davis Eyes"	5 weeks
13 July	Kim Carnes	"Bette Davis Eyes"	5 weeks
20 July	Stars on 45	"Stars on 45 Medley"	4 weeks
27 July	Stars on 45	"Stars on 45 Medley"	4 weeks
3 August	Stars on 45	"Stars on 45 Medley"	4 weeks
10 August	Stars on 45	"Stars on 45 Medley"	4 weeks
17 August	Devo	DEV-O Live (EP)	3 weeks
24 August	Devo	DEV-O Live (EP)	3 weeks
31 August	Rick Springfield	"Jessie's Girl"	1 week
7 September	Devo	DEV-O Live (EP)	3 weeks
14 September	Shakin' Stevens	"You Drive Me Crazy"	3 weeks
21 September	Shakin' Stevens	"You Drive Me Crazy"	3 weeks
28 September	Shakin' Stevens	"You Drive Me Crazy"	3 weeks
5 October	Diana Ross and Lionel Richie	"Endless Love"	4 weeks
12 October	Diana Ross and Lionel Richie	"Endless Love"	4 weeks
19 October	Diana Ross and Lionel Richie	"Endless Love"	4 weeks
26 October	Diana Ross and Lionel Richie	"Endless Love"	4 weeks
2 November	Billy Field	"You Weren't in Love with Me"	1 week
9 November	The Rolling Stones	"Start Me Up"	1 week
16 November	Olivia Newton-John	"Physical"	5 weeks
23 November	Olivia Newton-John	"Physical"	5 weeks
30 November	Olivia Newton-John	"Physical"	5 weeks
7 December	Olivia Newton-John	"Physical"	5 weeks
14 December	Olivia Newton-John	"Physical"	5 weeks
21 December	Men at Work	"Down Under"	6 weeks
28 December	Men at Work	"Down Under"	6 weeks

Other hits
Songs peaking at number two included "Stop the Cavalry" and "Louise (We Get It Right)" by Jona Lewie, "Angel of the Morning" by Juice Newton, "Who Can It Be Now?" by Men at Work, "Every Little Thing She Does Is Magic" by The Police, and "Wired for Sound" by Cliff Richard.

"Turn Me Loose" by Loverboy, "Girls Can Get It" by Dr. Hook, "Keep On Loving You" by REO Speedwagon, "Gotta Pull Myself Together" by The Nolans and "In the Air Tonight" by Phil Collins all peaked at number 3. Other major hits (with their peak positions) were "Jesse" by Carly Simon (4), "Kids in America" by Kim Wilde (5) and "Precious to Me" by Phil Seymour (6).

Hits by Australasian artists included "If I Were a Carpenter" by Swanee, "Bad Habits" by Billy Field, "Boys in Town" by Divinyls and "State of the Heart" by Mondo Rock.

=== 1982 (Kent Music Report) ===
Date	Artist	Single	Weeks at number one
4 January	Men at Work	"Down Under"	6 weeks
11 January	Men at Work	"Down Under"	6 weeks
18 January	Men at Work	"Down Under"	6 weeks
24 January	Men at Work	"Down Under"	6 weeks
1 February	Lindsey Buckingham	"Trouble"	3 weeks
8 February	Lindsey Buckingham	"Trouble"	3 weeks
15 February	Lindsey Buckingham	"Trouble"	3 weeks
22 February	Soft Cell	"Tainted Love"	3 weeks
1 March	Soft Cell	"Tainted Love"	3 weeks
8 March	Soft Cell	"Tainted Love"	3 weeks
15 March	The J. Geils Band	"Centerfold"	1 week
22 March	Moving Pictures	"What About Me"	6 weeks
29 March	Moving Pictures	"What About Me"	6 weeks
5 April	Moving Pictures	"What About Me"	6 weeks
12 April	Moving Pictures	"What About Me"	6 weeks
19 April	Moving Pictures	"What About Me"	6 weeks
26 April	Moving Pictures	"What About Me"	6 weeks
3 May	Joan Jett and the Blackhearts	"I Love Rock 'n' Roll"	5 weeks
10 May	Joan Jett and the Blackhearts	"I Love Rock 'n' Roll"	5 weeks
17 May	Joan Jett and the Blackhearts	"I Love Rock 'n' Roll"	5 weeks
24 May	Joan Jett and the Blackhearts	"I Love Rock 'n' Roll"	5 weeks
31 May	Joan Jett and the Blackhearts	"I Love Rock 'n' Roll"	5 weeks
7 June	Toni Basil	"Mickey"	2 weeks
14 June	Toni Basil	"Mickey"	2 weeks
21 June	Charlene	"I've Never Been to Me"	6 weeks
28 June	Charlene	"I've Never Been to Me"	6 weeks
5 July	Charlene	"I've Never Been to Me"	6 weeks
12 July	Charlene	"I've Never Been to Me"	6 weeks
19 July	Charlene	"I've Never Been to Me"	6 weeks
26 July	Charlene	"I've Never Been to Me"	6 weeks
2 August	A Flock of Seagulls	"I Ran (So Far Away)"	2 weeks
9 August	A Flock of Seagulls	"I Ran (So Far Away)"	2 weeks
16 August	Adam Ant	"Goody Two Shoes"	2 weeks
23 August	Adam Ant	"Goody Two Shoes"	2 weeks
30 August	Ray Parker Jr.	"The Other Woman"	1 week
6 September	Steve Miller Band	"Abracadabra"	2 weeks
13 September	Steve Miller Band	"Abracadabra"	2 weeks
20 September	Survivor	"Eye of the Tiger"	6 weeks
27 September	Survivor	"Eye of the Tiger"	6 weeks
4 October	Survivor	"Eye of the Tiger"	6 weeks
11 October	Survivor	"Eye of the Tiger"	6 weeks
18 October	Survivor	"Eye of the Tiger"	6 weeks
25 October	Survivor	"Eye of the Tiger"	6 weeks
1 November	Dexys Midnight Runners	"Come On Eileen"	5 weeks
8 November	Dexys Midnight Runners	"Come On Eileen"	5 weeks
15 November	Dexys Midnight Runners	"Come On Eileen"	5 weeks
22 November	Dexys Midnight Runners	"Come On Eileen"	5 weeks
29 November	Dexys Midnight Runners	"Come On Eileen"	5 weeks
6 December	Musical Youth	"Pass the Dutchie"	3 weeks
13 December	Musical Youth	"Pass the Dutchie"	3 weeks
20 December	Musical Youth	"Pass the Dutchie"	3 weeks
27 December	Culture Club	"Do You Really Want to Hurt Me"	6 weeks

Other hits
Songs peaking at number two included "Our Lips Are Sealed" by The Go-Go's, "Theme from The Greatest American Hero (Believe It or Not)" by Joey Scarbury, "Ebony and Ivory" by Paul McCartney and Stevie Wonder, "Key Largo" by Bertie Higgins, "Six Months in a Leaky Boat" by Split Enz, "If You Want My Love" by Cheap Trick, and "Shy Boy" by Bananarama.

Other hits (with peak positions shown) included "Waiting for a Girl Like You" (3) by Foreigner, "Young Turks" (3) by Rod Stewart, "Hard to Say I'm Sorry" (4) by Chicago, "You Should Hear How She Talks About You" (4) by Melissa Manchester, "Da Da Da" (4) by Trio, "Poison Arrow" (4) by ABC, "Homosapien" (4) by Pete Shelley, "Hurts So Good" (5) by John "Cougar" Mellencamp, "Hungry Like the Wolf" (5) by Duran Duran and "Cambodia" (7) by Kim Wilde.

Hits by Australasian artists included "Forever Now" by Cold Chisel, "Body and Soul" by Jo Kennedy, "Solid Rock" by Goanna, "Great Southern Land" by Icehouse, "Dirty Creature" by Split Enz, "Down on the Border" by Little River Band and "Lady, What's Your Name" by Swanee.

=== 1983 (Kent Music Report/ARIA Charts) ===
Date	Artist	Single	Weeks at number one
3 January	Culture Club	"Do You Really Want to Hurt Me"	6 weeks
10 January	Culture Club	"Do You Really Want to Hurt Me"	6 weeks
17 January	Culture Club	"Do You Really Want to Hurt Me"	6 weeks
23 January	Culture Club	"Do You Really Want to Hurt Me"	6 weeks
31 January	Culture Club	"Do You Really Want to Hurt Me"	6 weeks
7 February	Laura Branigan	"Gloria"	7 weeks
14 February	Laura Branigan	"Gloria"	7 weeks
21 February	Laura Branigan	"Gloria"	7 weeks
28 February	Laura Branigan	"Gloria"	7 weeks
7 March	Laura Branigan	"Gloria"	7 weeks
14 March	Laura Branigan	"Gloria"	7 weeks
21 March	Laura Branigan	"Gloria"	7 weeks
28 March	Joe Cocker and Jennifer Warnes	"Up Where We Belong"	2 weeks
4 April	Joe Cocker and Jennifer Warnes	"Up Where We Belong"	2 weeks
11 April	Michael Jackson	"Billie Jean"	5 weeks
18 April	Michael Jackson	"Billie Jean"	5 weeks
25 April	Michael Jackson	"Billie Jean"	5 weeks
2 May	Michael Jackson	"Billie Jean"	5 weeks
9 May	Michael Jackson	"Billie Jean"	5 weeks
16 May	Redgum	"I Was Only 19 (A Walk in the Light Green)"	2 weeks
23 May	Redgum	"I Was Only 19 (A Walk in the Light Green)"	2 weeks
30 May	Bonnie Tyler	"Total Eclipse of the Heart"	6 weeks
6 June	Bonnie Tyler	"Total Eclipse of the Heart"	6 weeks
13 June	Bonnie Tyler	"Total Eclipse of the Heart"	6 weeks
20 June	Bonnie Tyler	"Total Eclipse of the Heart"	6 weeks
27 June	Bonnie Tyler	"Total Eclipse of the Heart"	6 weeks
4 July	Bonnie Tyler	"Total Eclipse of the Heart"	6 weeks
11 July	Irene Cara	"Flashdance... What a Feeling"	7 weeks
18 July	Irene Cara	"Flashdance... What a Feeling"	7 weeks
25 July	Irene Cara	"Flashdance... What a Feeling"	7 weeks
1 August	Irene Cara	"Flashdance... What a Feeling"	7 weeks
8 August	Irene Cara	"Flashdance... What a Feeling"	7 weeks
15 August	Austen Tayshus	"Australiana"	8 weeks
22 August	Irene Cara	"Flashdance... What a Feeling"	7 weeks
29 August	Irene Cara	"Flashdance... What a Feeling"	7 weeks
5 September	Austen Tayshus	"Australiana"	8 weeks
12 September	Austen Tayshus	"Australiana"	8 weeks
19 September	Austen Tayshus	"Australiana"	8 weeks
26 September	Austen Tayshus	"Australiana"	8 weeks
3 October	Austen Tayshus	"Australiana"	8 weeks
10 October	Austen Tayshus	"Australiana"	8 weeks
17 October	Austen Tayshus	"Australiana"	8 weeks
24 October	Culture Club	"Karma Chameleon"	5 weeks
31 October	Culture Club	"Karma Chameleon"	5 weeks
7 November	Culture Club	"Karma Chameleon"	5 weeks
14 November	Culture Club	"Karma Chameleon"	5 weeks
21 November	Culture Club	"Karma Chameleon"	5 weeks
28 November	Australian Crawl	"Reckless (Don't Be So)"	1 week
5 December	Billy Joel	"Uptown Girl"	1 week
12 December	Kenny Rogers and Dolly Parton	"Islands in the Stream"	1 week
19 December	Lionel Richie	"All Night Long (All Night)"	6 weeks
26 December	Lionel Richie	"All Night Long (All Night)"	6 weeks

Other hits
Songs peaking at number two included "Heartbreaker" by Dionne Warwick, "Twisting by the Pool" (EP) by Dire Straits, "Let's Dance" by David Bowie, "1999" by Prince, "Beat It" by Michael Jackson, "Every Breath You Take" by The Police, "Electric Avenue" by Eddy Grant, "Maniac" by Michael Sembello, "Rain" by Dragon, "Bop Girl" by Pat Wilson, and "Red Red Wine" by UB40.

Other major hits (with peak positions noted) included "Save Your Love" (3) by Renee and Renato, "Give It Up" (3) by KC and the Sunshine Band, "I'm Still Standing" (3) by Elton John, "You Can't Hurry Love" (3) by Phil Collins, "I.O.U." (3) by Freeez, "I Eat Cannibals" (4) by Toto Coelo, "Young Guns" (4) by Wham!, "The Safety Dance" (5) by Men Without Hats, "Africa" (5) by Toto, and "Drop the Pilot" (6) by Joan Armatrading.

Hits by Australasian artists also included "Send Me an Angel" by Real Life, "Fraction Too Much Friction" by Tim Finn, "Shoop Shoop Diddy Wop Cumma Cumma Wang Dang" by Monte Video and the Cassettes, "Overkill" and "Dr. Heckyll & Mr. Jive" by Men at Work, and "Power and the Passion" by Midnight Oil.

=== 1984 (Kent Music Report/ARIA Charts) ===
Date	Artist	Single	Weeks at number one
2 January	Lionel Richie	"All Night Long (All Night)"	6 weeks
9 January	Lionel Richie	"All Night Long (All Night)"	6 weeks
16 January	Lionel Richie	"All Night Long (All Night)"	6 weeks
23 January	Lionel Richie	"All Night Long (All Night)"	6 weeks
30 January	INXS	"Original Sin"	2 weeks
6 February	INXS	"Original Sin"	2 weeks
13 February	Pat Benatar	"Love Is a Battlefield"	5 weeks
20 February	Pat Benatar	"Love Is a Battlefield"	5 weeks
27 February	Pat Benatar	"Love Is a Battlefield"	5 weeks
5 March	Pat Benatar	"Love Is a Battlefield"	5 weeks
12 March	Pat Benatar	"Love Is a Battlefield"	5 weeks
19 March	Cyndi Lauper	"Girls Just Want to Have Fun"	2 weeks
26 March	Cyndi Lauper	"Girls Just Want to Have Fun"	2 weeks
2 April	Nena	"99 Luftballons"	5 weeks
9 April	Nena	"99 Luftballons"	5 weeks
16 April	Nena	"99 Luftballons"	5 weeks
23 April	Nena	"99 Luftballons"	5 weeks
30 April	Nena	"99 Luftballons"	5 weeks
7 May	"Weird Al" Yankovic	"Eat It"	1 week
14 May	Kenny Loggins	"Footloose"	3 weeks
21 May	Kenny Loggins	"Footloose"	3 weeks
28 May	Kenny Loggins	"Footloose"	3 weeks
4 June	Lionel Richie	"Hello"	3 weeks
11 June	Lionel Richie	"Hello"	3 weeks
18 June	Lionel Richie	"Hello"	3 weeks
25 June	The Twelfth Man	"It's Just Not Cricket"	3 weeks
2 July	The Twelfth Man	"It's Just Not Cricket"	3 weeks
9 July	The Twelfth Man	"It's Just Not Cricket"	3 weeks
16 July	Wham!	"Wake Me Up Before You Go-Go"	7 weeks
23 July	Wham!	"Wake Me Up Before You Go-Go"	7 weeks
30 July	Wham!	"Wake Me Up Before You Go-Go"	7 weeks
6 August	Wham!	"Wake Me Up Before You Go-Go"	7 weeks
13 August	Wham!	"Wake Me Up Before You Go-Go"	7 weeks
20 August	Prince	"When Doves Cry"	1 week
27 August	Wham!	"Wake Me Up Before You Go-Go"	7 weeks
3 September	Wham!	"Wake Me Up Before You Go-Go"	7 weeks
10 September	Tina Turner	"What's Love Got to Do with It"	1 week
17 September	George Michael	"Careless Whisper"	4 weeks
24 September	George Michael	"Careless Whisper"	4 weeks
1 October	George Michael	"Careless Whisper"	4 weeks
8 October	George Michael	"Careless Whisper"	4 weeks
15 October	Stevie Wonder	"I Just Called to Say I Love You"	8 weeks
22 October	Stevie Wonder	"I Just Called to Say I Love You"	8 weeks
29 October	Stevie Wonder	"I Just Called to Say I Love You"	8 weeks
5 November	Stevie Wonder	"I Just Called to Say I Love You"	8 weeks
12 November	Stevie Wonder	"I Just Called to Say I Love You"	8 weeks
19 November	Stevie Wonder	"I Just Called to Say I Love You"	8 weeks
26 November	Stevie Wonder	"I Just Called to Say I Love You"	8 weeks
3 December	Stevie Wonder	"I Just Called to Say I Love You"	8 weeks
10 December	Madonna	"Like a Virgin"	5 weeks
17 December	Madonna	"Like a Virgin"	5 weeks
24 December	Madonna	"Like a Virgin"	5 weeks
31 December	Madonna	"Like a Virgin"	5 weeks

Other hits
The year's best charting single was Bruce Springsteen's "Dancing in the Dark". Despite having only reached number 5 on the singles chart, it remained on the charts for 40 weeks.

Songs peaking at number two included "Come Said the Boy" by Mondo Rock, "Radio Ga Ga" by Queen, "Jump" by Van Halen, "Heaven (Must Be There)" by Eurogliders, "Ghostbusters" by Ray Parker Jr., "The War Song" by Culture Club, and "Caribbean Queen (No More Love on the Run)" by Billy Ocean.

Other major hits (with peak position noted) included "Calling Your Name" (3) by Marilyn, "Against All Odds (Take a Look at Me Now)" (3) by Phil Collins, "I Can Dream About You" (3) by Dan Hartman, "Hold Me Now" (3) by Thompson Twins, "Thriller" (4) by Michael Jackson, "Pride (In the Name of Love)" (4) by U2, "Sad Songs (Say So Much)" (4) by Elton John, and "Relax" (5) and "Two Tribes" (4) by Frankie Goes to Hollywood.

Hits by Australasian artists also included "Listening" and "A Beat for You" both by Pseudo Echo, "I Send a Message" and "Burn for You" by INXS, "Twist of Fate" by Olivia Newton-John, "Soul Kind of Feeling" by Dynamic Hepnotics and "Catch Me I'm Falling" by Real Life.

=== 1985 (Kent Music Report/ARIA Charts) ===
Date	Artist	Single	Weeks at number one
7 January	Madonna	"Like a Virgin"	5 weeks
14 January	Band Aid	"Do They Know It's Christmas?"	4 weeks
21 January	Band Aid	"Do They Know It's Christmas?"	4 weeks
28 January	Band Aid	"Do They Know It's Christmas?"	4 weeks
4 February	Band Aid	"Do They Know It's Christmas?"	4 weeks
11 February	Foreigner	"I Want to Know What Love Is"	5 weeks
18 February	Foreigner	"I Want to Know What Love Is"	5 weeks
25 February	Foreigner	"I Want to Know What Love Is"	5 weeks
4 March	Foreigner	"I Want to Know What Love Is"	5 weeks
11 March	Foreigner	"I Want to Know What Love Is"	5 weeks
18 March	Murray Head	"One Night in Bangkok"	1 week
25 March	Tears for Fears	"Shout"	1 week
1 April	Jim Diamond	"I Should Have Known Better"	1 week
8 April	USA for Africa	"We Are the World"	9 weeks
15 April	USA for Africa	"We Are the World"	9 weeks
22 April	USA for Africa	"We Are the World"	9 weeks
29 April	USA for Africa	"We Are the World"	9 weeks
6 May	USA for Africa	"We Are the World"	9 weeks
13 May	USA for Africa	"We Are the World"	9 weeks
20 May	USA for Africa	"We Are the World"	9 weeks
27 May	USA for Africa	"We Are the World"	9 weeks
3 June	USA for Africa	"We Are the World"	9 weeks
10 June	Eurythmics	"Would I Lie to You?"	2 weeks
17 June	Eurythmics	"Would I Lie to You?"	2 weeks
24 June	Madonna	"Angel" / "Into the Groove"	4 weeks
1 July	Madonna	"Angel" / "Into the Groove"	4 weeks
8 July	Madonna	"Angel" / "Into the Groove"	4 weeks
15 July	Madonna	"Angel" / "Into the Groove"	4 weeks
22 July	Madonna	"Crazy for You"	4 weeks
29 July	Madonna	"Crazy for You"	4 weeks
5 August	Madonna	"Crazy for You"	4 weeks
12 August	Madonna	"Crazy for You"	4 weeks
19 August	Tina Turner	"We Don't Need Another Hero (Thunderdome)"	3 weeks
26 August	Tina Turner	"We Don't Need Another Hero (Thunderdome)"	3 weeks
2 September	Tina Turner	"We Don't Need Another Hero (Thunderdome)"	3 weeks
9 September	Models	"Out of Mind, Out of Sight"	2 weeks
16 September	Models	"Out of Mind, Out of Sight"	2 weeks
23 September	Huey Lewis and the News	"The Power of Love"	2 weeks
30 September	Huey Lewis and the News	"The Power of Love"	2 weeks
7 October	Mick Jagger and David Bowie	"Dancing in the Street"	2 weeks
14 October	Mick Jagger and David Bowie	"Dancing in the Street"	2 weeks
21 October	UB40 with Chrissie Hynde	"I Got You Babe"	3 weeks
28 October	UB40 with Chrissie Hynde	"I Got You Babe"	3 weeks
4 November	UB40 with Chrissie Hynde	"I Got You Babe"	3 weeks
11 November	a-ha	"Take On Me"	2 weeks
18 November	a-ha	"Take On Me"	2 weeks
25 November	Jennifer Rush	"The Power of Love"	2 weeks
2 December	Midnight Oil	Species Deceases (EP)	6 weeks
9 December	Jennifer Rush	"The Power of Love"	2 weeks
16 December	Midnight Oil	Species Deceases (EP)	6 weeks
23 December	Midnight Oil	Species Deceases (EP)	6 weeks
30 December	Midnight Oil	Species Deceases (EP)	6 weeks

Other hits
Songs peaking at number two included "Born in the U.S.A." by Bruce Springsteen, "Ti Amo" by Laura Branigan, "Barbados" by Models, "The Heat Is On" by Glenn Frey, "One More Night" by Phil Collins, "Everybody Wants to Rule the World" by Tears for Fears, "Can't Fight This Feeling" by REO Speedwagon, "Live It Up" by Mental As Anything, and "What You Need" by INXS.

Other major hits (with peak positions noted) included "You Spin Me Round (Like a Record)" (3) by Dead or Alive, "Part-Time Lover" (3) by Stevie Wonder, "Last Christmas" (3) by Wham!, "Money for Nothing" (4) by Dire Straits, "Neutron Dance" (4) by Pointer Sisters, and "Walking on Sunshine" (4) by Katrina and the Waves.

Hits by Australasian artists also included "I'd Die to Be with You Tonight" by Jimmy Barnes, "50 Years" by Uncanny X-Men, "Too Young for Promises" by Koo De Tah, "Man Overboard" by Do-Ré-Mi, "Don't Go" by Pseudo Echo, "We Will Together" by Eurogliders, and "Pleasure and Pain" by Divinyls.

=== 1986 (Kent Music Report/ARIA Charts) ===
Date	Artist	Single	Weeks at number one
6 January	Midnight Oil	Species Deceases (EP)	6 weeks
13 January	Midnight Oil	Species Deceases (EP)	6 weeks
20 January	Starship	"We Built This City"	4 weeks
27 January	Starship	"We Built This City"	4 weeks
3 February	Starship	"We Built This City"	4 weeks
10 February	Starship	"We Built This City"	4 weeks
17 February	Feargal Sharkey	"A Good Heart"	2 weeks
24 February	Feargal Sharkey	"A Good Heart"	2 weeks
3 March	Dionne Warwick with Gladys Knight, Elton John & Stevie Wonder	"That's What Friends Are For"	1 week
10 March	Billy Ocean	"When the Going Gets Tough, the Tough Get Going"	6 weeks
17 March	Billy Ocean	"When the Going Gets Tough, the Tough Get Going"	6 weeks
24 March	Billy Ocean	"When the Going Gets Tough, the Tough Get Going"	6 weeks
31 March	Billy Ocean	"When the Going Gets Tough, the Tough Get Going"	6 weeks
7 April	Billy Ocean	"When the Going Gets Tough, the Tough Get Going"	6 weeks
14 April	Billy Ocean	"When the Going Gets Tough, the Tough Get Going"	6 weeks
21 April	Diana Ross	"Chain Reaction"	3 weeks
28 April	Diana Ross	"Chain Reaction"	3 weeks
5 May	Diana Ross	"Chain Reaction"	3 weeks
12 May	Cliff Richard and The Young Ones	"Living Doll"	6 weeks
19 May	Cliff Richard and The Young Ones	"Living Doll"	6 weeks
26 May	Cliff Richard and The Young Ones	"Living Doll"	6 weeks
2 June	Cliff Richard and The Young Ones	"Living Doll"	6 weeks
9 June	Cliff Richard and The Young Ones	"Living Doll"	6 weeks
16 June	Cliff Richard and The Young Ones	"Living Doll"	6 weeks
23 June	Robert Palmer	"Addicted to Love"	2 weeks
30 June	Robert Palmer	"Addicted to Love"	2 weeks
7 July	Samantha Fox	"Touch Me (I Want Your Body)"	3 weeks
14 July	Whitney Houston	"Greatest Love of All"	1 week
21 July	Samantha Fox	"Touch Me (I Want Your Body)"	3 weeks
28 July	Samantha Fox	"Touch Me (I Want Your Body)"	3 weeks
4 August	Madonna	"Papa Don't Preach"	6 weeks
11 August	Madonna	"Papa Don't Preach"	6 weeks
18 August	Madonna	"Papa Don't Preach"	6 weeks
25 August	Madonna	"Papa Don't Preach"	6 weeks
1 September	Madonna	"Papa Don't Preach"	6 weeks
8 September	Madonna	"Papa Don't Preach"	6 weeks
15 September	Bananarama	"Venus"	7 weeks
22 September	Bananarama	"Venus"	7 weeks
29 September	Bananarama	"Venus"	7 weeks
6 October	Bananarama	"Venus"	7 weeks
13 October	Bananarama	"Venus"	7 weeks
20 October	Bananarama	"Venus"	7 weeks
27 October	Bananarama	"Venus"	7 weeks
3 November	John Farnham	"You're the Voice"	7 weeks
10 November	John Farnham	"You're the Voice"	7 weeks
17 November	John Farnham	"You're the Voice"	7 weeks
24 November	John Farnham	"You're the Voice"	7 weeks
1 December	John Farnham	"You're the Voice"	7 weeks
8 December	John Farnham	"You're the Voice"	7 weeks
15 December	John Farnham	"You're the Voice"	7 weeks
22 December	Pseudo Echo	"Funkytown"	7 weeks
29 December	Pseudo Echo	"Funkytown"	7 weeks

Other hits
Songs peaking at number two included "Concrete and Clay" by Martin Plaza, "How Will I Know" by Whitney Houston, "Kiss" by Prince and The Revolution, "Stimulation" by Wa Wa Nee, "The Edge of Heaven" by Wham!, "Dancing on the Ceiling" by Lionel Richie, "Take My Breath Away" by Berlin, "Stuck with You" by Huey Lewis and the News, "You Can Call Me Al" by Paul Simon, "Don't Leave Me This Way" by The Communards, and "The Lady in Red" by Chris de Burgh.

Other major hits included "Manic Monday" (3) by The Bangles, "A Matter of Trust" (3) by Billy Joel, "True Colors" (3) by Cyndi Lauper, "Hit That Perfect Beat" (3) by Bronski Beat, "I'm Your Man" (3) by Wham!, "Invisible Touch" (3) by Genesis, "I Wanna Be a Cowboy" (4) by Boys Don't Cry, and "West End Girls" (5) by Pet Shop Boys.

Hits by Australasian artists also included "The Dead Heart" by Midnight Oil, "Who Made Who" by AC/DC, "Great Wall" by Boom Crash Opera, "I Could Make You Love Me" by Wa Wa Nee, "Love an Adventure" by Pseudo Echo, and "Do You Wanna Be?" by I'm Talking.

=== 1987 (Australian Music Report/ARIA Charts) ===
Date	Artist	Single	Weeks at number one
5 January	Pseudo Echo	"Funkytown"	7 weeks
12 January	Pseudo Echo	"Funkytown"	7 weeks
19 January	Pseudo Echo	"Funkytown"	7 weeks
26 January	Pseudo Echo	"Funkytown"	7 weeks
2 February	Pseudo Echo	"Funkytown"	7 weeks
9 February	The Bangles	"Walk Like an Egyptian"	2 weeks
16 February	Kim Wilde	"You Keep Me Hangin' On"	2 weeks
23 February	The Bangles	"Walk Like an Egyptian"	2 weeks
2 March	Kim Wilde	"You Keep Me Hangin' On"	2 weeks
9 March	Boris Gardiner	"I Wanna Wake Up with You"	1 week
16 March	George Michael and Aretha Franklin	"I Knew You Were Waiting (For Me)"	4 weeks
23 March	George Michael and Aretha Franklin	"I Knew You Were Waiting (For Me)"	4 weeks
30 March	George Michael and Aretha Franklin	"I Knew You Were Waiting (For Me)"	4 weeks
6 April	George Michael and Aretha Franklin	"I Knew You Were Waiting (For Me)"	4 weeks
13 April	Paul Lekakis	"Boom Boom (Let's Go Back to My Room)"	5 weeks
20 April	Paul Lekakis	"Boom Boom (Let's Go Back to My Room)"	5 weeks
27 April	Paul Lekakis	"Boom Boom (Let's Go Back to My Room)"	5 weeks
4 May	Paul Lekakis	"Boom Boom (Let's Go Back to My Room)"	5 weeks
11 May	Paul Lekakis	"Boom Boom (Let's Go Back to My Room)"	5 weeks
18 May	Dave Dobbyn with Herbs	"Slice of Heaven"	4 weeks
25 May	Dave Dobbyn with Herbs	"Slice of Heaven"	4 weeks
1 June	Dave Dobbyn with Herbs	"Slice of Heaven"	4 weeks
8 June	Dave Dobbyn with Herbs	"Slice of Heaven"	4 weeks
15 June	Whitney Houston	"I Wanna Dance with Somebody (Who Loves Me)"	5 weeks
22 June	Whitney Houston	"I Wanna Dance with Somebody (Who Loves Me)"	5 weeks
29 June	Whitney Houston	"I Wanna Dance with Somebody (Who Loves Me)"	5 weeks
6 July	Whitney Houston	"I Wanna Dance with Somebody (Who Loves Me)"	5 weeks
13 July	Whitney Houston	"I Wanna Dance with Somebody (Who Loves Me)"	5 weeks
20 July	Mel and Kim	"Respectable"	1 week
27 July	The Party Boys	"He's Gonna Step on You Again"	2 weeks
3 August	The Party Boys	"He's Gonna Step on You Again"	2 weeks
10 August	Kylie Minogue	"Locomotion"	7 weeks
17 August	Kylie Minogue	"Locomotion"	7 weeks
24 August	Kylie Minogue	"Locomotion"	7 weeks
31 August	Kylie Minogue	"Locomotion"	7 weeks
7 September	Kylie Minogue	"Locomotion"	7 weeks
14 September	Kylie Minogue	"Locomotion"	7 weeks
21 September	Kylie Minogue	"Locomotion"	7 weeks
28 September	Los Lobos	"La Bamba"	7 weeks
5 October	Los Lobos	"La Bamba"	7 weeks
12 October	Los Lobos	"La Bamba"	7 weeks
19 October	Los Lobos	"La Bamba"	7 weeks
26 October	Los Lobos	"La Bamba"	7 weeks
2 November	Los Lobos	"La Bamba"	7 weeks
9 November	Los Lobos	"La Bamba"	7 weeks
16 November	Icehouse	"Electric Blue"	1 week
23 November	Jimmy Barnes	"Too Much Ain't Enough Love"	1 week
30 November	Rick Astley	"Never Gonna Give You Up"	7 weeks
7 December	Rick Astley	"Never Gonna Give You Up"	7 weeks
14 December	Rick Astley	"Never Gonna Give You Up"	7 weeks
21 December	Rick Astley	"Never Gonna Give You Up"	7 weeks
28 December	Rick Astley	"Never Gonna Give You Up"	7 weeks

Other hits
Songs peaking at number two included "Good Times" by Jimmy Barnes and INXS, "The Final Countdown" by Europe, "I Want Your Sex" by George Michael, and "Suddenly" by Angry Anderson.

Other major hits (with peak positions noted) included "Old Time Rock and Roll" (3) by Bob Seger and the Silver Bullet Band, "Nothing's Gonna Stop Us Now" (3) by Starship, "Livin' on a Prayer" (3) by Bon Jovi, "Star Trekkin'" (3) by The Firm, "Bad" (4) by Michael Jackson, "What's My Scene?" (3) by Hoodoo Gurus, "Pressure Down" (4) by John Farnham, "Crazy" (4) by Icehouse and "Beds Are Burning" (6) by Midnight Oil.

=== 1988 (Australian Music Report/ARIA Charts) ===
Date	Artist	Single	Weeks at number one
4 January	Rick Astley	"Never Gonna Give You Up"	7 weeks
11 January	Rick Astley	"Never Gonna Give You Up"	7 weeks
18 January	George Michael	"Faith"	1 week
25 January	George Harrison	"Got My Mind Set on You"	1 week
1 February	Bill Medley and Jennifer Warnes	"(I've Had) The Time of My Life"	6 weeks
8 February	Bill Medley and Jennifer Warnes	"(I've Had) The Time of My Life"	6 weeks
15 February	Bill Medley and Jennifer Warnes	"(I've Had) The Time of My Life"	6 weeks
22 February	Bill Medley and Jennifer Warnes	"(I've Had) The Time of My Life"	6 weeks
29 February	Bill Medley and Jennifer Warnes	"(I've Had) The Time of My Life"	6 weeks
7 March	Bill Medley and Jennifer Warnes	"(I've Had) The Time of My Life"	6 weeks
14 March	Kylie Minogue	"I Should Be So Lucky"	6 weeks
21 March	Kylie Minogue	"I Should Be So Lucky"	6 weeks
28 March	Kylie Minogue	"I Should Be So Lucky"	6 weeks
4 April	Kylie Minogue	"I Should Be So Lucky"	6 weeks
11 April	Kylie Minogue	"I Should Be So Lucky"	6 weeks
18 April	Kylie Minogue	"I Should Be So Lucky"	6 weeks
25 April	Billy Ocean	"Get Outta My Dreams, Get into My Car"	5 weeks
2 May	Billy Ocean	"Get Outta My Dreams, Get into My Car"	5 weeks
9 May	Billy Ocean	"Get Outta My Dreams, Get into My Car"	5 weeks
16 May	Billy Ocean	"Get Outta My Dreams, Get into My Car"	5 weeks
23 May	Billy Ocean	"Get Outta My Dreams, Get into My Car"	5 weeks
30 May	Cheap Trick	"The Flame"	3 weeks
6 June	Cheap Trick	"The Flame"	3 weeks
13 June	Cheap Trick	"The Flame"	3 weeks
20 June	Louis Armstrong	"What a Wonderful World"	2 weeks
27 June	Louis Armstrong	"What a Wonderful World"	2 weeks
4 July	Kylie Minogue	"Got to Be Certain"	4 weeks
11 July	Kylie Minogue	"Got to Be Certain"	4 weeks
18 July	Kylie Minogue	"Got to Be Certain"	4 weeks
25 July	Kylie Minogue	"Got to Be Certain"	4 weeks
1 August	John Farnham	"Age of Reason"	3 weeks
8 August	John Farnham	"Age of Reason"	3 weeks
15 August	John Farnham	"Age of Reason"	3 weeks
22 August	Fairground Attraction	"Perfect"	4 weeks
29 August	Fairground Attraction	"Perfect"	4 weeks
5 September	Fairground Attraction	"Perfect"	4 weeks
12 September	Fairground Attraction	"Perfect"	4 weeks
19 September	Robert Palmer	"Simply Irresistible"	5 weeks
26 September	Robert Palmer	"Simply Irresistible"	5 weeks
3 October	Robert Palmer	"Simply Irresistible"	5 weeks
10 October	Robert Palmer	"Simply Irresistible"	5 weeks
17 October	Robert Palmer	"Simply Irresistible"	5 weeks
24 October	U2	"Desire"	2 weeks
31 October	U2	"Desire"	2 weeks
7 November	Phil Collins	"A Groovy Kind of Love"	1 week
14 November	Bobby McFerrin	"Don't Worry, Be Happy"	6 weeks
21 November	Bobby McFerrin	"Don't Worry, Be Happy"	6 weeks
28 November	Bobby McFerrin	"Don't Worry, Be Happy"	6 weeks
5 December	Bobby McFerrin	"Don't Worry, Be Happy"	6 weeks
12 December	Bobby McFerrin	"Don't Worry, Be Happy"	6 weeks
19 December	Bobby McFerrin	"Don't Worry, Be Happy"	6 weeks
26 December	The Beach Boys	"Kokomo"	7 weeks

Other hits
Songs peaking at number two included "Heaven Is a Place on Earth" by Belinda Carlisle, "Stutter Rap (No Sleep Til Bedtime)" by Morris Minor and the Majors, "Better Be Home Soon" by Crowded House, "Doctorin' the Tardis" by The Timelords, The Only Way Is Up by Yazz, and "If I Could" by 1927.

=== 1989 (Australian Music Report) ===
Date	Artist	Single	Weeks at number one
2 January	The Beach Boys	"Kokomo"	7 weeks
9 January	The Beach Boys	"Kokomo"	7 weeks
16 January	The Beach Boys	"Kokomo"	7 weeks
23 January	The Beach Boys	"Kokomo"	7 weeks
30 January	The Beach Boys	"Kokomo"	7 weeks
6 February	The Beach Boys	"Kokomo"	7 weeks
13 February	Womack & Womack	"Teardrops"	1 week
20 February	The Proclaimers	"I'm Gonna Be (500 Miles)"	4 weeks
27 February	The Proclaimers	"I'm Gonna Be (500 Miles)"	4 weeks
6 March	The Proclaimers	"I'm Gonna Be (500 Miles)"	4 weeks
13 March	The Proclaimers	"I'm Gonna Be (500 Miles)"	4 weeks
20 March	Ian Moss	"Tucker's Daughter"	1 week
27 March	Fine Young Cannibals	"She Drives Me Crazy"	5 weeks
3 April	Fine Young Cannibals	"She Drives Me Crazy"	5 weeks
10 April	Fine Young Cannibals	"She Drives Me Crazy"	5 weeks
17 April	Madonna	"Like a Prayer"	4 weeks
24 April	Fine Young Cannibals	"She Drives Me Crazy"	5 weeks
1 May	Fine Young Cannibals	"She Drives Me Crazy"	5 weeks
8 May	Mike + The Mechanics	"The Living Years"	1 week
15 May	Madonna	"Like a Prayer"	4 weeks
22 May	Madonna	"Like a Prayer"	4 weeks
29 May	Madonna	"Like a Prayer"	4 weeks
5 June	Julian Lennon	"Now You're in Heaven"	1 week
12 June	The Bangles	"Eternal Flame"	1 week
19 June	Bette Midler	"Wind Beneath My Wings"	3 weeks
26 June	Bette Midler	"Wind Beneath My Wings"	3 weeks
3 July	Bette Midler	"Wind Beneath My Wings"	3 weeks
10 July	Roxette	"The Look"	5 weeks
17 July	Roxette	"The Look"	5 weeks
24 July	Roxette	"The Look"	5 weeks
31 July	Roxette	"The Look"	5 weeks
7 August	Roxette	"The Look"	5 weeks
14 August	New Kids on the Block	"You Got It (The Right Stuff)"	1 week
21 August	Simply Red	"If You Don't Know Me by Now"	3 weeks
28 August	Simply Red	"If You Don't Know Me by Now"	3 weeks
4 September	Simply Red	"If You Don't Know Me by Now"	3 weeks
11 September	Richard Marx	"Right Here Waiting"	6 weeks
18 September	Richard Marx	"Right Here Waiting"	6 weeks
25 September	Richard Marx	"Right Here Waiting"	6 weeks
2 October	Richard Marx	"Right Here Waiting"	6 weeks
9 October	Richard Marx	"Right Here Waiting"	6 weeks
16 October	Richard Marx	"Right Here Waiting"	6 weeks
23 October	Jive Bunny and the Mastermixers	"Swing the Mood"	3 weeks
30 October	Jive Bunny and the Mastermixers	"Swing the Mood"	3 weeks
6 November	Jive Bunny and the Mastermixers	"Swing the Mood"	3 weeks
13 November	Cher	"If I Could Turn Back Time"	6 weeks
20 November	Cher	"If I Could Turn Back Time"	6 weeks
27 November	Cher	"If I Could Turn Back Time"	6 weeks
4 December	Cher	"If I Could Turn Back Time"	6 weeks
11 December	Cher	"If I Could Turn Back Time"	6 weeks
18 December	Cher	"If I Could Turn Back Time"	6 weeks
25 December	The B-52's	"Love Shack"	8 weeks (7 weeks in 1990)

Other hits
Songs peaking at number two included "Especially for You" by Kylie Minogue and Jason Donovan, "Bedroom Eyes" by Kate Ceberano, "Batdance" by Prince, "I'll Be Loving You (Forever)" by New Kids on the Block, and "All I Want Is You" by U2.

== ARIA Charts ==
ARIA licensed the top 50 portion of the Kent Music Report (re-branded the Australian Music Report in 1987) chart between June 1983 and early June 1988. ARIA conducted its own chart survey, for the first time, on 6 June 1988, producing a top 50 chart as a test-run. The following week's survey, 13 June 1988, became the first ARIA-produced chart published, although it was dated week-ending 26 June 1988 on the printed top 50 chart available in record stores, in keeping with the Australian Music Report's method of dating their charts. The ARIA-produced chart ran concurrently with the Australian Music Report, until the latter ceased publication in 1999. The dates given for ARIA Charts below are Mondays, reflecting the date the chart survey was conducted.

Key
The yellow background indicates the #1 song on the ARIA End of Year Chart

=== 1988 (ARIA Charts) ===
Date	Artist	Single	Weeks at number one
13 June	Cheap Trick	"The Flame"	1 week
20 June	Louis Armstrong	"What a Wonderful World"	1 week
27 June	Kylie Minogue	"Got to Be Certain"	3 weeks
4 July	Kylie Minogue	"Got to Be Certain"	3 weeks
11 July	Kylie Minogue	"Got to Be Certain"	3 weeks
18 July	John Farnham	"Age of Reason"	4 weeks
25 July	John Farnham	"Age of Reason"	4 weeks
1 August	John Farnham	"Age of Reason"	4 weeks
8 August	John Farnham	"Age of Reason"	4 weeks
15 August	Fairground Attraction	"Perfect"	3 weeks
22 August	Fairground Attraction	"Perfect"	3 weeks
29 August	Fairground Attraction	"Perfect"	3 weeks
5 September	Robert Palmer	"Simply Irresistible"	5 weeks
12 September	Robert Palmer	"Simply Irresistible"	5 weeks
19 September	Robert Palmer	"Simply Irresistible"	5 weeks
26 September	Robert Palmer	"Simply Irresistible"	5 weeks
3 October	Robert Palmer	"Simply Irresistible"	5 weeks
10 October	U2	"Desire"	3 weeks
17 October	U2	"Desire"	3 weeks
24 October	U2	"Desire"	3 weeks
31 October	Bobby McFerrin	"Don't Worry, Be Happy"	7 weeks
7 November	Bobby McFerrin	"Don't Worry, Be Happy"	7 weeks
14 November	Bobby McFerrin	"Don't Worry, Be Happy"	7 weeks
21 November	Bobby McFerrin	"Don't Worry, Be Happy"	7 weeks
28 November	Bobby McFerrin	"Don't Worry, Be Happy"	7 weeks
5 December	Bobby McFerrin	"Don't Worry, Be Happy"	7 weeks
12 December	Bobby McFerrin	"Don't Worry, Be Happy"	7 weeks
19 December	The Beach Boys	"Kokomo"	8 weeks
26 December	The Beach Boys	"Kokomo"	8 weeks

Other hits
Bill Medley and Jennifer Warnes' hit "(I've Had) The Time of My Life" was the best-charting single of the year according to ARIA (whereas the Australian Music Report lists this as the 2nd best-charting single of the year.)

Songs peaking at number two songs included "Better Be Home Soon" by Crowded House, "Doctorin' the Tardis" by The Timelords, "All Fired Up" by Pat Benatar, "The Only Way Is Up" by Yazz and the Plastic Population, and "A Groovy Kind of Love" by Phil Collins.

Other major hits (with peak positions noted) included "Don't Be Cruel" (4) by Cheap Trick, "Love in the First Degree" (5) and "I Want You Back" (3) by Bananarama, "When Will I Be Famous?" (10) and "I Owe You Nothing" (6) by Bros, "I Want Your Love" (7) by Transvision Vamp and "Fat" (12) by "Weird Al Yankovic".

Hits by Australasian artists (with peak positions noted) also included "When a Man Loves a Woman" (3) by Jimmy Barnes, "Nothing Can Divide Us" (3) by Jason Donovan, "That's When I Think of You" (6) and "If I Could" (4) by 1927, "Love Is a Bridge" (11) by Little River Band, "So Excellent"/"I Go, I Go" (8) by Kylie Mole, and "I Still Love You (Je Ne Sais Pas Pourquoi)" (11) by Kylie Minogue.

=== 1989 (ARIA Charts) ===
Date	Artist	Single	Weeks at number one
2 January	The Beach Boys	"Kokomo"	8 weeks
9 January	The Beach Boys	"Kokomo"	8 weeks
16 January	The Beach Boys	"Kokomo"	8 weeks
23 January	The Beach Boys	"Kokomo"	8 weeks
30 January	The Beach Boys	"Kokomo"	8 weeks
6 February	The Beach Boys	"Kokomo"	8 weeks
13 February	The Proclaimers	"I'm Gonna Be (500 Miles)"	5 weeks
20 February	The Proclaimers	"I'm Gonna Be (500 Miles)"	5 weeks
27 February	The Proclaimers	"I'm Gonna Be (500 Miles)"	5 weeks
6 March	The Proclaimers	"I'm Gonna Be (500 Miles)"	5 weeks
13 March	The Proclaimers	"I'm Gonna Be (500 Miles)"	5 weeks
20 March	Madonna	"Like a Prayer"	5 weeks
27 March	Fine Young Cannibals	"She Drives Me Crazy"	3 weeks
3 April	Fine Young Cannibals	"She Drives Me Crazy"	3 weeks
10 April	Madonna	"Like a Prayer"	5 weeks
17 April	Fine Young Cannibals	"She Drives Me Crazy"	3 weeks
24 April	Madonna	"Like a Prayer"	5 weeks
1 May	Madonna	"Like a Prayer"	5 weeks
8 May	Mike + The Mechanics	"The Living Years"	1 week
15 May	Madonna	"Like a Prayer"	5 weeks
22 May	The Bangles	"Eternal Flame"	3 weeks
29 May	Bette Midler	"Wind Beneath My Wings"	2 weeks
5 June	The Bangles	"Eternal Flame"	3 weeks
12 June	Bette Midler	"Wind Beneath My Wings"	2 weeks
19 June	The Bangles	"Eternal Flame"	3 weeks
26 June	Roxette	"The Look"	6 weeks
3 July	Roxette	"The Look"	6 weeks
10 July	Roxette	"The Look"	6 weeks
17 July	Roxette	"The Look"	6 weeks
24 July	Roxette	"The Look"	6 weeks
31 July	Roxette	"The Look"	6 weeks
7 August	New Kids on the Block	"You Got It (The Right Stuff)"	3 weeks
14 August	New Kids on the Block	"You Got It (The Right Stuff)"	3 weeks
21 August	New Kids on the Block	"You Got It (The Right Stuff)"	3 weeks
28 August	Simply Red	"If You Don't Know Me by Now"	1 week
4 September	Richard Marx	"Right Here Waiting"	5 weeks
11 September	Richard Marx	"Right Here Waiting"	5 weeks
18 September	Richard Marx	"Right Here Waiting"	5 weeks
25 September	Richard Marx	"Right Here Waiting"	5 weeks
2 October	Richard Marx	"Right Here Waiting"	5 weeks
9 October	Cher	"If I Could Turn Back Time"	7 weeks
16 October	Jive Bunny and the Mastermixers	"Swing the Mood"	3 weeks
23 October	Jive Bunny and the Mastermixers	"Swing the Mood"	3 weeks
30 October	Jive Bunny and the Mastermixers	"Swing the Mood"	3 weeks
6 November	Cher	"If I Could Turn Back Time"	7 weeks
13 November	Cher	"If I Could Turn Back Time"	7 weeks
20 November	Cher	"If I Could Turn Back Time"	7 weeks
27 November	Cher	"If I Could Turn Back Time"	7 weeks
4 December	Cher	"If I Could Turn Back Time"	7 weeks
11 December	Cher	"If I Could Turn Back Time"	7 weeks
18 December	The B-52's	"Love Shack"	8 weeks
25 December	The B-52's	"Love Shack"	8 weeks

Other hits
The biggest chart hit, Madonna's "Like a Prayer", was ranked the 2nd best-charting single of the year by the Australian Music Report.

Songs peaking at number two included "Especially for You" by Kylie Minogue and Jason Donovan, "Teardrops" by Womack & Womack, "Tucker's Daughter" by Ian Moss, "Bedroom Eyes" by Kate Ceberano, "Batdance" by Prince, "All I Want Is You" by U2, and "We Didn't Start the Fire" by Billy Joel.

Other major hits (with peak positions noted) included "Baby I Don't Care" (3) by Transvision Vamp, "Poison" (3) by Alice Cooper, "Stop!" (4) by Sam Brown, "Talk It Over" (4) by Grayson Hugh, "Dressed for Success" (3) by Roxette, "You Got It" (3) by Roy Orbison, "The Best" (4) by Tina Turner, and "I Don't Want a Lover" (4) by Texas.

Hits by Australasian artists also included "Ring My Bell" (5) by Collette, "She Has to Be Loved" (5) by Jenny Morris, "Rock and Roll Music" (5) by Mental As Anything, "One Summer" (8) by Daryl Braithwaite, "Say Goodbye" (6) by Indecent Obsession, "Chained to the Wheel" (9) by The Black Sorrows, and "Hand on Your Heart" (4), "Wouldn't Change a Thing" (6), "Never Too Late" (14) all by Kylie Minogue.

== See also ==
- Music of Australia
- List of UK Singles Chart number ones of the 1980s
- List of Billboard number-one singles
