= List of top 25 singles for 1980 in Australia =

Top 25 singles of 1980 < 1979 1981 >

Other Australian top charts for 1980
- top 25 albums

Australian top 40 charts for the 1980s
- singles
- albums

Australian number-one charts of 1980
- albums
- singles

The following lists the top 25 (end of year) charting singles on the Australian Singles Charts, for the year of 1980. These were the best charting singles in Australia for 1980. The source for this year is the "Kent Music Report".

#	Title	Artist	Highest pos. reached	Weeks at No. 1
1.	"I Got You"	Split Enz	1	8
2.	"Turning Japanese"	The Vapors	1	2
3.	"Crazy Little Thing Called Love"	Queen	1	7
4.	"Another Brick in the Wall part 2"	Pink Floyd	2	
5.	"Brass in Pocket"	The Pretenders	2	
6.	"Can't Stop the Music"	Village People	1	4
7.	"Space Invaders"	Player One	3	
8.	"More Than I Can Say"	Leo Sayer	1	2
9.	"Funkytown"	Lipps Inc.	1	2
10.	"Please Don't Go"	KC and the Sunshine Band	1	2
11.	"Tired of Toein' the Line"	Rocky Burnette	1	2
12.	"Don't Stop til You Get Enough"	Michael Jackson	1	3
13.	"What I Like About You"	The Romantics	2	
14.	"Dreaming My Dreams With You"	Colleen Hewett	2	
15.	"Upside Down"	Diana Ross	1	4
16.	"Moscow"	Dschinghis Khan	1	6
17.	"You've Lost That Lovin' Feelin'"	Long John Baldry & Kathi McDonald	2	
18.	"He's My Number One"	Christie Allen	4	
19.	"Call Me"	Blondie	4	
20.	"Babooshka"	Kate Bush	2	
21.	"Woman in Love"	Barbra Streisand	1	2
22.	"Coming Up"	Paul McCartney	2	
23.	"Shandi"	Kiss	5	
24.	"Blame It on the Boogie"	The Jacksons	4	
25.	"Ashes to Ashes"	David Bowie	3	

These charts are calculated by David Kent of the Kent Music Report.
