= List of number-one hits of 1981 (Argentina) =

This is a list of the songs that reached number one in Argentina in 1981, according to Cashbox magazine with data provided by the Argentine Chamber of Phonograms and Videograms Producers.

Issue date	Song	Artist(s)
January 10	"Tired of Toein' the Line"	Rocky Burnette
January 17	"Tired of Toein' the Line"	Rocky Burnette
January 24	"Tired of Toein' the Line"	Rocky Burnette
January 31	"Tired of Toein' the Line"	Rocky Burnette
February 7	"Tired of Toein' the Line"	Rocky Burnette
February 14	"Ahora o nunca"	Ángela Carrasco
February 21	"Ahora o nunca"	Ángela Carrasco
February 28	"Ahora o nunca"	Ángela Carrasco
March 7	"Another One Bites the Dust"	Queen
March 14	"Another One Bites the Dust"	Queen
March 21	"Another One Bites the Dust"	Queen
March 28	"Another One Bites the Dust"	Queen
April 4	"Another One Bites the Dust"	Queen
April 11	"Another One Bites the Dust"	Queen
April 18	"Tremendo Amor"	María Celeste
May 2	"Tremendo Amor"	María Celeste
May 9	"Tremendo Amor"	María Celeste
May 16	"Tremendo Amor"	María Celeste
May 23	"My Turn to Love You"	Eddy Grant
May 30	"My Turn to Love You"	Eddy Grant
June 6	"My Turn to Love You"	Eddy Grant
June 13	"My Turn to Love You"	Eddy Grant
June 20	"My Turn to Love You"	Eddy Grant
June 27	"My Turn to Love You"	Eddy Grant
July 4	"Papucho Amor"	Lucrecia Duran
July 18	"Tu per me"	Franco Simone
July 25	"Do You Feel My Love"	Eddy Grant
August 8	"Tú Me Prometiste Volver"	Pimpinela
August 22	"Tú Me Prometiste Volver"	Pimpinela
August 29	"Tú Me Prometiste Volver"	Pimpinela
September 5	"All Out of Love"	Air Supply
September 12	"Tú Me Prometiste Volver"	Pimpinela
September 19	"Tú Me Prometiste Volver"	Pimpinela
September 26	"Bette Davis Eyes"	Kim Carnes
October 10	"Bette Davis Eyes"	Kim Carnes
October 17	"Frente a frente"	Jeanette
November 7	"Bette Davis Eyes"	Kim Carnes
November 14	"Frente a frente"	Jeanette
November 21	"Frente a frente"	Jeanette
December 5	"El baile de los pajaritos"	Parchís
December 12	"El baile de los pajaritos"	Parchís

== See also ==
- 1981 in music
