= List of top 25 albums for 1981 in Australia =

Top 25 albums of 1981 < 1980 1982 >

Other Australian top charts for 1981
- top 25 singles

Australian top 40 charts for the 1980s
- singles
- albums

Australian number-one charts of 1981
- albums
- singles

The following lists the top 25 (end of year) charting albums on the Australian Album Charts, for the year of 1981. These were the best charting albums in Australia for 1981. The source for this year is the Kent Music Report, known from 1987 onwards as the Australian Music Report.

#	Title	Artist	Highest pos. reached	Weeks at No. 1
1.	Double Fantasy	John Lennon & Yoko Ono	1	10 (pkd #1 in 1980 & 81)
2.	Sirocco	Australian Crawl	1	6
3.	Back in Black	AC/DC	1	1
4.	Bad Habits	Billy Field	1	2
5.	Making Movies	Dire Straits	6	
6.	Icehouse	Flowers	4	
7.	Face Value	Phil Collins	2	
8.	Hotter Than July	Stevie Wonder	3	
9.	Christopher Cross	Christopher Cross	6	
10.	Corroboree	Split Enz	1	3
11.	Zenyatta Mondatta	The Police	1	1
12.	Tattoo You	Rolling Stones	1	11
13.	Greatest Hits	Dr. Hook	1	4
14.	The Jazz Singer	Neil Diamond	10	
15.	Arc of a Diver	Steve Winwood	5	
16.	The Beatles Ballads	The Beatles	1	7
17.	Bella Donna	Stevie Nicks	1	1
18.	Time	Electric Light Orchestra	3	
19.	Stars on 45 Long Play Album	Stars on 45	1	2
20.	Devo Live (Mini LP)	Devo	2	
21.	Long Distance Voyager	The Moody Blues	7	
22.	Swingshift	Cold Chisel	1	2
23.	Kings of the Wild Frontier	Adam and the Ants	2	
24.	Chemistry	Mondo Rock	3	
25.	Vienna	Ultravox	4	

These charts are calculated by David Kent of the Kent Music Report and they are based on the number of weeks and position the records reach within the top 100 albums for each week.

source: David Kent's Australian Chart Book 1970-1992
