= Come Upstairs =

Studio album by Carly Simon
- Released: June 16, 1980
- Recorded: October 1979 – May 1980
- Studios: Power Station, New York City
- Genre: Rock
- Length: 38:56
- Label: Warner Bros.
- Producer: Mike Mainieri

Carly Simon chronology
Spy (1979)	Come Upstairs (1980)	Torch (1981)

Singles from Come Upstairs
- 1. "Jesse" Released: July 9, 1980; 2. "Take Me As I Am" Released: 1980; 3. "Come Upstairs" Released: 1980

Come Upstairs is the ninth studio album by American singer-songwriter Carly Simon, released by Warner Bros. Records on June 16, 1980.

It was the first of her three albums for Warner Bros. and it has a harder, more rock-oriented sound than her previous albums. Whereas those earlier records were prime examples of the singer-songwriter genre, with soft-rocking arrangements primarily built around piano and/or acoustic guitar accompaniment, Come Upstairs uses electric guitars and synthesizers prominently. The album was a commercial success; it reached No. 36 on the Billboard 200 and remained on the chart for eight months.

The first single released from the album was "Jesse", an acoustic ballad that was more in the style of Simon's earlier work rather than an example of her new sound. "Jesse" became a major hit, remaining on the Billboard Hot 100 singles chart for over six months, peaking at No. 11, and was certified Gold by the RIAA for sales of more than 1,000,000 copies in the United States alone. It also reached No. 12 in Canada, and No. 4 in Australia, becoming Simon's biggest hit there since "You're So Vain" in 1973.

== Reception ==
Professional ratings
Review scores
Source	Rating
AllMusic	3/5 stars

AllMusic reviewer William Ruhlmann retrospectively called "Jesse" the album's highlight and declared it "Simon's best-written pop/rock song since 'You're So Vain' and a Top Ten hit to boot." He additionally singled out the title track as "frisky and seductive", referred to "Take Me as I Am" as "an upbeat raver", and compared the track "Them" to the band Devo. Ruhlmann stated "Simon's emotions were unusually close to the surface throughout, 'James' was a final plea to her soon-to-depart husband, and 'In Pain' was the brutal cry of someone who sounded like she was."

Reviewing the single "Jesse", Billboard wrote that "the melody is simple yet powerful, the words are complex and Simon's voice has never been better. She croons an enriching country-ish melody which perks up at the end with the addition of electric guitar, and complements it with a sensitive story." Cash Box said that the song "embodies the push and pull of love, the ailment and the cure - the person we try to resist but cannot."

Reviewing the single "Take Me As I Am", Record World said that "Carly is distraught over a lover with a wandering heart" and praised the hook. The magazine also called the title track a "saucy invitation [that] is full of lyrical nocturnal delights."

== Track listing ==
Credits adapted from the album's liner notes.

Side one
No.	Title	Writer(s)	Length
1.	"Come Upstairs"	Carly Simon	4:18
2.	"Stardust"	Simon	4:13
3.	"Them"	Simon	3:44
4.	"Jesse"	Simon	4:15
5.	"James"	Simon	2:28

Side two
No.	Title	Writer(s)	Length
1.	"In Pain"	Simon; Mike Mainieri; Don Grolnick	6:10
2.	"The Three Of Us in the Dark"	Simon	4:14
3.	"Take Me As I Am"	Simon; Mainieri; Sid McGinnis	4:50
4.	"The Desert"	Simon	4:44
Total length:			38:56

== Personnel ==
=== Musicians ===
- Carly Simon – vocals, backing vocals (1-4, 7-9), acoustic guitar (4)
- Kinny Landrum – Prophet-5 (1)
- Billy Mernit – electric piano (1, 9)
- Mike Mainieri – acoustic piano (1, 5, 7–9), backing vocals (3), Oberheim synthesizer (1), Prophet-5 (2), Oberheim OB-X (2), Yamaha CS30 (3), synthesizers (8, 9), marimba (9)
- Ed Walsh – Oberheim OB-X (1), Oberheim synthesizer programming (1, 8), Oberheim Eight Voice programming (2)
- Larry Fast – synthesizers (3)
- Don Grolnick – acoustic piano (4, 6)
- Peter Hewlett – electric guitar (1–3, 6), acoustic guitar (4, 8)
- Sid McGinnis – lead guitar (1–3), backing vocals (3, 4), guitar solo (2, 6), electric slide guitar (4), electric guitar (7–9), acoustic guitar (9), 12-string guitar (9)
- Tony Levin – bass guitar (1–4, 6–8), fretless bass (5, 9)
- Steve Gadd – drums (1)
- Rick Marotta – drums (2–9)
- Jerry Grossman – cello (5)

Background vocalists

- James Taylor – backing vocals (2–4)
- Mariah Aguiar – backing vocals (3)
- Peter Hewlett – backing vocals (3, 4)
- Christine Martin – backing vocals (3)
- Laraine Newman – backing vocals (3)
- Hugh Taylor – backing vocals (3, 4)
- Alex Taylor – backing vocals (3, 4)
- Sally Taylor – backing vocals (4)
- Gail Boggs – backing vocals (4)

=== Production ===
- Mike Mainieri – producer
- Scott Litt – recording, mixing
- James Farber – assistant engineer
- Jeff Hendrickson – assistant engineer
- Lucy Laurie – assistant engineer
- Raymond Willard – assistant engineer
- Bob Ludwig – mastering at Masterdisk (New York, NY)
- Christine Martin – production coordinator
- Peter Whorf – art direction
- Bill Gerber – design concept
- Mick Rock – photography
- Susan Turner – hand lettering
- Arlyne Rothberg – management

== Charts ==
Chart (1980)	Peak position
Australian Albums (Kent Music Report)	43
Canada Top Albums/CDs (RPM)	86
US Billboard 200	36
US Cash Box Top 100 Albums	37

== See also ==
- List of Top 25 singles for 1981 in Australia
