= List of top 25 singles for 1981 in Australia =

Top 25 singles of 1981 < 1980 1982 >

Other Australian top charts for 1981
- top 25 albums

Australian top 40 charts for the 1980s
- singles
- albums

Australian number-one charts of 1981
- albums
- singles

The following lists the top 25 (end of year) charting singles on the Australian Singles Charts, for the year of 1981. These were the best charting singles in Australia for 1981. The source for this year is the "Kent Music Report".

#	Title	Artist	Highest pos. reached	Weeks at No. 1
1.	"Counting the Beat"	The Swingers	1	3
2.	"Stars on 45"	Stars on 45	1	4
3.	"Antmusic"	Adam and the Ants	1	5
4.	"Jealous Guy"	Roxy Music	1	4
5.	"Devo Live (EP)"	Devo	1	3
6.	"Bette Davis Eyes"	Kim Carnes	1	5
7.	"Nine to Five (Morning Train)"	Sheena Easton	1	2
8.	"Endless Love"	Diana Ross & Lionel Richie	1	5
9.	"Who Can It Be Now?"	Men at Work	2	
10.	"Kids in America"	Kim Wilde	5	
11.	"This Ole House"	Shakin' Stevens	1	1
12.	"Turn Me Loose"	Loverboy	3	
13.	"Start Me Up"	The Rolling Stones	1	1
14.	"You Weren't in Love with Me"	Billy Field	1	1
15.	"Jessie's Girl"	Rick Springfield	1	1
16.	"Duncan"	Slim Dusty	1	2
17.	"Girls Can Get It"	Dr Hook	3	
18.	"(Just Like) Starting Over"	John Lennon	1	4
19.	"You Drive Me Crazy"	Shakin' Stevens	1	3
20.	"Keep on Loving You"	REO Speedwagon	3	
21.	"Louise (We Get It Right)"	Jona Lewie	2	
22.	"Gotta Pull Myself Together"	The Nolans	3	
23.	"In the Air Tonight"	Phil Collins	3	
24.	"Precious to Me"	Phil Seymour	6	
25.	"Jesse"	Carly Simon	4	

These charts are calculated by David Kent of the Kent Music Report.
