= You Know That I Love You =

You Know That I Love You may refer to:

- "You Know That I Love You" (Christie Allen song), 1978
- "You Know That I Love You" (Santana song), 1979
- "You Know That I Love You" (Donell Jones song), 2002
