= Goosebumps (BA Robertson song) =

1979 single by BA Robertson

Single by BA Robertson

from the album Initial Success
- B-side: "The B side"
- Released: January 1979
- Studio: Mayfair Studios, London
- Genre: Pop rock
- Length: 2:31
- Label: Asylum
- Songwriter(s): BA Robertson; Terry Britten
- Producer(s): Terry Britten

BA Robertson singles chronology
"All the Thin Men" (1976)	"Goosebumps" (1979)	"Bang Bang" (1979)

"Goosebumps" is a pop song written by Terry Britten and BA Robertson and originally released by Robertson in January 1979 as the first single from his debut album Initial Success. The single flopped, but later that year, Australian pop singer Christie Allen covered the song, which peaked at number 3 on Kent Music Report in Australia and sold over 60,000 copies

The song was his first release on Asylum Records after they signed him due to the strength of this song on a demo tape he sent to their parent company Warner Communications.

== Christie Allen version ==
"Goose Bumps"
- German cover art

Single by Christie Allen

from the album Magic Rhythm
- B-side: "Ships That Pass Through the Night"; "Count Me Out"
- Released: August 1979
- Studio: Mayfair Studios, London
- Genre: Pop
- Length: 2:50
- Label: Mushroom
- Songwriter(s): Terry Britten; BA Robertson
- Producer(s): Terry Britten

Christie Allen singles chronology
"Falling in Love with Only You" (1979)	"Goose Bumps" (1979)	"He's My Number One" (1980)

Allen released her cover in August 1979 as the third single from her debut studio album, Magic Rhythm. The song was released as "Goose Bumps" on both the single and the album. It released in the US via Polydor Records and in Europe via WEA. At the 1979 Countdown awards, the song was nominated for Most Popular Single, won by "Computer Games" by Mi-Sex. "Goose Bumps" became the first ever single by Mushroom Records to be certified gold in Australia.

=== Reception ===
Cash Box magazine said "Bouncy bass and synthesiser set the tick-tock danceable pace for Christie Allen's crystal voice."

=== Track listing ===
7" (K 7608)

- Side A – "Goosebumps" - 2:50
- Side B – "Ships That Pass Through the Night" - 3:20

7" (International)

- Side A – "Goosebumps" - 2:50
- Side B - "Count Me Out"

=== Charts ===
==== Weekly charts ====
Chart (1979–80)	Peak position
Australian Kent Music Report	3
New Zealand (Recorded Music NZ)	37

==== Year-end charts ====
Chart (1979)	Rank
Australia (Kent Music Report)	28

=== Certifications ===
Region	Certification	Certified units/sales
Australia (ARIA)	Gold	50,000^{^}
^{^} Shipments figures based on certification alone.
