= Falling in Love with Only You =

Single by Christie Allen

from the album Magic Rhythm
- B-side: "Under Lock and Key"
- Released: March 1979
- Studio: Slater Sound Studios
- Genre: Pop
- Length: 3:35
- Label: Mushroom Records
- Songwriter(s): Terry Britten
- Producer(s): Terry Britten

Christie Allen singles chronology
"You Know That I Love You" (1978)	"Falling in Love with Only You" (1979)	"Goosebumps" (1979)

"Falling in Love with Only You" is a pop song written and produced by Terry Britten and recorded by Australian pop singer Christie Allen. The song was released in March 1979 as the second single from Allen's debut studio album, Magic Rhythm (1979). The song peaked at number 20 on the Kent Music Report in Australia.

== Track listing ==
7" (K 7400)

- Side A – "Falling in Love with Only You" - 3:35
- Side B – "Under Lock And Key" - 2:53

== Charts ==
Chart (1979)	Peak position
Australian Kent Music Report	20
