= List of top 25 singles for 1979 in Australia =

Top 25 singles of 1979 < 1978 1980 >

Other Australian top charts for 1979
- top 25 albums

Australian top 40 charts for the 1980s
- singles
- albums

Australian number-one charts of 1979
- albums
- singles

The following lists the top 25 (end of year) charting singles on the Australian Singles Charts, for the year of 1979. These were the best charting singles in Australia for 1979. The source for this year is the "Kent Music Report".

#	Title	Artist	Highest pos. reached	Weeks at No. 1
1.	"Lay Your Love on Me"	Racey	1	8
2.	"I Was Made For Lovin' You"	Kiss	2	
3.	"Heart of Glass"	Blondie	1	5
4.	"Some Girls"	Racey	1	4
5.	"Born to Be Alive"	Patrick Hernandez	1	5
6.	"I Don't Like Mondays"	The Boomtown Rats	1	2
7.	"Da Ya Think I'm Sexy?"	Rod Stewart	1	2
8.	"Le Freak"	Chic	1	5
9.	"Knock on Wood"	Amii Stewart	2	
10.	"Pop Muzik"	M	1	3
11.	"My Sharona"	The Knack	1	5
12.	"Make Love to Me"	Kelly Marie	5	
13.	"Up There Cazaly"	The Two-Man Band	1	1
14.	"Baby It's You"	Promises	2	
15.	"YMCA"	Village People	1	5
16.	"Stumblin' In"	Suzi Quatro & Chris Norman	2	
17.	"Hot Stuff"	Donna Summer	1	1
18.	"Video Killed the Radio Star"	The Buggles	1	7 (pkd #1 79 & 80)
19.	"Computer Games"	Mi-Sex	1	1
20.	"Bright Eyes"	Art Garfunkel	2	
21.	"Lucky Number"	Lene Lovich	2	
22.	"C'mon Aussie C'mon"	The Mojo Singers	1	2
23.	"On the Inside"	Lynne Hamilton	4	
24.	"We Don't Talk Anymore"	Cliff Richard	3	
25.	"I Will Survive"	Gloria Gaynor	5	

These charts are calculated by David Kent of the Kent Music Report.
