= Magic Rhythm =

Studio album by Christie Allen
- Released: November 1979
- Studios: Slater Sound Studios, Mayfair Studios, London
- Genre: Pop
- Label: Mushroom Records
- Producer: Terry Britten

Christie Allen chronology
Magic Rhythm (1979)	Detour (1980)

Singles from Magic Rhythm
- 1. "You Know That I Love You" Released: September 1978; 2. "Falling in Love with Only You" Released: March 1979; 3. "Goosebumps" Released: August 1979; 4. "He's My Number One" Released: January 1980; 5. "Magic Rhythm" Released: May 1980

Magic Rhythm is the debut studio album by Australian pop singer Christie Allen. The album peaked at No.59 on the Australian charts. It featured two top 5 singles. The song "Count Me Out" was previously recorded by Cliff Richard on his 1978 album Green Light.

== Track listing ==
Side A (L 37075)
No.	Title	Writer(s)	Length
1.	"Magic Rhythm"	Terry Britten, B. A. Robertson	3:05
2.	"All Australian Female"	Britten, Robertson	2:49
3.	"Only Yes Will Do"	Britten, Robertson	4:05
4.	"Goosebumps"	Britten, Robertson	2:50
5.	"Falling in Love with Only You"	Britten	3:30

Side B
No.	Title	Writer(s)	Length
1.	"He's My Number One"	Britten, Robertson	3:00
2.	"Count Me Out"	Britten, Bruce Welch	4:04
3.	"Fallin' in Luv"	Britten, Robertson	2:52
4.	"You Know That I Love You"	Britten	3:20
5.	"Ships That Pass Through the Night"	Britten	3:21

== Personnel ==
=== London recordings ===
- Christie Allen - Vocals
- Terry Britten - Guitars, Bass on "Only Yes Will Do", Gizmotron on "All Australian Female" and "Fallin' In Luv"
- Billy Livesy - Piano, Organ, Synthesiser, Melodica, Flute
- Graham Jarvis - Drums, Percussion
- Paul Westwood - Bass

=== Australian recordings ===
"You Know That I Love You", "Ships That Pass In The Night", "Falling In Love With Only You"

- Christie Allen - Vocals
- Terry Britten - Guitars
- James Rigg - Piano
- Geoffrey Skews - Synthesiser
- Mike Clarke - Bass
- Graham Morgan - Drums
- Christie Allen, Terry Britten, B.A. Robertson - Harmony Vocals

== Charts ==
Chart (1979/80)	Peak position
Australian Kent Music Report Albums Chart	59

== Certifications ==
Region	Certification	Certified units/sales
United Kingdom (BPI)	Gold	100,000^{^}
^{^} Shipments figures based on certification alone.
