= List of top 25 albums for 1979 in Australia =

Top 25 albums of 1979 < 1978 1980 >

Other Australian top charts for 1979
- top 25 singles

Australian top 40 charts for the 1980s
- singles
- albums

Australian number-one charts of 1979
- albums
- singles

The following lists the top 25 (end of year) charting albums on the Australian Album Charts, for the year of 1979. These were the best charting albums in Australia for 1979. The source for this year is the "Kent Music Report", known from 1987 onwards as the "Australian Music Report".

#	Title	Artist	Highest pos. reached	Weeks at No. 1
1.	Breakfast in America	Supertramp	1	6
2.	Discovery	Electric Light Orchestra	1	6
3.	Dynasty	Kiss	2	
4.	Blondes Have More Fun	Rod Stewart	1	6
5.	52nd Street	Billy Joel	1	5 (pkd #1 in 1978 & 79)
6.	Spirits Having Flown	Bee Gees	1	5
7.	The Bob Seger Collection	Bob Seger	1	2
8.	The Very Best of Leo Sayer	Leo Sayer	1	1
9.	Rickie Lee Jones	Rickie Lee Jones	1	6
10.	Dire Straits	Dire Straits	1	3 (pkd #1 in 1978)
11.	Minute by Minute	Doobie Brothers	6	
12.	Parallel Lines	Blondie	2	
13.	Toto	Toto	2	
14.	Barbra Streisand's Greatest Hits Vol. 2	Barbra Streisand	2	
15.	Breakfast at Sweethearts	Cold Chisel	4	
16.	In Through the Out Door	Led Zeppelin	3	
17.	Face to Face	The Angels	18	
18.	Slow Train Coming	Bob Dylan	1	2
19.	Get the Knack	The Knack	1	4
20.	You Don't Bring Me Flowers	Neil Diamond	5	
21.	Bad Girls	Donna Summer	6	
22.	Back to the Egg	Wings	3	
23.	Nicolette	Nicolette Larson	6	
24.	Fate for Breakfast	Art Garfunkel	3	
25.	The Long Run	The Eagles	1	3

These charts are calculated by David Kent of the Kent Music Report and they are based on the number of weeks and position the records reach within the top 100 albums for each week.

source: David Kent's "Australian Chart Book 1970-1992"
