= You Know That I Love You (Christie Allen song) =

Single by Christie Allen

from the album Magic Rhythm
- B-side: "Nashville Tennessee"
- Released: September 1978
- Studio: Slater Sound Studios
- Genre: Pop
- Length: 3:20
- Label: Mushroom Records
- Songwriter(s): Terry Britten
- Producer(s): Terry Britten

Christie Allen singles chronology
"You Know That I Love You" (1978)	"Falling in Love with Only You" (1979)

"You Know That I Love You" is a pop song written and produced by Terry Britten and recorded by Australian pop singer Christie Allen. The song was released in September 1978 as Allen's debut single and lead single from Allen's debut studio album, Magic Rhythm (1979). The song peaked at number 67 on the Kent Music Report in Australia.

== Track listing ==
7" (K 7248)

- Side A – "You Know That I Love You"
- Side B – "Nashville Tennessee"

== Charts ==
Chart (1978)	Peak position
Australian Kent Music Report	67
