= Jesse Saunders =

American house music artist (born 1962)

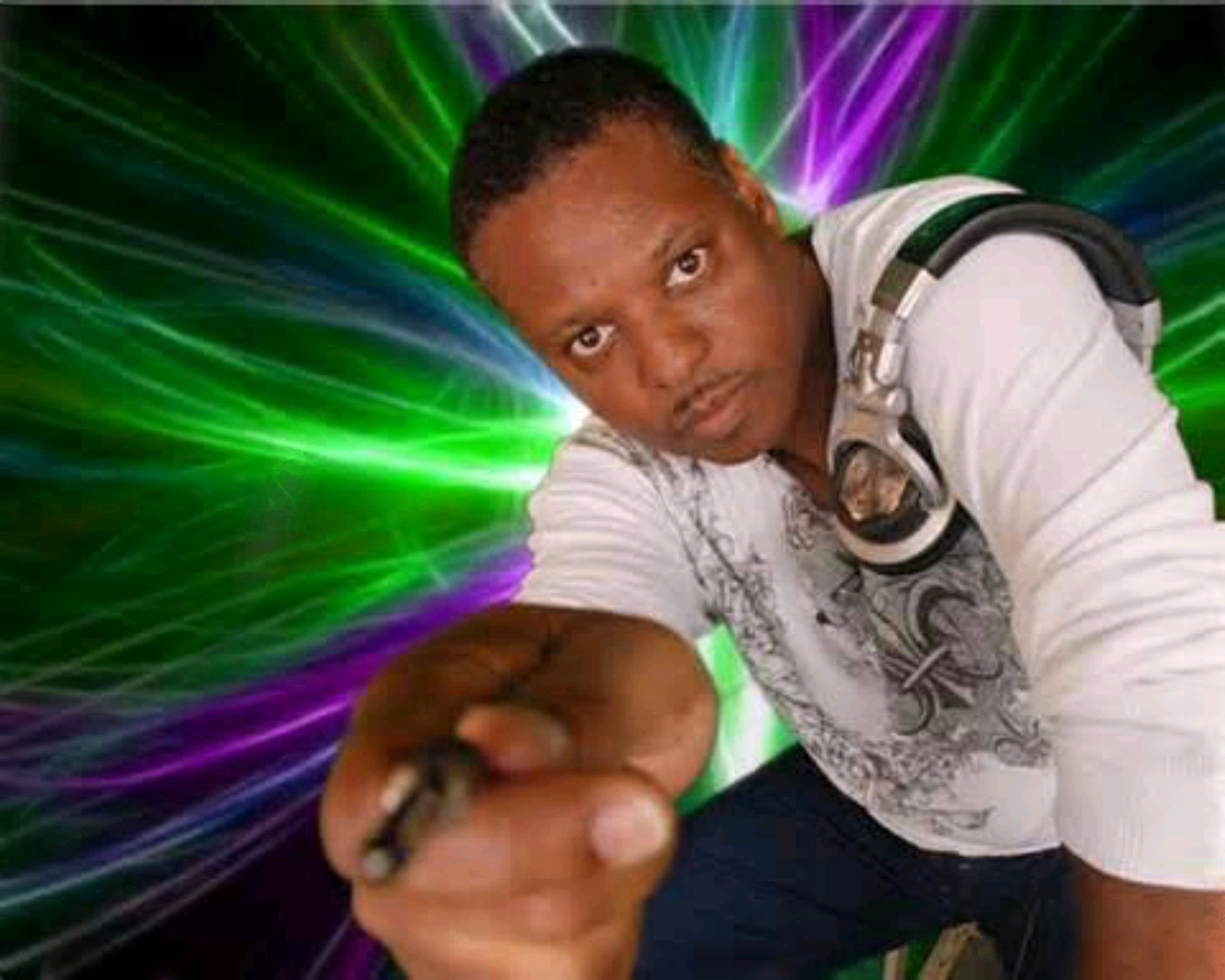

Background information
- Born: March 10, 1962 (age 64); Chicago, Illinois, U.S.
- Genres: House
- Occupations: DJ; record producer; film producer; entrepreneur
- Years active: 1977–present
- Label: Geffen
- Website: therealjessesaunders.com

Jesse Saunders (born on 10 March 1962) is an American house music musician, DJ, record producer, film producer, and entrepreneur. His 1984 single, "On & On", co-written with Vince Lawrence, is widely regarded as one of the first house music records to be commercially released on vinyl. Throughout his career, Saunders has founded and managed multiple independent record labels, produced music and films, and worked in artist promotion and management. He is a member of The Recording Academy (formerly the National Academy of Recording Arts and Sciences).

== Early years ==
Saunders was born and raised on the south side of Chicago. He attended St. Columbanus Kindergarten and Reavis Elementary School, where his mother, Lois M. Saunders, was a teacher. At the age of 10, Saunders learned to program and operate computers. He also performed and toured with the Chicago Children's Choir. Saunders graduated from Charles S. Deneen Public School before attending Hyde Park's Kenwood Academy as an honor student. He played intramural tennis and led his team to three City of Chicago Championships and one second-place finish, earning a letterman's jacket. During this time, Saunders was selected by the city of Chicago's "Youth Action" program, which trains student athletes. During high school, Saunders' older stepbrother, DJ Wayne Williams, mentored him in DJing. Starting in 1991, the two produced the annual Chosen Few House Music Reunion Picnic in Chicago, which has drawn crowds of over 30,000. Saunders studied communications and film at the University of Southern California in Los Angeles. His interest in music began with studying piano at age five, eventually exploring other instruments. His early musical influences included Aretha Franklin, Fleetwood Mac, Smokey Robinson, and Earth, Wind & Fire.

== Career ==
=== Chicago house ===
At the age of sixteen, Saunders was exposed to Chicago's night club scene through the music of Frankie Knuckles. Knuckles held residencies at gay nightclubs, primarily the Warehouse in Chicago, where house music began before expanding and evolving. In 1982, he opened his own nightclub, the Playground. Saunders incorporated his original material into his sets, expanding his musical repertoire beyond disco and R&B (as Knuckles did) and developing his style. As a DJ, he used loops and repetition for accentuation, focusing on sections stripped down to just the drum or bass — a tradition he carried on as a producer.

In 1983, Saunders began producing his own music. In early 1984, he and Vince Lawrence released "On & On" on the label they founded together, Jes Say Records. Saunders composed the track with Lawrence to replace a record that had been stolen from Saunders's collection, the "On & On" bootleg disco Megamix by Mach 1980.

That Megamix, a pastiche of loops from several disco records, particularly the bassline from Player One's "Space Invaders" (1979) and Lipps Inc's "Funkytown" (1980), had been Saunders's "signature" tune as a DJ. Saunders & Lawrence added lyrics and electronic instruments, utilizing a Roland TR-808 drum machine as electronic percussion as well as a Korg Poly-61 synthesizer and Roland TB-303 bass synthesizer.

"Funk U Up" (the first house track to chart on Billboard), "Real Love", "Love Can't Turn Around", and "Dum Dum" soon followed. Saunders' group, Jesse's Gang, was eventually signed to Geffen Records, releasing the album Center of Attraction shortly after. The single "I'm Back Again" became a top-ten club hit.

=== Touring ===
By the late 1980s, Saunders decided to focus on writing, producing, and remixing instead of DJing, then returned to DJing throughout the 1990s. In this decade, he toured the world and produced music for television. His independent label, Broken Records, distributed music via the Internet. Since 1991, Saunders has been involved in House Music Reunion Picnic, celebrated every Fourth of July weekend. In 1997, he reunited with the other forefathers of house music to release Chicago Reunion Album.

In 2004, after touring the world, Saunders revived his Broken Records label, which releases digital content from many major download sites and features artists such as Inaya Day, Scott Langley, Sound Syndicate, Igor Garnier, Didier Vanelli, Mia Calderon, Joe Smooth, Marshall Jefferson, and Jesse Saunders.

In 2009, Saunders released the album 25th Anniversary of House Music, leading to a worldwide tour featuring art depicting the culture and pioneers of the genre. The tour went throughout the US and Johannesburg, South Africa.

After the 25th anniversary of the House Music Tour, Saunders founded the Electronic Music Cafe in Las Vegas, Nevada. in 2010 to display the art from the tour. He also founded the Music & Arts Society, a non-profit for the advancement and preservation of DJ culture, with the launch of the world's first DJ Culture exhibit entitled "SPIN – Evolution of the DJ" that same year.

That same year, Saunders produced and released the first installment of the Above The Sound Cloud compilation series, as well as the first Chilled & UnBroken compilation series and the DJ Divas album.

=== Writing ===
In 2020 Saunders released a book, titled In Their Own Words.

== Personal life ==
Saunders' maternal grandfather, Robert H. Miller, a funeral business owner and founder of the National Funeral Directors and Mortician's Association, was voted "Mayor" of Bronzeville from 1937 to 1939. He also became heavily involved in the American civil rights movement, walking with Martin Luther King Jr. in the 1965 Selma to Montgomery marches and erecting a statue in honor of King in Selma, Alabama. Miller also promoted the career of gospel singer Mahalia Jackson and owned and operated the Grand Ballroom, which showcased artists such as Cab Calloway and Count Basie.

Saunders married actress and musician Jazsmin Lewis in 1992, and the couple divorced in 1998. He now lives in Las Vegas, Nevada.

In 2022, Saunders suffered a stroke.

== Selected discography ==
=== Releases ===
- On & On (1984)
- Funk U Up (1984)
- Undercover (1984)
- Fantasy (1984)
- Dum Dum (1984)
- Real Love (1985)
- I Am The DJ (1985)
- Dum Dum 2 (1985)
- Love Can't Turn Around (1986)
- Back Up (1987)
- I'm Back Again (1988)
- Sing Sing in the 90's (1990)
- House Trax, Vol. 1 (1991)
- Light My Fire (1992)
- Got Me Runnin (1993)
- I Just Want To (1993)
- Take Me Higher (1996)
- Yeah/Let Me Hear U (1997)
- 12 Inches of Love (1998)
- Body Music (1999)
- Excited (2002)
- On & On (20th Anniversary of House-2003)
- Everybody (2004)
- Feelin Me (2005)
- Luv 2 Luv U (2008)
- House Muzik Album (2008)
- On & On (25th Anniversary Remixes-2009)
- What's This FX (2010)
- I Hear House Music (2011)
- House Music Buffet (2011)
- MainLine (2012)
- Now That We Found Love (2013)
- Sunshine (2016)
- Shout (2017)
- Kaleidoscope (2018)
- On & On (35th Anniversary Remixes-2019)
- Higher (2019)

=== Remixes ===
- Showdown – No Sovereign (1987)
- It's A Cold, Cold World – lNouveau (1988)
- Come Fly With Me – DJ Pierre (1990)
- My Girl – Kool Skool (1990)
- Vibeology – Paula Abdul (1991)
- We Want The Funk – Gerardo (1991)
- Set Me Free – Jermaine Stewart (1992)
- Where Do We Go – Simple Pleasure (1992)
- Double Good Everything – Smokey Robinson (1992)
- Damn It Feels Good – Geto Boyz (1992)
- What's It Take – Mellow Man Ace (1993)
- Stranger – Buzz Session (1994)
- Loving Tonight – Honey Vox (1994)
- Slide – El Debarge (1995)
- Baby Wants To Ride – Frankie Knuckles (1997)
- Turn It Out – Rick James (1999)
- Fuck It (I Don't Want You Back) (2002)
- Step In The Name of Love – R. Kelly (2003)
- Love Dealer - Ryan Brahms (2017)
- Pounder - VMS (2018)
