= List of top 25 albums for 1978 in Australia =

Top 25 albums of 1978 < 1977 1979 >

Other Australian top charts for 1978
- top 25 singles

Australian top 40 charts for the 1980s
- singles
- albums

Australian number-one charts of 1978
- albums
- singles

The following lists the top 25 (end of year) charting albums on the Australian Album Charts, for the year of 1978. These were the best charting albums in Australia for 1978. The source for this year is the "Kent Music Report", known from 1987 onwards as the "Australian Music Report".

#	Title	Artist	Highest pos. reached	Weeks at No. 1
1.	Saturday Night Fever	Various Artists	1	13
2.	Bat Out of Hell	Meat Loaf	1	8
3.	Grease	Various Artists	1	9 (also pkd #1 in 1991 for 2 weeks)
4.	Simple Dreams	Linda Ronstadt	1	5
5.	The Stranger	Billy Joel	2	
6.	The War of the Worlds	Jeff Wayne & Various Artists	1	7
7.	Rumours	Fleetwood Mac	1	8 (pkd #1 in 1977 & 78)
8.	City to City	Gerry Rafferty	3	
9.	Some Girls	Rolling Stones	3	
10.	The Kick Inside	Kate Bush	3	
11.	Out of the Blue	Electric Light Orchestra	3	
12.	Kaya	Bob Marley and the Wailers	5	
13.	Down Two Then Left	Boz Scaggs	4	
14.	Macho Man	Village People	5	
15.	Weekend in L. A.	George Benson	5	
16.	Foot Loose and Fancy Free	Rod Stewart	1	9 (pkd #1 in 1977 & 78)
17.	Nightflight to Venus	Boney M	7	
18.	Sleeper Catcher	Little River Band	4	
19.	Leif Garrett	Leif Garrett	2	
20.	Silk Degrees	Boz Scaggs	1	18 (pkd #1 in 1977)
21.	Street Legal	Bob Dylan	5	
22.	A New World Record	Electric Light Orchestra	1	9 (pkd #1 in 1977)
23.	Living in the USA	Linda Ronstadt	3	
24.	Stranger in Town	Bob Seger	12	
25.	London Town	Wings	3	

These charts are calculated by David Kent of the Kent Music Report and they are based on the number of weeks and position the records reach within the top 100 albums for each week.

source: David Kent's "Australian Chart Book 1970-1992"
