= Detour (Christie Allen album) =

Studio album by Christie Allen
- Released: November 1980
- Recorded: 1980
- Genre: Pop
- Label: Mushroom Records
- Producer: John Hudson

Christie Allen chronology
Magic Rhythm (1980)	Detour (1980)

Singles from Detours
- 1. "Baby Get Away" Released: August 1980; 2. "Switchboard" Released: 17 November 1980; 3. "Don't Put Out the Flame" Released: March 1981

Detours is the second and final studio album by Australian pop singer Christie Allen, released in November 1980. The album peaked at No.96 on the Australian charts.

Though contemporary press reports suggest that the album was, like its predecessor, recorded in London, no studio is mentioned on the sleeve.

== Track listing ==
Side A (L 37489)
No.	Title	Writer(s)	Length
1.	"You Caught Me Out"	Kirsty MacColl	3:29
2.	"City Lights"	Jack Lee	3:39
3.	"Switchboard"	B. A. Robertson, Georg Kajanus	2:47
4.	"Man or Mouse"	Robertson	2:30
5.	"Tell Her You're Mine Tonight"	Oscar Blandamer	3:30
6.	"Sci Fi"	Robertson, Terry Britten	3:11

Side B
No.	Title	Writer(s)	Length
1.	"Baby Get Away"	David Most, Mike Burns, Steve Glen	3:39
2.	"Don't Put Out The Flame"	Britten, William Livsey	3:03
3.	"Long Distance Calling"	Bill Martin, Phil Coulter	3:15
4.	"Monday Through to Friday"	Britten	4:11
5.	"Don't Stop"	Robert John Lange	2:57

== Personnel ==
- Christie Allen - Vocals
- Christie Allen, Nicola Martin, Terry Britten, B. A. Robertson, Steve Glen - Backing Vocals
- Dave Olney - Bass Guitar
- Paul Westwood - Bass Guitars
- Richard Burgess - Drum Machine, Sequencer, Percussion
- Graham Jarvis - Drums, Percussion
- Ricky Hitchcock - Electric Guitar
- Terry Britten - Electric Guitar, Electric Sitar, Acoustic Guitar
- Mike McNaught - Steinway Grand Piano, Music Director
- Billy Livsey - Roland Jupiter 4 Synthesizer, Oberheim OBX Synthesizer, Yamaha CS80 Synthesizer, Electric Piano, Hammond Organ, Melodica
- John Hudson - Roland Jupiter 4 Synthesizer, Roland Vocoder, Steinway Grand Piano, Oberheim OBX Synthesizer, Timpani

== Charts ==
Chart (1980)	Peak position
Australian Kent Music Report Albums Chart	96
