= Baby Get Away =

Single by Christie Allen

from the album Detour
- B-side: "Don't Stop"
- Released: August 1980
- Studio: Mayfair Studios, London
- Genre: Pop, Synth-pop
- Length: 3:44
- Label: Mushroom Records
- Songwriter(s): David Most, Michael Burns, Steve Glen
- Producer(s): John Hudson

Christie Allen singles chronology
"Magic Rhythm" (1980)	"Baby Get Away" (1980)	"Switchboard" (1980)

"Baby Get Away" is a pop song written by David Most, Michael Burns and Steve Glen and recorded by Australian pop singer Christie Allen. The song was released in August 1980 as the lead single from Allen's second studio album, Detour (1980). The song peaked at number 38 on the Kent Music Report in Australia.

== Track listing ==
7" (K 8016)

- Side A – "Baby Get Away" – 3:44
- Side B – "Don't Stop" – 2:57

== Charts ==
Chart (1980)	Peak position
Australian Kent Music Report	38
