= This Is the Devo Box =

Box set by Devo
- Released: 23 July 2008
- Recorded: 1978–1984
- Genres: New wave; punk rock
- Label: Warner Music Japan
- Producers: Brian Eno; Devo; Ken Scott; Robert Margouleff; Roy Thomas Baker

This Is the Devo Box is a seven-disc CD box set compilation of albums by American new wave band Devo, released only in Japan in 2008. It contains all six of the band's studio albums for Warner Bros. Records, spanning the years 1978 to 1984, as well as a greatly expanded version of the 1981 DEV-O Live EP, identical to the 1999 Rhino Handmade CD release. The box features exclusive remasters by mastering engineer Isao Kikuchi and the albums are packaged in miniature LP sleeves with miniaturized versions of the original artwork and pack-ins. The box does not include bonus tracks, although this edition of the New Traditionalists album includes the track "Working in the Coalmine," originally included as a bonus 7" single in some early pressings of the LP.

== Contents ==
- Q. Are We Not Men? A: We Are Devo! (1978)
- Duty Now for the Future (1979)
- Freedom of Choice (1980)
- New Traditionalists (1981)
- Oh, No! It's Devo (1982)
- Shout (1984)
- DEV-O Live (1981/1999)

== Record Store Day LP edition ==
An exclusive vinyl LP version of the box set was released by Rhino Records for Record Store Day 2019. This edition was limited to 3,000 copies worldwide and does not include DEV-O Live. Additionally, the outer box was red (as opposed to the original silver color of the CD edition) and each LP was pressed on different colored vinyl: yellow, purple, red, blue, gold and green, respectively.
