= On & On (Jesse Saunders song) =

Song by Jesse Saunders
- Released: 1984
- Recorded: 1983
- Genre: Chicago house
- Composer: Jesse Saunders
- Producer: Vince Lawrence

"On & On" is a 1984 Chicago house song performed by Jesse Saunders and written with record producer Vince Lawrence. Saunders recorded it using a Roland TR-808 in 1983, based on a mash up of rhythm tracks containing interpolations of "Space Invaders" by Player One, "Bad Girls" by Donna Summer, and a song by the Giorgio Moroder band Munich Machine. The song was released as a single on Jes Say Records in early 1984. It's frequently cited as the first House song released on vinyl.

== Composition ==
Saunders composed the track with Lawrence in order to replace a record which had been stolen from Saunders's collection, the "On & On" bootleg disco megamix by Mach (1980). That megamix, a pastiche of loops from several disco records, particularly the bassline from Player One's "Space Invaders" (1979) and Lipps Inc's "Funkytown" (1980), had been Saunders's "signature" tune as a DJ; it was one that other DJs in the city didn't have or didn't play. Saunders & Lawrence added hypnotic lyrics and electronic instruments, utilizing a Roland TR-808 drum machine as electronic percussion as well as a Korg Poly-61 synthesizer and Roland TB-303 bass synthesizer.
