= Magic Rhythm (song) =

Single by Christie Allen

from the album Magic Rhythm
- B-side: "Only Yes Will Do"
- Released: May 1980
- Studio: Mayfair Studios, London
- Genre: Pop
- Length: 3:04
- Label: Mushroom Records
- Songwriter(s): Terry Britten, B. A. Robertson
- Producer(s): Terry Britten

Christie Allen singles chronology
"He's My Number One" (1980)	"Magic Rhythm" (1980)	"Baby Get Away" (1980)

"Magic Rhythm" is a pop song written by Terry Britten and B. A. Robertson and recorded by Australian pop singer Christie Allen. The song was released in May 1980 as the fifth and final single from Allen's debut studio album, Magic Rhythm (1979). The song peaked at number 38 on the Kent Music Report in Australia.

== Track listing ==
7" (K 7917)

- Side A – "Magic Rhythm" - 3:04
- Side B – "Only Yes Will Do" - 4:00

== Charts ==
Chart (1980)	Peak position
Australian Kent Music Report	38
