= List of top 25 singles for 1978 in Australia =

Top 25 singles of 1978 < 1977 1979 >

Other Australian top charts for 1978
- top 25 albums

Australian top 40 charts for the 1980s
- singles
- albums

Australian number-one charts of 1978
- albums
- singles

The following lists the top 25 (end of year) charting singles on the Australian Singles Charts, for the year of 1978. These were the best charting singles in Australia for 1978. The source for this year is the "Kent Music Report".

#	Title	Artist	Highest pos. reached	Weeks at No. 1
1.	"You're the One that I Want"	Olivia Newton-John & John Travolta	1	9
2.	"Mull of Kintyre"	Wings	1	11 (pkd #1 in 77 & 78)
3.	"Rivers of Babylon"	Boney M	1	6
4.	"Stayin' Alive"	Bee Gees	1	7
5.	"Black Is Black"	La Belle Epoque	1	1
6.	"Macho Man"	Village People	3	
7.	"It's a Heartache"	Bonnie Tyler	1	4
8.	"Three Times a Lady"	The Commodores	1	5
9.	"You Took the Words Right Out of My Mouth"	Meat Loaf	3	
10.	"Baker Street"	Gerry Rafferty	1	1
11.	"Wuthering Heights"	Kate Bush	1	3
12.	"Surfin' U.S.A."	Leif Garrett	2	
13.	"Emotion"	Samantha Sang	2	
14.	"Are You Old Enough?"	Dragon	1	2
15.	"I Can't Stand the Rain"	Eruption	1	1
16.	"Oh Carol"	Smokie	5	
17.	"How Deep Is Your Love"	Bee Gees	3	
18.	"Grease"	Frankie Valli	2	
19.	"Warm Ride"	Graham Bonnet	2	
20.	"Isn't it Time"	The Babys	1	1
21.	"Ebony Eyes"	Bob Welch	3	
22.	"Sometimes When We Touch"	Dan Hill	3	
23.	"Love is in the Air"	John Paul Young	3	
24.	"If I Had Words"	Scott Fitzgerald & Yvonne Keeley	3	
25.	"Rasputin"	Boney M	1	2

These charts are calculated by David Kent of the Kent Music Report.
