= List of top 25 albums for 1980 in Australia =

Top 25 albums of 1980 < 1979 1981 >

Other Australian top charts for 1980
- top 25 singles

Australian top 40 charts for the 1980s
- singles
- albums

Australian number-one charts of 1980
- albums
- singles

The following lists the top 25 (end of year) charting albums on the Australian Album Charts, for the year of 1980. These were the best charting albums in Australia for 1980. The source for this year is the "Kent Music Report", known from 1987 onwards as the "Australian Music Report".

#	Title	Artist	Highest pos. reached	Weeks at No. 1
1.	The Wall	Pink Floyd	1	4
2.	Glass Houses	Billy Joel	2	
3.	True Colours	Split Enz	1	10
4.	East	Cold Chisel	2	
5.	Off the Wall	Michael Jackson	1	2
6.	Stardust	Willie Nelson	5	
7.	The Rose	Soundtrack / Bette Midler	3	
8.	The Boys Light Up	Australian Crawl	4	
9.	Can't Stop the Music	Soundtrack / Village People	1	9
10.	Regatta de Blanc	The Police	1	2
11.	Unmasked	Kiss	3	
12.	Xanadu	Motion Picture Soundtrack	1	6
13.	The B-52's	The B-52's	7	
14.	Back in Black	AC/DC	1	1 (pkd #1 in 1981)
15.	Dynasty	Kiss	2	
16.	Night Rains	Janis Ian	11	
17.	Tusk	Fleetwood Mac	2	
18.	Scary Monsters (And Super Creeps)	David Bowie	1	5
19.	Emotional Rescue	Rolling Stones	4	
20.	Against the Wind	Bob Seger & the Silver Bullet Band	6	
21.	Middle Man	Boz Scaggs	11	
22.	Guilty	Barbra Streisand	1	6
23.	Pretenders	Pretenders	6	
24.	Give Me the Night	George Benson	6	
25.	21 at 33	Elton John	7	

These charts are calculated by David Kent of the Kent Music Report and they are based on the number of weeks and position the records reach within the top 100 albums for each week.

source: David Kent's "Australian Chart Book 1970-1992"
