= Gail Boggs =

American actress

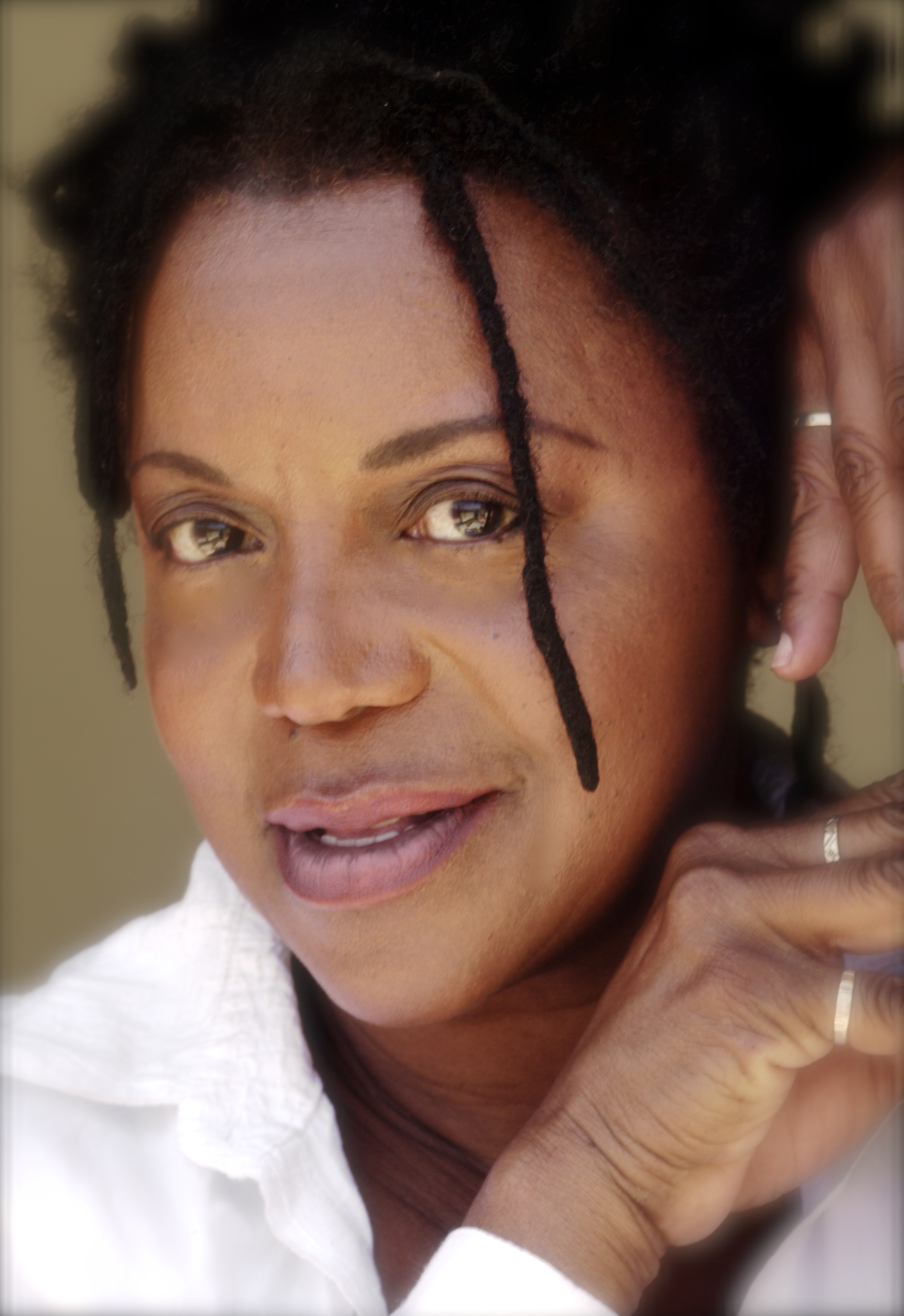
- Boggs in 2014
- Born: Gail Charlene Boggs; August 10, 1951 (age 74); Montclair, New Jersey, U.S.
- Occupation: Actress
- Years active: 1971–present
- Spouse: Eric Larson (m. 1987; div. 2011)
- Children: 2, including Mattie Larson

Gail Charlene Boggs (born August 10, 1951) is an American actress. She played Louise Brown in the 1990 film Ghost.

== Career ==
[Boggs] is a zesty belter in the theatrical pop-soul mold of Donna Summer and Irene Cara.

— Stephen Holden

Gail Boggs, the daughter of Willie Boggs, a tree surgeon, and Alice, a dietitian, described having always dreamed of being a Broadway star. Her professional acting break came in 1971 playing Silvia with a touring group in Australia in a pop-rock version of Shakespeare's play The Two Gentlemen of Verona. She signed with William Morris Agency and went on to act in several plays, including rock opera Mother Earth, an off-Broadway revue, Jesus Christ Superstar, and Candide.

In a 1975 interview, she reported that a chance meeting with Todd Rundgren at an intersection in Manhattan led her to singing backup alongside her friend Darcy Miller and Laura Nyro on Felix Cavaliere's second album, Destiny, before singing with Hall & Oates on War Babies as well as with Carly Simon on Spy and Come Upstairs. During the mid-1970s, Boggs provided vocals and percussion as a member of "The Striders" alongside "The Original Flying Machine"-alum Joel "Bishop" O'Brien and Robbie Dupree. Boggs was also a vocalist in David Sancious's short-lived band "Tone".

In 1984, Boggs starred in the one-woman cabaret nightclub act The Gail Boggs Show at "Upstairs at Greene Street". The show ran weekly for the next year and a half. Boggs was one of the first to hear a recording of Madonna's "Like a Virgin" and she pushed Grammy Award-winning writer and producer Nile Rodgers to release the song as the first single off Madonna's then-upcoming album. Images of Boggs are found in the Martha Swope archive at the New York Public Library.

== Personal life ==
Boggs was married to Eric Larson, a voice actor and music editor. They have two daughters, Willie and Mattie, a former gymnast.

== Acting ==
- 1971: The Two Gentlemen of Verona (Silvia)
- 1972: Derek Walcott's Ti-Jean and His Brothers
- 1972: Mother Earth at the Belasco Theatre
- 1974: Candide (Penitente / Whore / Houri) at the Brooklyn Academy of Music
- 1979: Ain't Misbehavin'
- 1982: Elizabeth Swados's Lullabye and Goodnight (Velvet Puppy)
- 1987: The Bronx Zoo (Roz Hemphill)
- 1988: And God Created Woman (Denise)
- 1989: The Boss (Luanda)
- 1990: Ghost (Louise Brown, sister of Ode Mae Brown played by Whoopi Goldberg)
- 1991: Curly Sue (Anise Hall)
- 1993: Cancelled Lives: Letters from the Inside
- 1995: Get Smart (2nd nurse)
- 1995: Boy Meets World (nurse)
- 1999: EDtv
- 2020: Better Things
