= Jesse (song) =

Single by Carly Simon

from the album Come Upstairs
- B-side: "Stardust"
- Released: July 9, 1980
- Genre: Pop rock
- Length: 4:15
- Label: Warner Bros.
- Songwriter: Carly Simon
- Producer: Mike Mainieri

Carly Simon singles chronology
"Vengeance" (1979)	"Jesse" (1980)	"Why" (1982)

"Jesse" is a song written and performed by American singer-songwriter Carly Simon. Produced by Mike Mainieri, the song served as the lead single from Simon's ninth studio album, Come Upstairs (1980).

The song became a major critical and commercial success for Simon, remaining on the US Billboard charts for six months, and later going Gold. Simon's then-husband, James Taylor, and their daughter, Sally Taylor, sing backup vocals. The single has a country-pop flair, unlike the rest of the album, which is more rock oriented.

== Content ==
The song is told in first-person about the narrator's disdain for her former lover, Jesse, who has just moved back to town. She vows to have nothing to do with him, "Don't let him near me, don't let him touch me, don't let him please me," she sings. She asks her friends to remind her of how he has wronged her, because she fears she'll end up letting her guard down and fall back under his spell. She ends up going back on her promise to herself and the two rekindle their romance. "Jesse, quick come here, I won't tell a soul", "Jesse, that you've come back to me, my friends will all say 'She's gone again'", she sings. She then seeks to comfort her friends because they don't approve. "My friends, let's comfort them, they're feeling bad, they think I've sunk so low," she sings.

Simon later said of the track: "'Jesse' was a song laying plain the fact that good intentions go to hell when you are crazy for someone."

== Chart performance and critical reception ==
"Jesse" was a major success, staying on the US charts for six months; it peaked at No. 11 on the Billboard Hot 100 and No. 8 on the Billboard Adult Contemporary chart. It also hit No. 9 on the Cash Box top singles chart. The single was officially certified Gold by the Recording Industry Association of America (RIAA), Simon's fourth single to achieve this feat, signifying sales of one million copies in the US. The single was also a hit in Australia, peaking at No. 4 on the Kent Music Report, becoming Simon's biggest hit there since "You're So Vain." It also peaked at No. 12 in Canada, making it her 11th Top 40 hit there. One of her biggest hits; Simon has included the song on several of her compilations, including the three-disc box set Clouds in My Coffee (1995), the 2-disc retrospective Anthology (2002), and the single-disc Reflections: Carly Simon's Greatest Hits (2004).

According to Billboard, "the melody is simple yet powerful, the words are complex and Simon's voice has never been better." Cash Box said that the song "embodies the push and pull of love, the ailment and the cure - the person we try to resist but cannot." Record World said that "Carly offers a slick, bouncy package about a one-sided love that won't go away." In a retrospective review for AllMusic, William Ruhlmann called the track "the album's highlight" and declared it "Simon's best-written pop/rock song since 'You're So Vain' and a Top Ten hit to boot."

== Track listing ==
7" single

- "Jesse" – 4:15
- "Stardust" – 4:13

== Personnel ==
- Carly Simon – lead vocals, backing vocals, acoustic guitar
- Don Grolnick – acoustic piano
- Pete Hewlett – acoustic guitar, backing vocals
- Sid McGinnis – electric slide guitar, backing vocals
- Tony Levin – bass
- Rick Marotta – drums
- Gail Boggs – backing vocals
- Alex Taylor – backing vocals
- Hugh Taylor – backing vocals
- James Taylor – backing vocals
- Sally Taylor – backing vocals

== Charts ==
=== Weekly charts ===
Chart (1980–1981)	Peak position
Australia (Kent Music Report)	4
Canada Top Singles (RPM)	12
Canada Adult Contemporary (RPM)	9
New Zealand (Recorded Music NZ)	13
US Billboard Hot 100	11
US Adult Contemporary (Billboard)	8
US Dance Club Songs (Billboard)	80
Quebec (ADISQ)	12

=== Year-end charts ===
Chart (1980)	Position
US Cash Box Top 100	65
Chart (1981)	Position
Australia (Kent Music Report)	25

== Certifications ==
Region	Certification	Certified units/sales
United States (RIAA)	Gold	1,000,000^{^}
^{^} Shipments figures based on certification alone.

== Live performances ==
Despite the massive critical and commercial success of "Jesse" as well as Simon making official music videos for tracks from her previous album Spy (1979), an official video was never made for the song. Simon has performed it in many of her concerts, including two in which it was filmed: Live at Grand Central in 1995 and A Moonlight Serenade on the Queen Mary 2 in 2005.
