= DEV-O Live =

EP by Devo
- Released: March 25, 1981
- Recorded: August 16, 1980
- Venue: Fox Warfield (San Francisco)
- Genres: New wave; punk rock; post-punk
- Length: 17:41 (EP version); 73:52 (CD version)
- Labels: Warner Brothers; Rhino Handmade
- Producer: Devo

Devo chronology
| Freedom of Choice (1980) | DEV-O Live (1981) | New Traditionalists (1981) |

Professional ratings
Review scores
| Source | Rating |
|---|---|
| AllMusic | 2/5 stars |
| Sounds | 4/5 stars |

DEV-O Live is a live EP (and, later, live album) by American new wave band Devo. It was recorded during the Freedom of Choice tour on August 16, 1980, at the Fox Warfield Theatre in San Francisco.

== Background ==
DEV-O Live stems from a 16-track promotional album called Devo Live: Warner Bros. Music Show, recorded for broadcast on the King Biscuit Flower Hour. The broadcast was so popular that four songs ("Freedom of Choice Theme Song", "Whip It", "Be Stiff" and "Gates of Steel") were released as a promotional EP in November 1980, titled DEV-O Live, followed by the more widely available EP of the same name that added two more tracks ("Girl U Want" and "Planet Earth"). In 1999, Rhino Handmade re-released DEV-O Live on CD and included both the wide release EP version and the original promotional album in its entirety. Additionally, side breaks and the announcer's voice from the show were edited out. The Rhino edition was released in a plastic sleeve with a cover insert. It was later reissued in the 2008 Japanese CD box set This Is the Devo Box.

On November 29, 2019, Rhino issued an LP of the 16-track version as a Black Friday limited edition for Record Store Day, under the title Devo Live!.

Four additional songs—"Pink Pussycat" (played after "Secret Agent Man"), "Satisfaction" (played after "Blockhead"), "Freedom of Choice" and "Jocko Homo" (both played after "Gates of Steel")—appear on audience recordings of the show.

== Reception ==
Devo were given consistent radio support by Sydney-based noncommercial rock station 2JJ, one of the first rock stations outside America to play their recordings. This paid off, as in August 1981, they found commercial success in Australia when the EP spent three weeks at the top of the Australian singles charts. Later in the year, they travelled to Australia and appeared on the TV show Countdown.

== Track listing ==
All songs by Mark Mothersbaugh and Gerald V. Casale, unless otherwise indicated.

=== 1981 EP ===
Side one

1. "Freedom of Choice Theme Song" – 2:44
2. "Whip It" – 2:42
3. "Girl U Want" – 2:45

Side two

1. "Gates of Steel" (Casale, Mothersbaugh, Deborah Smith, Susan Schmidt) – 3:16
2. "Be Stiff" (Casale, Bob Lewis) – 2:49
3. "Planet Earth" (Casale) – 2:31

=== 1999 CD reissue ===
Original EP

1. "Freedom of Choice Theme Song" – 2:46
2. "Whip It" – 2:41
3. "Girl U Want" – 2:56
4. "Gates of Steel" (Casale, Mothersbaugh, Schmidt, Smith) – 3:17
5. "Be Stiff" (Casale, Lewis) – 2:50
6. "Planet Earth" (Casale) – 2:32

Promo LP

7. "Freedom of Choice Theme Song" – 2:46
8. "Whip It" – 2:41
9. "Snowball" – 2:42
10. "It's Not Right" (Mothersbaugh) – 2:20
11. "Girl U Want" – 2:56
12. "Planet Earth" (Casale) – 2:32
13. "S.I.B. (Swelling Itching Brain)" (Mothersbaugh) – 4:06
14. "Secret Agent Man" (Steve Barri, P. F. Sloan) – 3:17
15. "Blockhead" (Mothersbaugh, Bob Mothersbaugh) – 3:25
16. "Uncontrollable Urge" (Mothersbaugh) – 3:08
17. "Mongoloid" (Casale) – 2:50
18. "Be Stiff" (Casale, Lewis) – 2:50
19. "Gates of Steel" (Casale, Mothersbaugh, Schmidt, Smith) – 3:17
20. "Smart Patrol/Mr. DNA" (Casale/Casale, Mothersbaugh) – 4:08
21. "Gut Feeling/(Slap Your Mammy)" (Mothersbaugh, Mothersbaugh/Casale) – 4:12
22. "Come Back Jonee" – 3:19

== Personnel ==
Devo

- Mark Mothersbaugh – guitar, keyboards, vocals
- Gerald V. Casale – bass guitar, keyboards, vocals
- Bob Casale – guitar, keyboards, vocals
- Bob Mothersbaugh – guitar, vocals
- Alan Myers – drums

Technical

- Devo – producer, mixing
- Biff Dawes – live engineer
- Robert Kaminsky – live producer
- Ken Perry – mastering
- Lisa Barillier – front cover photography
- David Peters – back cover photography

== Charts ==
=== Weekly charts ===
| Chart (1981) | Peak position |
|---|---|
| Australian Singles (Kent Music Report) | 1 |
| Canada Top Albums/CDs (RPM) | 44 |
| New Zealand Albums (RMNZ) | 14 |
| US Billboard 200 | 50 |

=== Year-end charts ===
| Chart (1981) | Position |
|---|---|
| Australian Singles (Kent Music Report) | 5 |

== Sales ==
| Region | Certification | Certified units/sales |
|---|---|---|
| Australia | — | 115,000 |
