= He's My Number One =

Single by Christie Allen

from the album Magic Rhythm
- B-side: "Count Me Out"
- Released: January 1980
- Recorded: 1979
- Studio: Mayfair Studios, London
- Genre: Pop
- Length: 3:00
- Label: Mushroom
- Songwriter(s): Terry Britten, B. A. Robertson
- Producer(s): Terry Britten

Christie Allen singles chronology
"Goosebumps" (1979)	"He's My Number One" (1980)	"Magic Rhythm" (1980)

"He's My Number One" is a pop song written by Terry Britten and B. A. Robertson and recorded by Australian pop singer Christie Allen. The song was released in January 1980 as the fourth single from Allen's debut studio album, Magic Rhythm (1979). The song peaked at number 4 on the Kent Music Report in Australia.

At the 1979 Countdown awards, held on 13 April 1980, Allen performed "He's My Number One". Terry Britten won Best Recorded Songwriter for this song.

== Background ==
"He's My Number One" was released in January 1980 by English-born Australian pop singer, Christie Allen as the fourth single from her debut album, Magic Rhythm (1979), which was produced by English-Australian songwriter and guitarist Terry Britten. Allen had met Britten in Perth in 1977, while she fronted her family band, Pendulum. Britten co-wrote "He's My Number One" with Scottish musician B. A. Robertson. The song peaked at number 4 on the Kent Music Report singles chart in Australia. At the 1979 Countdown Music Awards, held on 13 April 1980, Allen performed "He's My Number One" and Terry Britten won Best Recorded Songwriter for it.

== Track listing ==
7" (K 7757)

- Side A – "He's My Number One" (Terry Britten, B. A. Robertson) – 3:00
- Side B – "Count Me Out" (Britten, B Welch) – 4:04

== Charts ==
=== Weekly charts ===
Chart (1980)	Peak position
Australian Kent Music Report	4

=== Year-end charts ===
Chart (1980)	Peak position
Australia (Kent Music Report)	18

=== Certifications ===
Region	Certification	Certified units/sales
Australia (ARIA)	Gold	50,000^{^}
^{^} Shipments figures based on certification alone.
