= Tired of Toein' the Line =

Single by Rocky Burnette

from the album The Son of Rock and Roll
- B-side: "Boogie Down in Mobile, Alabama" (North America) "Clowns From Outer Space" (international)
- Released: 1979 (UK); May 1980 (U.S.)
- Recorded: 1979
- Genre: New wave, rock and roll, rockabilly, country rock
- Length: 3:43
- Label: EMI America
- Songwriters: Rocky Burnette, Ron Coleman
- Producers: Bill House, Jim Seiter

Rocky Burnette singles chronology
"Tired of Toein' the Line" (1979)	"Fallin' in Love (Bein' Friends)" (1980)

"Tired of Toein' the Line" is a song by Rocky Burnette, who co-wrote it with Ron Coleman, former bass player of the Brothers Grim and the Everly Brothers.

== Background ==
The song was performed by Burnette, and contains lyrics detailing an imminent breakup from the point of view of a man who no longer wants to toe the line.

== Chart performance ==
After first appearing on the UK Official Singles Chart Top 75 in November 1979, the song became an international hit after its release in the United States in May 1980, and was Burnette's only hit single.

By peaking at number eight on the Billboard Hot 100, "Tired of Toein' the Line" tied "You're Sixteen", by Rocky's father Johnny Burnette, as the highest-charting Hot 100 single from a member of the Burnette family. The single was number one in Australia (for two weeks) in June 1980.

=== Weekly charts ===
Chart (1980–81)	Peak position
Argentina (CAPIF)	1
Australia (Kent Music Report)	1
Austria (Ö3 Austria Top 40)	9
Belgium (Ultratop 50 Flanders)	10
Brazil (ABPD)	8
Canada RPM Top Singles	4
Canada RPM Adult Contemporary	9
Denmark (Hitlisten)	5
Iceland (Dagblaðið Vísir)	5
Netherlands (Single Top 100)	14
Netherlands (Dutch Top 40)	12
New Zealand	3
South Africa (Springbok Radio)	3
Sweden (Sverigetopplistan)	3
UK	58
US Billboard Hot 100	8
US Billboard Adult Contemporary	39
US Cashbox Top 100	6
West Germany (GfK)	44

=== Year-end charts ===
Chart (1980)	Rank
Australia (Kent Music Report)	11
Canada	28
New Zealand	13
US Billboard Hot 100	48
US Cash Box	31

== Certifications ==
Region	Certification	Certified units/sales
Australia (ARIA)	Gold	50,000^{^}
Canada (Music Canada)	Gold	75,000^{^}
^{^} Shipments figures based on certification alone.

== See also ==
- 1980 in music
- List of 1980s one-hit wonders in the United States
- List of number-one singles in Australia during the 1980s
