= Space Invaders (Player One song) =

- 1979 Australian 7-inch sleeve

Single by Player 1

from the album Game Over
- B-side: "A Menacing Glow in the Sky"
- Released: 1979
- Genre: Space disco
- Length: 3:08
- Label: WEA
- Songwriters: Russell Dunlop, Bruce Brown
- Producers: Russell Dunlop, Bruce Brown

"Space Invaders" is a song by Australian songwriters Russell Dunlop and Bruce Brown, recording under the band name Player 1 (commonly stylised as Player [1]) in 1979. The song is based on the hugely successful 1978 video game Space Invaders. It was a novelty hit in Australia, peaking at No. 3 on the Kent Music Report charts, and ending up as the seventh best selling single in Australia for 1980. It spent 28 weeks on the Australian charts. The song approached Platinum status in Australia as of October 1980. The single was very popular in South Africa and received much airplay. It also reached No. 20 in the New Zealand charts.

== History ==
The arcade game of the same name, Space Invaders, was released by Japanese company Taito in 1978 and had become a global phenomenon by 1979. The Warner Music office in Sydney had its own arcade cabinet of the game, which prompted the idea of a song cashing in on the game's popularity. They took the project to Sydney producer duo Russell Dunlop and Bruce Brown, who took inspiration from the Space Invaders game to create the song's bassline. According to Brown: "We actually went out with a machine before we did the record and recorded all the sound effects of it and had a little fiddle around with it".

Dunlop and Brown also released an album as Player One, Game Over. Dunlop recalled: "We sat down and wrote a bunch of space songs, but instead of sticking to the concept of the hit, we wandered off into the 'clever' musical genre with fancy time signatures, radical chord progressions and so on. The reply came back for the States that this was intended for 13- to 14-year-olds: 'You've lost us.'"

The song was released internationally but failed to chart outside Australia. The single and album were released in the US under the band name Playback, which Brown and Dunlop had used for other projects, to avoid confusion with the US band Player. The US version of the album was titled Space Invaders.

== Legacy ==
"Space Invaders" was influential in the history of electronic dance music: a bootleg mashup called "On And On" used the original recording of "Space Invaders," and the bassline was re-used by Jesse Saunders for what is commonly held to be the first Chicago house record, also called "On and On" (1984).

== Charts ==
=== Weekly charts ===
Chart (1980)	Peak position
Australia (Kent Music Report)	3
New Zealand (Recorded Music NZ)	20

=== Year-end charts ===
Chart (1980)	Position
Australia (Kent Music Report)	7

== Certifications ==
Region	Certification	Certified units/sales
Australia (ARIA)	Platinum	100,000^{^}
^{^} Shipments figures based on certification alone.
