= Christie Allen =

English-born Australian singer

Background information
- Born: June Dorothy Allen; 24 July 1954; Romford, England
- Origin: Perth, Western Australia
- Died: 12 August 2008 (aged 54) Bunbury, Western Australia
- Genres: Pop, disco, country
- Occupation: Singer
- Instrument: Vocals
- Years active: 1962–1998
- Label: Mushroom
- Formerly of: Pendulum

Christie Allen (born June Dorothy Allen; 24 July 1954 – 12 August 2008) was an English-born Australian pop singer who had a successful career in Australia. Her top four hits on the Australian Kent Music Report Singles Chart were "Goosebumps" (October 1979) and "He's My Number One" (February 1980). Allen was voted the Most Popular Female Performer at the TV Week / Countdown Music Awards for 1979 and 1980. At the 1979 awards, "Goosebumps" also won the Best Songwriter award for Terry Britten. Allen died on 12 August 2008 of pancreatic cancer, aged 54.

== Biography ==
Christie Allen was born June Dorothy Allen on 24 July 1954 in Romford, England, to Keith Frederick Allen (1932–2004) and Vera Helen née Kettle (1932–2001). Allen has three brothers, Keith, Stephen and Mark. At the age of eight years, Allen sang "My Johnny's Gone Away" in a talent quest. In 1965, the Allen family migrated to Australia and settled in Perth. Allen and her brothers formed a band, Pendulum, where she provided lead vocals.

Whilst performing with Pendulum, Allen contacted UK-born Terry Britten, a songwriter and record producer and was the lead guitarist of Australian rock group, the Twilights, Britten had worked with Cliff Richard for whom he co-wrote "Devil Woman" in 1976 with Kristine Holmes. By the mid 1970s, Britten was living in Australia and was impressed by Allen's vocal ability and bubbly personality and began songwriting for her. In 1978, Allen signed a recording contract with Mushroom Records and in September 1978 she released her debut single "You Know That I Love You", which reached the top 100 on the Australian Kent Music Report Singles Chart, and attracted some national radio airplay and positive reviews.

Her next three singles from her debut album, Magic Rhythm (November 1979), were top 20 hits; "Falling in Love with Only You" reached No. 20 in April 1979 while her next two singles were strongly influenced by the popular disco style of music at the time."Goosebumps", which reached No. 3 in September 1979, and "He's My Number One", which peaked at No. 4 in February 1980. "Goosebumps" achieved sales of more than 60,000.

Allen toured Australia backed by The Hot Band, which was composed of Max Chazan on guitar (Rubes), Greg Cook on guitar (ex-Cam-Pact, the Mixtures, Ram Band, Mondo Rock), Bruce Haymes on organ (Rubes, Richard Clapton Band), Michael Hegerty on bass guitar (Richard Clapton Band), and Rick Puchala on drums (Richard Clapton Band); and later Yuri Worontschak on keyboards: Yamaha CP70B and Minimoog (ex Spitfire).

Allen was voted the 'Most Popular Female Performer' at the TV Week / Countdown Music Awards for 1979 and 1980. At the 1979 awards ceremony on 13 April 1980, Allen performed, "He's My Number One". At the same ceremony, Britten won the 'Best Songwriter' award for "He's My Number One". Allen won the 1980 award for 'Most Popular Female Performer', broadcast on 22 March 1981.

Christie Allen gave Countdown something it had been lacking – a local female artist to appeal to the teeny boppers. It is sometimes not appreciated just how successful Christie was.

— Dave Warner, 25 Years of Mushroom Records

Besides performing, Allen also appeared on Countdown as a guest host in November 1979 with Russell Hitchcock (Air Supply), and in April 1980 with Molly Meldrum. In the early 1980s Allen supplied the voice-over and sang the jingle 'Come Tarino with Me' for Tarino orange soft drink commercials.

In August 1980, Allen released the single "Baby Get Away", which was followed by her second and final studio album Detour and a further single, "Switchboard", in November 1980. Due to professional pressures and personal troubles, Allen abandoned promotional duties for Detour and took a three and a half month long break to recuperate. She returned with the third and final single from Detour, "Don't Put Out the Flame", in March 1981, but subsequently retired from the music industry. She later attributed the end of her career to escaping her abusive partner in 1980, telling The Age in 1998, "I missed singing so terribly. That was my life, and through no fault of my own, it [was] changed. I guess I'm rather bitter towards him for doing that." By 1990, Allen had re-emerged in the Kalgoorlie area as one half of the musical duo Christie and Steve.

In the 1990s, Allen was performing as a vocalist with country music bands. In October 1998, Michael Gudinski appealed on national radio for information on Allen's whereabouts—Gudinski wanted her to perform at a televised tribute concert for the 25th anniversary of his company, Mushroom Records. On 14 November 1998, Allen sang "Goosebumps" before a huge crowd at the Melbourne Cricket Ground—the performance was released on the VHS album, Mushroom 25 Live (December 1998).

In 2006, Gudinski asked Allen to participate in the Countdown Spectacular tour; however, due to ill health, she declined. In March 2008, Allen was diagnosed with pancreatic cancer and died at her home in rural Western Australia on 12 August 2008, aged 54.

=== Personal life ===
Allen had an older brother, Keith, and two younger brothers, Stephen and Mark. With all three brothers, she formed a Perth-based group, Pendulum.

In the 1970s, Allen lived with her first husband, Frank Rechichi in Karratha, Western Australia. The couple later separated and the divorce was finalised in 1981. She became engaged to her boyfriend Jeff Risk in 1980, but this was broken off and Allen and her second husband, Angelo, married in 1981. They subsequently had a daughter, Christaleah. By the 1990s, Allen and her domestic partner Mark had a daughter. In October 1998, Allen and Mark married.

== Discography ==
=== Albums ===
List of studio albums, with selected chart positions
Title	Details	Peak chart positions	Certifications
Title	Details	AUS	Certifications
Magic Rhythm	Released: November 1979; Label: Mushroom Records (L37075)	59	BPI: Gold
Detour	Released: November 1980; Label: Mushroom Records (L37489)	96	

=== Singles ===
Title	Year	Peak chart positions		Certification	Album
Title	Year	AUS	NZ	Certification	Album
"You Know That I Love You"	1978	67	–		Magic Rhythm
"Falling in Love with Only You"	1979	20	–		Magic Rhythm
"Goosebumps"	1979	3	37	ARIA: Gold	Magic Rhythm
"He's My Number One"	1980	4	–	ARIA: Gold	Magic Rhythm
"Magic Rhythm"	1980	38	–		Magic Rhythm
"Baby Get Away"	1980	38	–		Detour
"Switchboard"	1980	–	–		Detour
"Don't Put Out the Flame"	1981	68	–		Detour
"—" denotes releases that did not chart or were not released.

== Award and nominations ==
=== TV Week / Countdown Awards ===
Countdown was an Australian pop music TV series on national broadcaster ABC-TV from 1974 to 1987, it presented music awards from 1979 to 1987, initially in conjunction with magazine TV Week. The TV Week / Countdown Awards were a combination of popular-voted and peer-voted awards.

Year	Nominee / work	Award	Result
1979	herself	Best New Talent	Nominated
1979	herself	Most Popular Female Performer	Won
1979	"Goosebumps"	Most Popular Single	Won
1979	Terry Britten for "He's My Number One" by Christie Allen	Best Recorded Songwriter	Won
1980	herself	Most Popular Female Performer	Nominated
