= Rocky Burnette =

American musician (born 1953)

- Born: Jonathan Burnette; June 12, 1953 (age 73); Memphis, Tennessee, U.S.
- Genres: Rock and roll, rockabilly
- Occupations: Singer, musician
- Instruments: Vocals, guitar
- Years active: 1979–present
- Label: EMI America

Jonathan "Rocky" Burnette (born June 12, 1953) is an American singer and musician and the son of the rockabilly and pop singer Johnny Burnette. Rocky is best known for his 1980 hit single "Tired of Toein' the Line" which he co-wrote with Ron Coleman, who formerly wrote, recorded and performed with the Brothers Grim and the Everly Brothers.

== Career ==
Rocky Burnette was born in Memphis, Tennessee, and became part of the early 1980s revival of the rockabilly style. He released his first album, The Son of Rock and Roll (#53 Billboard Hot 200), on EMI America in 1979. In the summer of 1980, his single "Tired of Toein' the Line" became a No. 8 pop hit in the United States. The song was also popular internationally, becoming a No. 1 hit in Australia and peaking at No. 3 in South Africa; it reached No. 58 in the UK. EMI America's financial problems interfered with promotion efforts for the follow-up singles (several of which became hits in other countries), and Burnette's second album, Heart Stopper (The Goods Records, 1982), was not successful.

In 1983, Burnette toured Europe with the final version of his deceased father's Rock and Roll Trio. He also used the band on his next album, Get Hot or Go Home! on KYD Records. It also sold poorly and KYD dropped Burnette and the Trio rather than release a follow-up.

Burnette worked with Rosie Flores and Dwight Twilley in the mid-1990s, and also contributed vocals and the original "Trouble Is I'm in Love With You" to Paul Burlison's 1997 Train Kept A-Rollin'. In 1996, Burnette released Tear It Up on Core Records.

Burnette co-wrote the European hit "You Got Away With Love" for Percy Sledge in 1997 which was produced by Saul Davis & Barry Goldberg. He continues to tour internationally at a number of rockabilly shows.

Backed by Barry Goldberg and Mickey Raphael, he recorded "Mystery Train" for the Carla Olson-produced Americana Railroad compilation album released in 2021.

== Discography ==
- The Son Of Rock And Roll (EMI America, 1979)
- Heart Stopper (The Goods Records, 1982)
- Get Hot Or Go Home! (KYD, 1983)
- Tear It Up (Core, 1996)
- Hip Shakin' Baby: A Tribute To Johnny & Dorsey Burnette – with Darrel Higham & The Enforcers (Rockstar, 2002)
- Wampus Cat (El Toro, 2007)
- Rock Solid (Sunset Blvd Records, 2019)

== See also ==
- List of 1980s one-hit wonders in the United States
