= Crown Court (TV series) =

British television drama series (1972–1984)

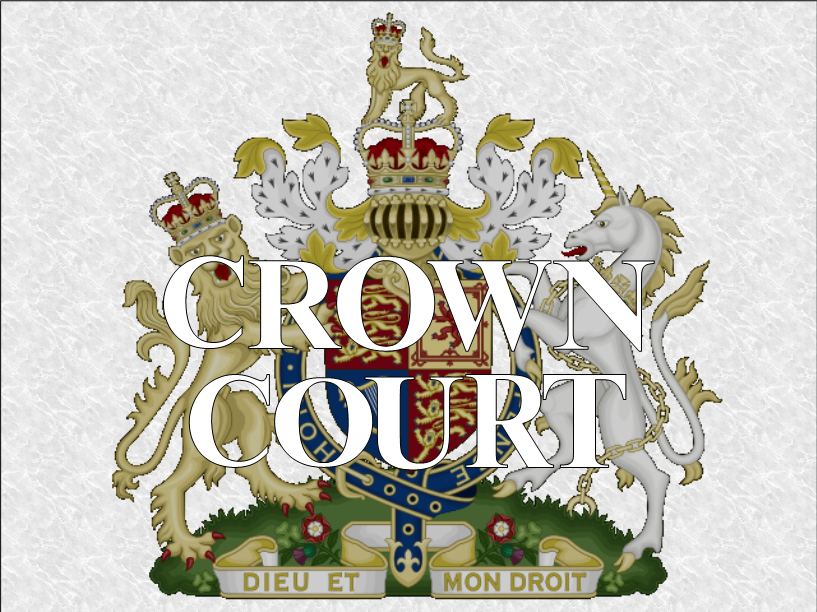
- Reconstruction of the title card of later series of Crown Court
- Genre: Court show; Legal drama
- Starring: John Barron; William Mervyn; John Alkin; Bernard Gallagher; Dorothy Vernon; Peter Wheeler; T. P. McKenna
- Narrated by: Peter Wheeler
- Opening theme: "Sinfonietta" by Janáček, 4th movement
- Ending theme: "Distant Hills" by the Simon Park Orchestra, composed by Peter Reno
- Country of origin: United Kingdom
- Original language: English
- No. of series: 11
- No. of episodes: 879

Production
- Running time: 23 minutes
- Production company: Granada TV

Original release
- Network: ITV
- Release: 18 October 1972 – 29 March 1984

Crown Court is a British television courtroom drama series produced by Granada Television for the ITV network. It ran from 1972, when the Crown Court system replaced assize courts and quarter sessions in the legal system of England and Wales, to 1984. It was transmitted in the early afternoon.

== Format ==
A court case in the crown court of the fictional town of Fulchester (a name later adopted by Viz) would typically be played out over three afternoons in 25-minute episodes. The most frequent format was for the prosecution case to be presented in the first two episodes and the defence in the third, although there were some later, brief variations.

Unlike some other legal dramas, the cases in Crown Court were presented from a relatively neutral point of view and the action was confined to the courtroom itself, with occasional brief glimpses of waiting areas outside the courtroom. Although those involved in the case were actors, the jury was made up of members of the general public from the immediate Granada Television franchise area taken from the electoral register and eligible for real jury service: it was this jury alone, which decided the verdict. Indeed, contemporary production publicity stated that, for almost all of the scripts, two endings were written and rehearsed to cope with the jury's independent decision, which was delivered for the first time, as in a real court case, while the programme's recording progressed. However, the course of some cases would lead to the jury being directed to return 'not guilty' verdicts.

After an unscreened pilot, the first story to be shown was Lieberman v Savage (18 to 20 October 1972). Unusually this was a civil case, whereas the vast majority of subsequent instalments featured criminal trials, with only occasional civil cases such as libel, insurance or copyright claims.

== Variations ==
There were some subtle changes in presentation in the early years. In the first year or so stories often opened with photographs of key figures or incidents around the alleged offence over which the court reporter would narrate the background to the case. In other instances there were filmed sequences but these were without dialogue and rarely showed the alleged offence. They were phased out a little earlier than the photos. Thereafter the action would immediately start in the courtroom.

Although the standard format was stories of three 25-minute episodes there were occasional variations. In 1973 there was one story of just one episode and another comprising two. In July and August 1975 a number of stories were presented in single extended episodes at 8.15pm on Saturdays—a prime time scheduling. They occupied a slot of 75 minutes (just over one hour for the story on-screen after adverts are taken into account.) This was a brief experiment and the programme reverted to its standard format and daytime location thereafter.

The series was occasionally humorous and was even capable of self-parody. On 27 December 1973 a 52-minute self-contained episode Murder Most Foul had a distinctly light-hearted theme and even featured special Christmas-style titles and music. The 1977 story An Upward Fall, written by absurdist playwright N. F. Simpson, was played as a comedy. This bizarre case featured an old people's home built atop a 3,000-foot cliff; its only lavatories were located at the foot of the cliff. Other stories were deadly serious, such as the story Treason in which a White Congolese man is found guilty by the jury and sentenced to death for treason by the court (a crime formally still punishable by execution under British law at that time.)

== Untransmitted stories ==
An untransmitted pilot called Doctor's Neglect? was eventually broadcast as part of a repeat run on satellite channel Legal TV over 30 years later, and again on Talking Pictures TV commencing Monday 9 January 2023. Like the first transmitted episode, this was a civil case—in this instance relating to negligence. The pilot story differs in style in some important respects. In particular, it features informal conversations between the barristers in their quarters as well as them giving advice to clients. Neither aspect figured in episodes from the broadcast run itself, which strictly confined legal discussions to the courtroom. The episode also has no jury; the case is decided by a judge alone. David Ashford, a regular in the programme's early stages as barrister Charles Lotterby, plays a different barrister called Derek Jones. Actors Ernest Hare and David Neal make their only appearances, as a judge and barrister respectively.

This was not the only example of untransmitted stories. In February 1974 the scheduled Traffic Warden's Daughter was replaced by The Getaway. In 1979 Heart To Heart, intended for transmission from 15 to 17 April, was replaced by a repeat of A Ladies' Man (originally broadcast 15–17 February 1977). Although neither story was ever broadcast on terrestrial TV they both received airings on Legal TV and have since been released on DVD.

Rarer still is a story titled A Case For Justice – A Party to Crime, a three-part instalment produced after a couple of two-parters in 1981. Written by Michael Wilcox and featuring actors David Langton, Robin Kermode and Barry Stanton. For unknown reasons, this was never screened on ITV nor on Legal TV or on any other known channel and has not been released on DVD either.

== Contributors ==
Regular actors included William Mervyn, John Barron, John Woodnutt, John Horsley, Edward Jewesbury, Richard Warner, Richard Caldicot, Basil Dignam, Laurence Hardy, Alan Rowe, André Morell, Frank Middlemass, Thorley Walters, John Moffatt and Basil Henson as judges, John Alkin, David Ashford, Keith Barron, Jonathan Elsom, Bernard Gallagher, Peter Jeffrey, Peter Copley, Charles Keating, Maureen Lipman, T. P. McKenna, Dorothy Vernon, Richard Wilson, William Simons and Robert Stephens were among the most common faces as barristers.

Other (then or subsequently) famous names to appear on the show included Eleanor Bron, Peter Capaldi, Warren Clarke, Tom Conti, Brian Cox, Honey Bane, Philip Bond, Liz Dawn, Michael Elphick, Sheila Fearn, Colin Firth, Gregor Fisher, Brenda Fricker, Derek Griffiths, Nigel Havers, Ian Hendry, Joan Hickson, Bernard Hill, Ben Kingsley, John Le Mesurier, Ian Marter, Mark McManus, Vivien Merchant, Mary Miller, Geraldine Newman, Bill Nighy, Judy Parfitt, Robert Powell, Patricia Routledge, Peter Sallis, Anthony Sharp, Michael Sheard, Barbara Shelley, Juliet Stevenson, Patrick Troughton, Mary Wimbush and Mark Wing-Davey.

Writers included Ian Curteis, David Fisher, Peter Wildeblood, John Godber, Ngaio Marsh and Jeremy Sandford.

== Recurring characters ==
- Peter Wheeler as narrator and court reporter
- David Ashford as Charles Lotterby
- William Mervyn as The Hon. Mr. Justice Campbell
- Dorothy Vernon as Helen Tate
- Bernard Gallagher as Jonathan Fry QC
- John Alkin as barrister Barry Deeley
- John Barron as Mr. Justice Mitchenor
- Richard Wilson as Jeremy Parsons QC
- Charles Keating as James Elliot QC
- Edward Jewesbury as The Hon. Mr. Justice Bragge
- Jonathan Elsom as Marcus Golding QC
- Mervyn Johns as Arthur Charles Parfitt and Edward Lumsden
- Richard Warner as The Hon. Mr. Justice Waddington
- John Horsley as Justice Mowbray
- Frank Middlemass as The Hon. Mr. Justice Craig
- Basil Dignam as Mr. Justice Poynter
- Gareth Forwood as Doctor Park
- Laurence Hardy as Mr. Justice Stoddard
- Basil Henson as Justice Yearly
- T. P. McKenna as Patrick Canty QC
- Michael Elphick as Neville Griffiths QC
- Peter Jeffrey as Peter Edgar QC
- Keith Barron as Timothy Dorney
- Joseph Berry as court usher
- William Simons as Martin O'Connor QC
- Mark McManus as Harry Bryant
- Reg Lye as Jack Smith / Tom Bernard
- Richard Colson as the Clerk of the Court

== Production and archive details ==
- In an effort to make the replica courtroom appear as realistic as possible to the 'jury', each episode was recorded as 'live', with retakes kept to an absolute minimum. The cameras (which at the time of production were large and cumbersome and required an operator to be present) were placed at strategic points and largely kept static, thus reducing any possible distraction caused by production requirements.
- The jury were given only 30 minutes to reach their verdict.
- Episodes included a brief voice-over narration by Peter Wheeler (or occasionally others) at the beginning either to introduce the context of the case (for the first episode of a story) or to summarise the events of the case so far (for the later episodes of a story).
- All episodes of Crown Court exist in PAL colour as originally transmitted, including the postponed Heart to Heart.

== Repeats and commercial availability ==
- Legal TV and UK Satellite channel Red TV showed episodes from the series from 2006 until December 2008 when Red TV rebranded itself from an entertainment channel to a music channel.
- Satellite channel Granada Plus repeated a number of episodes, mostly from series one and two, in the late-1990s.
- Satellite channel Sky Soap repeated the first 11 episodes from 1972 in a weekday lunchtime slot in April 1999.
- Despite the almost full archive of broadcast quality episodes the series has never been repeated on ITV since the mid 1980s.
- The story The Eleventh Commandment was included as an extra on Network DVD's 2007 release of The Sandbaggers Series 3 as it features the series' lead actor Roy Marsden.
- Similarly, the Network DVD release of The XYY Man included the Crown Court story An Evil Influence (15–17 October 1975) as an extra feature; Stephen Yardley, star of The XYY Man, plays the role of Dr Thanet.
- The Network DVD release of Strangers includes the 1977 story A Place to Stay, featuring Don Henderson.
- Eight volumes of stories have been released by Network DVD. These are in production order and currently include all those broadcast from the programme's inception to July 1974. The two instalments not broadcast by ITV are also included.
- Talking Pictures TV began airing three episodes (one case) a week, beginning in January 2023, and starting with the pilot "Doctor's Neglect?". The three episodes were originally aired on three separate days of the week, but were later shown contiguously on a single day.

== Episodes ==
The episodes below are listed in the order available on TV Guide.

=== Series 1 ===
No. in series	Case	Part 1 air date	Part 2 air date	Part 3 air date
1	"Lieberman v Savage"	18 October 1972	19 October 1972	20 October 1972
2	"Lieberman v Savage"	18 October 1972	19 October 1972	20 October 1972
3	"Lieberman v Savage"	18 October 1972	19 October 1972	20 October 1972
4	"R. v Lord"	25 October 1972	26 October 1972	27 October 1972
5	"R. v Lord"	25 October 1972	26 October 1972	27 October 1972
6	"R. v Lord"	25 October 1972	26 October 1972	27 October 1972
7	"R. v Bryant"	1 November 1972	2 November 1972	3 November 1972
8	"R. v Bryant"	1 November 1972	2 November 1972	3 November 1972
9	"R. v Bryant"	1 November 1972	2 November 1972	3 November 1972
10	"Euthanasia: R. v Webb"	8 November 1972	9 November 1972	10 November 1972
11	"Euthanasia: R. v Webb"	8 November 1972	9 November 1972	10 November 1972
12	"Euthanasia: R. v Webb"	8 November 1972	9 November 1972	10 November 1972
13	"R. v Vennings and Vennings"	15 November 1972	16 November 1972	17 November 1972
14	"R. v Vennings and Vennings"	15 November 1972	16 November 1972	17 November 1972
15	"R. v Vennings and Vennings"	15 November 1972	16 November 1972	17 November 1972
16	"The Eleventh Commandment: R. v Mitchell and Clayton"	22 November 1972	23 November 1972	24 November 1972
17	"The Eleventh Commandment: R. v Mitchell and Clayton"	22 November 1972	23 November 1972	24 November 1972
18	"The Eleventh Commandment: R. v Mitchell and Clayton"	22 November 1972	23 November 1972	24 November 1972
19	"A Genial Man: R. v Bolton"	29 November 1972	30 November 1972	1 December 1972
20	"A Genial Man: R. v Bolton"	29 November 1972	30 November 1972	1 December 1972
21	"A Genial Man: R. v Bolton"	29 November 1972	30 November 1972	1 December 1972
22	"Espionage: R. v Terson"	6 December 1972	7 December 1972	8 December 1972
23	"Espionage: R. v Terson"	6 December 1972	7 December 1972	8 December 1972
24	"Espionage: R. v Terson"	6 December 1972	7 December 1972	8 December 1972
25	"Conspiracy: R. v Luckhurst and Sawyer"	13 December 1972	14 December 1972	15 December 1972
26	"Conspiracy: R. v Luckhurst and Sawyer"	13 December 1972	14 December 1972	15 December 1972
27	"Conspiracy: R. v Luckhurst and Sawyer"	13 December 1972	14 December 1972	15 December 1972
28	"Who is Benedetto Trovato? R. v Starkie"	20 December 1972	21 December 1972	22 December 1972
29	"Who is Benedetto Trovato? R. v Starkie"	20 December 1972	21 December 1972	22 December 1972
30	"Who is Benedetto Trovato? R. v Starkie"	20 December 1972	21 December 1972	22 December 1972
31	"Criminal Libel: R. v Maitland"	27 December 1972	28 December 1972	29 December 1972
32	"Criminal Libel: R. v Maitland"	27 December 1972	28 December 1972	29 December 1972
33	"Criminal Libel: R. v Maitland"	27 December 1972	28 December 1972	29 December 1972
34	"The Medium: R. v Purbeck"	TBA	TBA	TBA
35	"The Medium: R. v Purbeck"	TBA	TBA	TBA
36	"The Medium: R. v Purbeck"	TBA	TBA	TBA

=== Series 2 ===
No. in series	Case	Part 1 air date	Part 2 air date	Part 3 air date
1	"Whatever Happened to George Robins? R. v Barnes"	3 January 1973	4 January 1973	5 January 1973
2	"Whatever Happened to George Robins? R. v Barnes"	3 January 1973	4 January 1973	5 January 1973
3	"Whatever Happened to George Robins? R. v Barnes"	3 January 1973	4 January 1973	5 January 1973
4	"Blackmail: R. v Brewer and Brewer"	10 January 1973	11 January 1973	12 January 1973
5	"Blackmail: R. v Brewer and Brewer"	10 January 1973	11 January 1973	12 January 1973
6	"Blackmail: R. v Brewer and Brewer"	10 January 1973	11 January 1973	12 January 1973
7	"Sunset of Arms: Fitton v Pusey"	17 January 1973	18 January 1973	19 January 1973
8	"Sunset of Arms: Fitton v Pusey"	17 January 1973	18 January 1973	19 January 1973
9	"Sunset of Arms: Fitton v Pusey"	17 January 1973	18 January 1973	19 January 1973
10	"Persimmons and Dishwashers: R. v Curl and Curl"	24 January 1973	25 January 1973	26 January 1973
11	"Persimmons and Dishwashers: R. v Curl and Curl"	24 January 1973	25 January 1973	26 January 1973
12	"Persimmons and Dishwashers: R. v Curl and Curl"	24 January 1973	25 January 1973	26 January 1973
13	"A Public Mischief: R. v Baker and Crawley"	31 January 1973	1 February 1973	2 February 1973
14	"A Public Mischief: R. v Baker and Crawley"	31 January 1973	1 February 1973	2 February 1973
15	"A Public Mischief: R. v Baker and Crawley"	31 January 1973	1 February 1973	2 February 1973
16	"Portrait of an Artist: Kingsley v Messiter"	7 February 1973	8 February 1973	9 February 1973
17	"Portrait of an Artist: Kingsley v Messiter"	7 February 1973	8 February 1973	9 February 1973
18	"Portrait of an Artist: Kingsley v Messiter"	7 February 1973	8 February 1973	9 February 1973
19	"A Crime in Prison: R. v Ager and Lanigan"	14 February 1973	15 February 1973	16 February 1973
20	"A Crime in Prison: R. v Ager and Lanigan"	14 February 1973	15 February 1973	16 February 1973
21	"A Crime in Prison: R. v Ager and Lanigan"	14 February 1973	15 February 1973	16 February 1973
22	"Infanticide or Murder? R. v Collins"	21 February 1973	22 February 1973	23 February 1973
23	"Infanticide or Murder? R. v Collins"	21 February 1973	22 February 1973	23 February 1973
24	"Infanticide or Murder? R. v Collins"	21 February 1973	22 February 1973	23 February 1973
25	"Act of Vengeance: R. v Collings"	28 February 1973	1 March 1973	2 March 1973
26	"Act of Vengeance: R. v Collings"	28 February 1973	1 March 1973	2 March 1973
27	"Act of Vengeance: R. v Collings"	28 February 1973	1 March 1973	2 March 1973
28	"Freak-Out: R. v Marlow"	7 March 1973	8 March 1973	9 March 1973
29	"Freak-Out: R. v Marlow"	7 March 1973	8 March 1973	9 March 1973
30	"Freak-Out: R. v Marlow"	7 March 1973	8 March 1973	9 March 1973
31	"The Mugging of Arthur Simmons: R. v Dempsey and Langham"	14 March 1973	15 March 1973	16 March 1973
32	"The Mugging of Arthur Simmons: R. v Dempsey and Langham"	14 March 1973	15 March 1973	16 March 1973
33	"The Mugging of Arthur Simmons: R. v Dempsey and Langham"	14 March 1973	15 March 1973	16 March 1973
34	"Love Thy Neighbour: R. v Thornton and Thornton"	21 March 1973	22 March 1973	23 March 1973
35	"Love Thy Neighbour: R. v Thornton and Thornton"	21 March 1973	22 March 1973	23 March 1973
36	"Love Thy Neighbour: R. v Thornton and Thornton"	21 March 1973	22 March 1973	23 March 1973
37	"The Death of Dracula: R. v Mattson"	28 March 1973	29 March 1973	30 March 1973
38	"The Death of Dracula: R. v Mattson"	28 March 1973	29 March 1973	30 March 1973
39	"The Death of Dracula: R. v Mattson"	28 March 1973	29 March 1973	30 March 1973
40	"Wise Child: R. v Lapointe"	4 April 1973	5 April 1973	6 April 1973
41	"Wise Child: R. v Lapointe"	4 April 1973	5 April 1973	6 April 1973
42	"Wise Child: R. v Lapointe"	4 April 1973	5 April 1973	6 April 1973
43	"Beware of the Dog: R. v Page"	11 April 1973	12 April 1973	13 April 1973
44	"Beware of the Dog: R. v Page"	11 April 1973	12 April 1973	13 April 1973
45	"Beware of the Dog: R. v Page"	11 April 1973	12 April 1973	13 April 1973
46	"Theft by Necessity: R. v Burton"	18 April 1973	-	-
47	"The Gilded Cage: R. v Scard"	19 April 1973	20 April 1973	-
48	"The Gilded Cage: R. v Scard"	19 April 1973	20 April 1973	-
49	"Credibility Gap: Stevens v Porton"	25 April 1973	26 April 1973	27 April 1973
50	"Credibility Gap: Stevens v Porton"	25 April 1973	26 April 1973	27 April 1973
51	"Credibility Gap: Stevens v Porton"	25 April 1973	26 April 1973	27 April 1973
52	"The Long Haired Leftie: R. v Dowd"	2 May 1973	3 May 1973	4 May 1973
53	"The Long Haired Leftie: R. v Dowd"	2 May 1973	3 May 1973	4 May 1973
54	"The Long Haired Leftie: R. v Dowd"	2 May 1973	3 May 1973	4 May 1973
55	"Intent to Kill: R. v Duffy"	9 May 1973	10 May 1973	11 May 1973
56	"Intent to Kill: R. v Duffy"	9 May 1973	10 May 1973	11 May 1973
57	"Intent to Kill: R. v Duffy"	9 May 1973	10 May 1973	11 May 1973
58	"There Was a Little Girl: R. v Grey"	16 May 1973	17 May 1973	18 May 1973
59	"There Was a Little Girl: R. v Grey"	16 May 1973	17 May 1973	18 May 1973
60	"There Was a Little Girl: R. v Grey"	16 May 1973	17 May 1973	18 May 1973
61	"A View to Matrimony: R. v McNeill"	23 May 1973	24 May 1973	25 May 1973
62	"A View to Matrimony: R. v McNeill"	23 May 1973	24 May 1973	25 May 1973
63	"A View to Matrimony: R. v McNeill"	23 May 1973	24 May 1973	25 May 1973
64	"Settling a Score: R. v Bates"	30 May 1973	31 May 1973	1 June 1973
65	"Settling a Score: R. v Bates"	30 May 1973	31 May 1973	1 June 1973
66	"Settling a Score: R. v Bates"	30 May 1973	31 May 1973	1 June 1973
67	"To Catch a Thief: R. v Halsey"	6 June 1973	7 June 1973	8 June 1973
68	"To Catch a Thief: R. v Halsey"	6 June 1973	7 June 1973	8 June 1973
69	"To Catch a Thief: R. v Halsey"	6 June 1973	7 June 1973	8 June 1973
70	"Patch's Patch: R. v Patch"	13 June 1973	14 June 1973	15 June 1973
71	"Patch's Patch: R. v Patch"	13 June 1973	14 June 1973	15 June 1973
72	"Patch's Patch: R. v Patch"	13 June 1973	14 June 1973	15 June 1973
73	"Who Was Kate Greer? R. v Archer"	20 June 1973	21 June 1973	22 June 1973
74	"Who Was Kate Greer? R. v Archer"	20 June 1973	21 June 1973	22 June 1973
75	"Who Was Kate Greer? R. v Archer"	20 June 1973	21 June 1973	22 June 1973
76	"A Right to Life: Abbs v Richards"	27 June 1973	28 June 1973	29 June 1973
77	"A Right to Life: Abbs v Richards"	27 June 1973	28 June 1973	29 June 1973
78	"A Right to Life: Abbs v Richards"	27 June 1973	28 June 1973	29 June 1973
79	"The Inner Circle: Heywood v Blower"	4 July 1973	5 July 1973	6 July 1973
80	"The Inner Circle: Heywood v Blower"	4 July 1973	5 July 1973	6 July 1973
81	"The Inner Circle: Heywood v Blower"	4 July 1973	5 July 1973	6 July 1973
82	"The Black Poplar: R. v Tressman"	11 July 1973	12 July 1973	13 July 1973
83	"The Black Poplar: R. v Tressman"	11 July 1973	12 July 1973	13 July 1973
84	"The Black Poplar: R. v Tressman"	11 July 1973	12 July 1973	13 July 1973
85	"The Open Invitation: R. v Sellars"	18 July 1973	19 July 1973	20 July 1973
86	"The Open Invitation: R. v Sellars"	18 July 1973	19 July 1973	20 July 1973
87	"The Open Invitation: R. v Sellars"	18 July 1973	19 July 1973	20 July 1973
88	"Beggar on Horseback: R. v Erringburn"	25 July 1973	26 July 1973	27 July 1973
89	"Beggar on Horseback: R. v Erringburn"	25 July 1973	26 July 1973	27 July 1973
90	"Beggar on Horseback: R. v Erringburn"	25 July 1973	26 July 1973	27 July 1973
91	"The Night for Country Dancing: R. v Airey"	1 August 1973	2 August 1973	3 August 1973
92	"The Night for Country Dancing: R. v Airey"	1 August 1973	2 August 1973	3 August 1973
93	"The Night for Country Dancing: R. v Airey"	1 August 1973	2 August 1973	3 August 1973
94	"Mrs. Moresby's Scrapbook: R. v Moresby"	8 August 1973	9 August 1973	10 August 1973
95	"Mrs. Moresby's Scrapbook: R. v Moresby"	8 August 1973	9 August 1973	10 August 1973
96	"Mrs. Moresby's Scrapbook: R. v Moresby"	8 August 1973	9 August 1973	10 August 1973
97	"My Old Man's a Dustman: R. v Cousins and Cousins and Mayes"	15 August 1973	16 August 1973	17 August 1973
98	"My Old Man's a Dustman: R. v Cousins and Cousins and Mayes"	15 August 1973	16 August 1973	17 August 1973
99	"My Old Man's a Dustman: R. v Cousins and Cousins and Mayes"	15 August 1973	16 August 1973	17 August 1973
100	"The Judgement of Solomon: R. v Kamuny and Kamuny"	22 August 1973	23 August 1973	24 August 1973
101	"The Judgement of Solomon: R. v Kamuny and Kamuny"	22 August 1973	23 August 1973	24 August 1973
102	"The Judgement of Solomon: R. v Kamuny and Kamuny"	22 August 1973	23 August 1973	24 August 1973
103	"Destruct, Destruct ... R. v Ainsworth"	29 August 1973	30 August 1973	1 September 1973
104	"Destruct, Destruct ... R. v Ainsworth"	29 August 1973	30 August 1973	1 September 1973
105	"Destruct, Destruct ... R. v Ainsworth"	29 August 1973	30 August 1973	1 September 1973
106	"Public Lives: R. v Williams and Pastor"	5 September 1973	6 September 1973	7 September 1973
107	"Public Lives: R. v Williams and Pastor"	5 September 1973	6 September 1973	7 September 1973
108	"Public Lives: R. v Williams and Pastor"	5 September 1973	6 September 1973	7 September 1973
109	"The Thunderbolts: Easter v Goss"	12 September 1973	13 September 1973	14 September 1973
110	"The Thunderbolts: Easter v Goss"	12 September 1973	13 September 1973	14 September 1973
111	"The Thunderbolts: Easter v Goss"	12 September 1973	13 September 1973	14 September 1973
112	"Treason: R. v Clement"	19 September 1973	20 September 1973	21 September 1973
113	"Treason: R. v Clement"	19 September 1973	20 September 1973	21 September 1973
114	"Treason: R. v Clement"	19 September 1973	20 September 1973	21 September 1973
115	"A Stab in the Front: R. v Blandford"	26 September 1973	27 September 1973	28 September 1973
116	"A Stab in the Front: R. v Blandford"	26 September 1973	27 September 1973	28 September 1973
117	"A Stab in the Front: R. v Blandford"	26 September 1973	27 September 1973	28 September 1973
118	"Just Good Friends: R. v Beaumont"	10 October 1973	11 October 1973	12 October 1973
119	"Just Good Friends: R. v Beaumont"	10 October 1973	11 October 1973	12 October 1973
120	"Just Good Friends: R. v Beaumont"	10 October 1973	11 October 1973	12 October 1973
121	"To Suffer a Witch: R. v Vincent"	17 October 1973	18 October 1973	19 October 1973
122	"To Suffer a Witch: R. v Vincent"	17 October 1973	18 October 1973	19 October 1973
123	"To Suffer a Witch: R. v Vincent"	17 October 1973	18 October 1973	19 October 1973
124	"Hit and Miss: R. v Burnett"	24 October 1973	25 October 1973	26 October 1973
125	"Hit and Miss: R. v Burnett"	24 October 1973	25 October 1973	26 October 1973
126	"Hit and Miss: R. v Burnett"	24 October 1973	25 October 1973	26 October 1973
127	"No Spoiling: R. v Smithson"	31 October 1973	1 November 1973	2 November 1973
128	"No Spoiling: R. v Smithson"	31 October 1973	1 November 1973	2 November 1973
129	"No Spoiling: R. v Smithson"	31 October 1973	1 November 1973	2 November 1973
130	"The Age of Leo Trotsky: R. v Smith"	7 November 1973	8 November 1973	9 November 1973
131	"The Age of Leo Trotsky: R. v Smith"	7 November 1973	8 November 1973	9 November 1973
132	"The Age of Leo Trotsky: R. v Smith"	7 November 1973	8 November 1973	9 November 1973
133	"Robin and his Juliet: R. v Tomlin"	14 November 1973	15 November 1973	16 November 1973
134	"Robin and his Juliet: R. v Tomlin"	14 November 1973	15 November 1973	16 November 1973
135	"Robin and his Juliet: R. v Tomlin"	14 November 1973	15 November 1973	16 November 1973
136	"The Most Expensive Steak in the World: Da Costa v McIver"	21 November 1973	22 November 1973	23 November 1973
137	"The Most Expensive Steak in the World: Da Costa v McIver"	21 November 1973	22 November 1973	23 November 1973
138	"The Most Expensive Steak in the World: Da Costa v McIver"	21 November 1973	22 November 1973	23 November 1973
139	"Message to Ireland: R. v Parfitt"	28 November 1973	29 November 1973	30 November 1973
140	"Message to Ireland: R. v Parfitt"	28 November 1973	29 November 1973	30 November 1973
141	"Message to Ireland: R. v Parfitt"	28 November 1973	29 November 1973	30 November 1973
142	"No Smoke Without Fire: R. v Bennington"	5 December 1973	6 December 1973	7 December 1973
143	"No Smoke Without Fire: R. v Bennington"	5 December 1973	6 December 1973	7 December 1973
144	"No Smoke Without Fire: R. v Bennington"	5 December 1973	6 December 1973	7 December 1973
145	"Conduct Prejudicial: R. v Pardoe"	12 December 1973	13 December 1973	14 December 1973
146	"Conduct Prejudicial: R. v Pardoe"	12 December 1973	13 December 1973	14 December 1973
147	"Conduct Prejudicial: R. v Pardoe"	12 December 1973	13 December 1973	14 December 1973
148	"Tables (sic, vide supra in 'Production Details') of the Heart: R. v Saul"	19 December 1973	20 December 1973	21 December 1973
149	"Tables (sic, vide supra in 'Production Details') of the Heart: R. v Saul"	19 December 1973	20 December 1973	21 December 1973
150	"Tables (sic, vide supra in 'Production Details') of the Heart: R. v Saul"	19 December 1973	20 December 1973	21 December 1973
151	"Murder Most Foul: R. v Hammond"	27 December 1973	-	-

=== Series 3 ===
No. in series	Case	Part 1 air date	Part 2 air date	Part 3 air date
1	"The Dogs: R. v Broad"	2 January 1974	3 January 1974	4 January 1974
2	"The Dogs: R. v Broad"	2 January 1974	3 January 1974	4 January 1974
3	"The Dogs: R. v Broad"	2 January 1974	3 January 1974	4 January 1974
4	"Further Charges: R. v Elgar"	9 January 1974	10 January 1974	11 January 1974
5	"Further Charges: R. v Elgar"	9 January 1974	10 January 1974	11 January 1974
6	"Further Charges: R. v Elgar"	9 January 1974	10 January 1974	11 January 1974
7	"Hidden Scars: R. v Fowkes"	16 January 1974	17 January 1974	18 January 1974
8	"Hidden Scars: R. v Fowkes"	16 January 1974	17 January 1974	18 January 1974
9	"Hidden Scars: R. v Fowkes"	16 January 1974	17 January 1974	18 January 1974
10	"With Menaces: R. v Aslam"	23 January 1974	24 January 1974	25 January 1974
11	"With Menaces: R. v Aslam"	23 January 1974	24 January 1974	25 January 1974
12	"With Menaces: R. v Aslam"	23 January 1974	24 January 1974	25 January 1974
13	"Do Your Worst: R. v Skelhorne, McIver and Appleton"	30 January 1974	31 January 1974	1 February 1974
14	"Do Your Worst: R. v Skelhorne, McIver and Appleton"	30 January 1974	31 January 1974	1 February 1974
15	"Do Your Worst: R. v Skelhorne, McIver and Appleton"	30 January 1974	31 January 1974	1 February 1974
16	"The Flight of the Lapwing: Cummings v Simon"	6 February 1974	7 February 1974	8 February 1974
17	"The Flight of the Lapwing: Cummings v Simon"	6 February 1974	7 February 1974	8 February 1974
18	"The Flight of the Lapwing: Cummings v Simon"	6 February 1974	7 February 1974	8 February 1974
19	"The Getaway: R. v McDowell"	13 February 1974	14 February 1974	15 February 1974
20	"The Getaway: R. v McDowell"	13 February 1974	14 February 1974	15 February 1974
21	"The Getaway: R. v McDowell"	13 February 1974	14 February 1974	15 February 1974
"The Getaway" replaced "Traffic Warden's Daughter: R. v Lianos".
22	"The Woman Least Likely ... R. v Rutland"	20 February 1974	21 February 1974	22 February 1974
23	"The Woman Least Likely ... R. v Rutland"	20 February 1974	21 February 1974	22 February 1974
24	"The Woman Least Likely ... R. v Rutland"	20 February 1974	21 February 1974	22 February 1974
25	"A Case of Murder: R. v Povey"	27 February 1974	28 February 1974	1 March 1974
26	"A Case of Murder: R. v Povey"	27 February 1974	28 February 1974	1 March 1974
27	"A Case of Murder: R. v Povey"	27 February 1974	28 February 1974	1 March 1974
28	"The Assault on Choga Sar: Wainwright v Bowman"	6 March 1974	7 March 1974	8 March 1974
29	"The Assault on Choga Sar: Wainwright v Bowman"	6 March 1974	7 March 1974	8 March 1974
30	"The Assault on Choga Sar: Wainwright v Bowman"	6 March 1974	7 March 1974	8 March 1974
31	"Duress: R. v Mallard"	13 March 1974	14 March 1974	15 March 1974
32	"Duress: R. v Mallard"	13 March 1974	14 March 1974	15 March 1974
33	"Duress: R. v Mallard"	13 March 1974	14 March 1974	15 March 1974
34	"30,000 Pieces of Silver: Porter v Porter"	20 March 1974	21 March 1974	22 March 1974
35	"30,000 Pieces of Silver: Porter v Porter"	20 March 1974	21 March 1974	22 March 1974
36	"30,000 Pieces of Silver: Porter v Porter"	20 March 1974	21 March 1974	22 March 1974
37	"Nuts: R. v Holloway"	27 March 1974	28 March 1974	29 March 1974
38	"Nuts: R. v Holloway"	27 March 1974	28 March 1974	29 March 1974
39	"Nuts: R. v Holloway"	27 March 1974	28 March 1974	29 March 1974
40	"Confine to Solitary: R. v Hogarth"	3 April 1974	4 April 1974	5 April 1974
41	"Confine to Solitary: R. v Hogarth"	3 April 1974	4 April 1974	5 April 1974
42	"Confine to Solitary: R. v Hogarth"	3 April 1974	4 April 1974	5 April 1974
43	"Big Annie: Robertson v Ash"	10 April 1974	11 April 1974	12 April 1974
44	"Big Annie: Robertson v Ash"	10 April 1974	11 April 1974	12 April 1974
45	"Big Annie: Robertson v Ash"	10 April 1974	11 April 1974	12 April 1974
46	"Falling Stars: Leigh v Glynn"	17 April 1974	18 April 1974	19 April 1974
47	"Falling Stars: Leigh v Glynn"	17 April 1974	18 April 1974	19 April 1974
48	"Falling Stars: Leigh v Glynn"	17 April 1974	18 April 1974	19 April 1974
49	"Son and Heir: R. v Carvell"	24 April 1974	25 April 1974	26 April 1974
50	"Son and Heir: R. v Carvell"	24 April 1974	25 April 1974	26 April 1974
51	"Son and Heir: R. v Carvell"	24 April 1974	25 April 1974	26 April 1974
52	"Death in the Family: R. v Durrant"	1 May 1974	2 May 1974	3 May 1974
53	"Death in the Family: R. v Durrant"	1 May 1974	2 May 1974	3 May 1974
54	"Death in the Family: R. v Durrant"	1 May 1974	2 May 1974	3 May 1974
55	"Minnie: R. v Barlow"	8 May 1974	9 May 1974	10 May 1974
56	"Minnie: R. v Barlow"	8 May 1974	9 May 1974	10 May 1974
57	"Minnie: R. v Barlow"	8 May 1974	9 May 1974	10 May 1974
58	"Vermin: R. v Brimmer"	15 May 1974	16 May 1974	17 May 1974
59	"Vermin: R. v Brimmer"	15 May 1974	16 May 1974	17 May 1974
60	"Vermin: R. v Brimmer"	15 May 1974	16 May 1974	17 May 1974
61	"South Tower: R. v Carney"	22 May 1974	23 May 1974	24 May 1974
62	"South Tower: R. v Carney"	22 May 1974	23 May 1974	24 May 1974
63	"South Tower: R. v Carney"	22 May 1974	23 May 1974	24 May 1974
64	"Triangle: R. v Prosser and Jackson"	29 May 1974	30 May 1974	31 May 1974
65	"Triangle: R. v Prosser and Jackson"	29 May 1974	30 May 1974	31 May 1974
66	"Triangle: R. v Prosser and Jackson"	29 May 1974	30 May 1974	31 May 1974
67	"Victims of Prejudice: R. v Clark and Hamilton"	5 June 1974	6 June 1974	7 June 1974
68	"Victims of Prejudice: R. v Clark and Hamilton"	5 June 1974	6 June 1974	7 June 1974
69	"Victims of Prejudice: R. v Clark and Hamilton"	5 June 1974	6 June 1974	7 June 1974
70	"Baby Farm: R. v Francis"	12 June 1974	13 June 1974	14 June 1974
71	"Baby Farm: R. v Francis"	12 June 1974	13 June 1974	14 June 1974
72	"Baby Farm: R. v Francis"	12 June 1974	13 June 1974	14 June 1974
73	"For the Good of the Many: R. v Cardy"	19 June 1974	20 June 1974	21 June 1974
74	"For the Good of the Many: R. v Cardy"	19 June 1974	20 June 1974	21 June 1974
75	"For the Good of the Many: R. v Cardy"	19 June 1974	20 June 1974	21 June 1974
76	"How to Rob a Memory Bank: R. v Warren"	26 June 1974	27 June 1974	28 June 1974
77	"How to Rob a Memory Bank: R. v Warren"	26 June 1974	27 June 1974	28 June 1974
78	"How to Rob a Memory Bank: R. v Warren"	26 June 1974	27 June 1974	28 June 1974
79	"The Wreck of the Tedmar: R. v Blaney"	3 July 1974	4 July 1974	5 July 1974
80	"The Wreck of the Tedmar: R. v Blaney"	3 July 1974	4 July 1974	5 July 1974
81	"The Wreck of the Tedmar: R. v Blaney"	3 July 1974	4 July 1974	5 July 1974
82	"Two Rings for Margie: R. v Middleton"	10 July 1974	11 July 1974	12 July 1974
83	"Two Rings for Margie: R. v Middleton"	10 July 1974	11 July 1974	12 July 1974
84	"Two Rings for Margie: R. v Middleton"	10 July 1974	11 July 1974	12 July 1974
85	"No Stranger in Court: R. v Clegg"	17 July 1974	18 July 1974	19 July 1974
86	"No Stranger in Court: R. v Clegg"	17 July 1974	18 July 1974	19 July 1974
87	"No Stranger in Court: R. v Clegg"	17 July 1974	18 July 1974	19 July 1974
88	"Security Risk: R. v Denton"	24 July 1974	25 July 1974	26 July 1974
89	"Security Risk: R. v Denton"	24 July 1974	25 July 1974	26 July 1974
90	"Security Risk: R. v Denton"	24 July 1974	25 July 1974	26 July 1974
91	"The Probationer: R. v Cresswell"	31 July 1974	1 August 1974	2 August 1974
92	"The Probationer: R. v Cresswell"	31 July 1974	1 August 1974	2 August 1974
93	"The Probationer: R. v Cresswell"	31 July 1974	1 August 1974	2 August 1974
94	"Midnight with No Pain"	7 August 1974	8 August 1974	9 August 1974
95	"Midnight with No Pain"	7 August 1974	8 August 1974	9 August 1974
96	"Midnight with No Pain"	7 August 1974	8 August 1974	9 August 1974
97	"Not Dead But Gone Before"	14 August 1974	15 August 1974	16 August 1974
98	"Not Dead But Gone Before"	14 August 1974	15 August 1974	16 August 1974
99	"Not Dead But Gone Before"	14 August 1974	15 August 1974	16 August 1974
100	"Corruption"	21 August 1974	22 August 1974	23 August 1974
101	"Corruption"	21 August 1974	22 August 1974	23 August 1974
102	"Corruption"	21 August 1974	22 August 1974	23 August 1974
103	"Pickets"	28 August 1974	29 August 1974	30 August 1974
104	"Pickets"	28 August 1974	29 August 1974	30 August 1974
105	"Pickets"	28 August 1974	29 August 1974	30 August 1974
106	"The Dogs Next Door"	4 September 1974	5 September 1974	6 September 1974
107	"The Dogs Next Door"	4 September 1974	5 September 1974	6 September 1974
108	"The Dogs Next Door"	4 September 1974	5 September 1974	6 September 1974
109	"Good and Faithful Friends"	11 September 1974	12 September 1974	13 September 1974
110	"Good and Faithful Friends"	11 September 1974	12 September 1974	13 September 1974
111	"Good and Faithful Friends"	11 September 1974	12 September 1974	13 September 1974
112	"Strange Past"	18 September 1974	19 September 1974	20 September 1974
113	"Strange Past"	18 September 1974	19 September 1974	20 September 1974
114	"Strange Past"	18 September 1974	19 September 1974	20 September 1974
115	"On Impulse"	25 September 1974	26 September 1974	27 September 1974
116	"On Impulse"	25 September 1974	26 September 1974	27 September 1974
117	"On Impulse"	25 September 1974	26 September 1974	27 September 1974
118	"Double, Double"	2 October 1974	3 October 1974	4 October 1974
119	"Double, Double"	2 October 1974	3 October 1974	4 October 1974
120	"Double, Double"	2 October 1974	3 October 1974	4 October 1974
121	"The Hunt"	9 October 1974	10 October 1974	11 October 1974
122	"The Hunt"	9 October 1974	10 October 1974	11 October 1974
123	"The Hunt"	9 October 1974	10 October 1974	11 October 1974
124	"The Messenger Boy"	16 October 1974	17 October 1974	18 October 1974
125	"The Messenger Boy"	16 October 1974	17 October 1974	18 October 1974
126	"The Messenger Boy"	16 October 1974	17 October 1974	18 October 1974
127	"The Dashing Young Officer"	23 October 1974	24 October 1974	25 October 1974
128	"The Dashing Young Officer"	23 October 1974	24 October 1974	25 October 1974
129	"The Dashing Young Officer"	23 October 1974	24 October 1974	25 October 1974
130	"Immoral Earnings"	30 October 1974	31 October 1974	1 November 1974
131	"Immoral Earnings"	30 October 1974	31 October 1974	1 November 1974
132	"Immoral Earnings"	30 October 1974	31 October 1974	1 November 1974
133	"Winklers"	6 November 1974	7 November 1974	8 November 1974
134	"Winklers"	6 November 1974	7 November 1974	8 November 1974
135	"Winklers"	6 November 1974	7 November 1974	8 November 1974
136	"The Alb of St. Honoratus"	13 November 1974	14 November 1974	15 November 1974
137	"The Alb of St. Honoratus"	13 November 1974	14 November 1974	15 November 1974
138	"The Alb of St. Honoratus"	13 November 1974	14 November 1974	15 November 1974
139	"Cover Up"	20 November 1974	21 November 1974	22 November 1974
140	"Cover Up"	20 November 1974	21 November 1974	22 November 1974
141	"Cover Up"	20 November 1974	21 November 1974	22 November 1974
142	"Beloved Alien"	27 November 1974	28 November 1974	29 November 1974
143	"Beloved Alien"	27 November 1974	28 November 1974	29 November 1974
144	"Beloved Alien"	27 November 1974	28 November 1974	29 November 1974
145	"Arson"	4 December 1974	5 December 1974	6 December 1974
146	"Arson"	4 December 1974	5 December 1974	6 December 1974
147	"Arson"	4 December 1974	5 December 1974	6 December 1974
148	"Forgive-Me-Not"	11 December 1974	12 December 1974	13 December 1974
149	"Forgive-Me-Not"	11 December 1974	12 December 1974	13 December 1974
150	"Forgive-Me-Not"	11 December 1974	12 December 1974	13 December 1974
151	"Pot of Basil"	18 December 1974	19 December 1974	20 December 1974
152	"Pot of Basil"	18 December 1974	19 December 1974	20 December 1974
153	"Pot of Basil"	18 December 1974	19 December 1974	20 December 1974

=== Series 4 ===
No. in series	Case	Part 1 air date	Part 2 air date	Part 3 air date
1	"Ring in the New Year"	2 January 1975	3 January 1975	
2	"Ring in the New Year"	2 January 1975	3 January 1975	
3	"The Quest"	8 January 1975	9 January 1975	10 January 1975
4	"The Quest"	8 January 1975	9 January 1975	10 January 1975
5	"The Quest"	8 January 1975	9 January 1975	10 January 1975
6	"A Difference in Style"	15 January 1975	16 January 1975	17 January 1975
7	"A Difference in Style"	15 January 1975	16 January 1975	17 January 1975
8	"A Difference in Style"	15 January 1975	16 January 1975	17 January 1975
9	"Matron"	22 January 1975	23 January 1975	24 January 1975
10	"Matron"	22 January 1975	23 January 1975	24 January 1975
11	"Matron"	22 January 1975	23 January 1975	24 January 1975
12	"The Personator"	29 January 1975	30 January 1975	31 January 1975
13	"The Personator"	29 January 1975	30 January 1975	31 January 1975
14	"The Personator"	29 January 1975	30 January 1975	31 January 1975
15	"Two in the Mind of One"	5 February 1975	6 February 1975	7 February 1975
16	"Two in the Mind of One"	5 February 1975	6 February 1975	7 February 1975
17	"Two in the Mind of One"	5 February 1975	6 February 1975	7 February 1975
18	"The Murder Monitor"	12 February 1975	13 February 1975	14 February 1975
19	"The Murder Monitor"	12 February 1975	13 February 1975	14 February 1975
20	"The Murder Monitor"	12 February 1975	13 February 1975	14 February 1975
21	"Who Cares?"	19 February 1975	20 February 1975	21 February 1975
22	"Who Cares?"	19 February 1975	20 February 1975	21 February 1975
23	"Who Cares?"	19 February 1975	20 February 1975	21 February 1975
24	"Saboteur"	26 February 1975	27 February 1975	28 February 1975
25	"Saboteur"	26 February 1975	27 February 1975	28 February 1975
26	"Saboteur"	26 February 1975	27 February 1975	28 February 1975
27	"The Trees"	5 March 1975	6 March 1975	7 March 1975
28	"The Trees"	5 March 1975	6 March 1975	7 March 1975
29	"The Trees"	5 March 1975	6 March 1975	7 March 1975
30	"Bad Day at Black Cape"	12 March 1975	13 March 1975	14 March 1975
31	"Bad Day at Black Cape"	12 March 1975	13 March 1975	14 March 1975
32	"Bad Day at Black Cape"	12 March 1975	13 March 1975	14 March 1975
33	"The Mad, Mad Man"	19 March 1975	20 March 1975	21 March 1975
34	"The Mad, Mad Man"	19 March 1975	20 March 1975	21 March 1975
35	"The Mad, Mad Man"	19 March 1975	20 March 1975	21 March 1975
36	"Contempt of Court"	26 March 1975	27 March 1975	28 March 1975
37	"Contempt of Court"	26 March 1975	27 March 1975	28 March 1975
38	"Contempt of Court"	26 March 1975	27 March 1975	28 March 1975
39	"Possessed"	2 April 1975	3 April 1975	4 April 1975
40	"Possessed"	2 April 1975	3 April 1975	4 April 1975
41	"Possessed"	2 April 1975	3 April 1975	4 April 1975
42	"The Also Ran"	9 April 1975	10 April 1975	11 April 1975
43	"The Also Ran"	9 April 1975	10 April 1975	11 April 1975
44	"The Also Ran"	9 April 1975	10 April 1975	11 April 1975
45	"Take Back Your Mink"	16 April 1975	17 April 1975	18 April 1975
46	"Take Back Your Mink"	16 April 1975	17 April 1975	18 April 1975
47	"Take Back Your Mink"	16 April 1975	17 April 1975	18 April 1975
48	"Dead Drunk"	23 April 1975	24 April 1975	25 April 1975
49	"Dead Drunk"	23 April 1975	24 April 1975	25 April 1975
50	"Dead Drunk"	23 April 1975	24 April 1975	25 April 1975
51	"Light the Blue Touch-Paper"	30 April 1975	1 May 1975	2 May 1975
52	"Light the Blue Touch-Paper"	30 April 1975	1 May 1975	2 May 1975
53	"Light the Blue Touch-Paper"	30 April 1975	1 May 1975	2 May 1975
54	"The Healing Hand"	7 May 1975	8 May 1975	9 May 1975
55	"The Healing Hand"	7 May 1975	8 May 1975	9 May 1975
56	"The Healing Hand"	7 May 1975	8 May 1975	9 May 1975
57	"The Obsession"	14 May 1975	15 May 1975	16 May 1975
58	"The Obsession"	14 May 1975	15 May 1975	16 May 1975
59	"The Obsession"	14 May 1975	15 May 1975	16 May 1975
60	"My Mother Said I Never Should ..."	21 May 1975	22 May 1975	23 May 1975
61	"My Mother Said I Never Should ..."	21 May 1975	22 May 1975	23 May 1975
62	"My Mother Said I Never Should ..."	21 May 1975	22 May 1975	23 May 1975
63	"Who Killed Cock Robin?"	19 July 1975	-	-
64	"Songbirds Out of Tune"	26 July 1975	-	-
65	"Inner City Blues"	2 August 1975	-	-
66	"Marathon"	9 August 1975	-	-
67	"The Natural Bond"	16 August 1975	-	-
68	"Evil Liver"	23 August 1975	-	-
69	"An Evil Influence"	15 October 1975	16 October 1975	17 October 1975
70	"An Evil Influence"	15 October 1975	16 October 1975	17 October 1975
71	"An Evil Influence"	15 October 1975	16 October 1975	17 October 1975
72	"Never on Saturdays, Never on Sundays"	22 October 1975	23 October 1975	24 October 1975
73	"Never on Saturdays, Never on Sundays"	22 October 1975	23 October 1975	24 October 1975
74	"Never on Saturdays, Never on Sundays"	22 October 1975	23 October 1975	24 October 1975
75	"Will the Real Robert Randell Please Stand Up"	29 October 1975	30 October 1975	31 October 1975
76	"Will the Real Robert Randell Please Stand Up"	29 October 1975	30 October 1975	31 October 1975
77	"Will the Real Robert Randell Please Stand Up"	29 October 1975	30 October 1975	31 October 1975
78	"Hunger Strike"	5 November 1975	6 November 1975	7 November 1975
79	"Hunger Strike"	5 November 1975	6 November 1975	7 November 1975
80	"Hunger Strike"	5 November 1975	6 November 1975	7 November 1975
81	"An Englishman's Home"	12 November 1975	13 November 1975	14 November 1975
82	"An Englishman's Home"	12 November 1975	13 November 1975	14 November 1975
83	"An Englishman's Home"	12 November 1975	13 November 1975	14 November 1975
84	"Blood Is Thicker"	19 November 1975	20 November 1975	21 November 1975
85	"Blood Is Thicker"	19 November 1975	20 November 1975	21 November 1975
86	"Blood Is Thicker"	19 November 1975	20 November 1975	21 November 1975
87	"The Party's Over"	26 November 1975	27 November 1975	28 November 1975
88	"The Party's Over"	26 November 1975	27 November 1975	28 November 1975
89	"The Party's Over"	26 November 1975	27 November 1975	28 November 1975
90	"The Extremist"	3 December 1975	4 December 1975	5 December 1975
91	"The Extremist"	3 December 1975	4 December 1975	5 December 1975
92	"The Extremist"	3 December 1975	4 December 1975	5 December 1975
93	"Mother Love"	10 December 1975	11 December 1975	12 December 1975
94	"Mother Love"	10 December 1975	11 December 1975	12 December 1975
95	"Mother Love"	10 December 1975	11 December 1975	12 December 1975
96	"Dicing"	17 December 1975	18 December 1975	19 December 1975
97	"Dicing"	17 December 1975	18 December 1975	19 December 1975
98	"Dicing"	17 December 1975	18 December 1975	19 December 1975
99	"Humpty Dumpty Sat on the Wall"	31 December 1975	-	-

=== Series 5 ===
No. in series	Case	Part 1 air date	Part 2 air date	Part 3 air date
1	"Humpty Dumpty Sat on the Wall"	-	1 January 1976	2 January 1976
2	"Humpty Dumpty Sat on the Wall"	-	1 January 1976	2 January 1976
3	"Crime and Passion"	7 January 1976	8 January 1976	9 January 1976
4	"Crime and Passion"	7 January 1976	8 January 1976	9 January 1976
5	"Crime and Passion"	7 January 1976	8 January 1976	9 January 1976
6	"... Or Was He Pushed?"	14 January 1976	15 January 1976	16 January 1976
7	"... Or Was He Pushed?"	14 January 1976	15 January 1976	16 January 1976
8	"... Or Was He Pushed?"	14 January 1976	15 January 1976	16 January 1976
9	"No Questions Asked"	21 January 1976	22 January 1976	23 January 1976
10	"No Questions Asked"	21 January 1976	22 January 1976	23 January 1976
11	"No Questions Asked"	21 January 1976	22 January 1976	23 January 1976
12	"The Right of Every Woman"	28 January 1976	29 January 1976	30 January 1976
13	"The Right of Every Woman"	28 January 1976	29 January 1976	30 January 1976
14	"The Right of Every Woman"	28 January 1976	29 January 1976	30 January 1976
15	"Beyond the Call of Duty"	4 February 1976	5 February 1976	6 February 1976
16	"Beyond the Call of Duty"	4 February 1976	5 February 1976	6 February 1976
17	"Beyond the Call of Duty"	4 February 1976	5 February 1976	6 February 1976
18	"To Love, Cherish – and Batter"	11 February 1976	12 February 1976	13 February 1976
19	"To Love, Cherish – and Batter"	11 February 1976	12 February 1976	13 February 1976
20	"To Love, Cherish – and Batter"	11 February 1976	12 February 1976	13 February 1976
21	"Scard"	18 February 1976	19 February 1976	20 February 1976
22	"Scard"	18 February 1976	19 February 1976	20 February 1976
23	"Scard"	18 February 1976	19 February 1976	20 February 1976
24	"Tell the Truth and Shame the Devil"	25 February 1976	26 February 1976	27 February 1976
25	"Tell the Truth and Shame the Devil"	25 February 1976	26 February 1976	27 February 1976
26	"Tell the Truth and Shame the Devil"	25 February 1976	26 February 1976	27 February 1976
27	"The Ju-Ju Landlord"	3 March 1976	4 March 1976	5 March 1976
28	"The Ju-Ju Landlord"	3 March 1976	4 March 1976	5 March 1976
29	"The Ju-Ju Landlord"	3 March 1976	4 March 1976	5 March 1976
30	"Ends and Means"	10 March 1976	11 March 1976	12 March 1976
31	"Ends and Means"	10 March 1976	11 March 1976	12 March 1976
32	"Ends and Means"	10 March 1976	11 March 1976	12 March 1976
33	"Incorrigible Rogue"	17 March 1976	18 March 1976	19 March 1976
34	"Incorrigible Rogue"	17 March 1976	18 March 1976	19 March 1976
35	"Incorrigible Rogue"	17 March 1976	18 March 1976	19 March 1976
36	"Drunk, Who Cares"	30 March 1976	31 March 1976	1 April 1976
37	"Drunk, Who Cares"	30 March 1976	31 March 1976	1 April 1976
38	"Drunk, Who Cares"	30 March 1976	31 March 1976	1 April 1976
39	"Accepted Standards"	6 April 1976	7 April 1976	8 April 1976
40	"Accepted Standards"	6 April 1976	7 April 1976	8 April 1976
41	"Accepted Standards"	6 April 1976	7 April 1976	8 April 1976
42	"The Jolly Swagmen"	13 April 1976	14 April 1976	15 April 1976
43	"The Jolly Swagmen"	13 April 1976	14 April 1976	15 April 1976
44	"The Jolly Swagmen"	13 April 1976	14 April 1976	15 April 1976
45	"A Bang or a Whimper"	4 May 1976	5 May 1976	6 May 1976
46	"A Bang or a Whimper"	4 May 1976	5 May 1976	6 May 1976
47	"A Bang or a Whimper"	4 May 1976	5 May 1976	6 May 1976
48	"Pigmented Patter"	19 May 1976	20 May 1976	21 May 1976
49	"Pigmented Patter"	19 May 1976	20 May 1976	21 May 1976
50	"Pigmented Patter"	19 May 1976	20 May 1976	21 May 1976
51	"Stranger in the Night"	6 October 1976	7 October 1976	8 October 1976
52	"Stranger in the Night"	6 October 1976	7 October 1976	8 October 1976
53	"Stranger in the Night"	6 October 1976	7 October 1976	8 October 1976
54	"Those in Peril"	13 October 1976	14 October 1976	15 October 1976
55	"Those in Peril"	13 October 1976	14 October 1976	15 October 1976
56	"Those in Peril"	13 October 1976	14 October 1976	15 October 1976
57	"A Working Girl"	20 October 1976	21 October 1976	22 October 1976
58	"A Working Girl"	20 October 1976	21 October 1976	22 October 1976
59	"A Working Girl"	20 October 1976	21 October 1976	22 October 1976
60	"A Matter of Honour"	27 October 1976	28 October 1976	29 October 1976
61	"A Matter of Honour"	27 October 1976	28 October 1976	29 October 1976
62	"A Matter of Honour"	27 October 1976	28 October 1976	29 October 1976
63	"Inside Story"	3 November 1976	4 November 1976	5 November 1976
64	"Inside Story"	3 November 1976	4 November 1976	5 November 1976
65	"Inside Story"	3 November 1976	4 November 1976	5 November 1976
66	"Death for Sale"	10 November 1976	11 November 1976	12 November 1976
67	"Death for Sale"	10 November 1976	11 November 1976	12 November 1976
68	"Death for Sale"	10 November 1976	11 November 1976	12 November 1976
69	"Treewomen of Jagden Crag"	17 November 1976	18 November 1976	19 November 1976
70	"Treewomen of Jagden Crag"	17 November 1976	18 November 1976	19 November 1976
71	"Treewomen of Jagden Crag"	17 November 1976	18 November 1976	19 November 1976
72	"You Won't Escape When Hendrik Witbooi Comes"	24 November 1976	25 November 1976	26 November 1976
73	"You Won't Escape When Hendrik Witbooi Comes"	24 November 1976	25 November 1976	26 November 1976
74	"You Won't Escape When Hendrik Witbooi Comes"	24 November 1976	25 November 1976	26 November 1976
75	"Operation Happiness"	1 December 1976	2 December 1976	3 December 1976
76	"Operation Happiness"	1 December 1976	2 December 1976	3 December 1976
77	"Operation Happiness"	1 December 1976	2 December 1976	3 December 1976
78	"Lola"	8 December 1976	9 December 1976	10 December 1976
79	"Lola"	8 December 1976	9 December 1976	10 December 1976
80	"Lola"	8 December 1976	9 December 1976	10 December 1976
81	"Royalties"	15 December 1976	16 December 1976	17 December 1976
82	"Royalties"	15 December 1976	16 December 1976	17 December 1976
83	"Royalties"	15 December 1976	16 December 1976	17 December 1976
84	"A World of Difference"	22 December 1976	23 December 1976	24 December 1976
85	"A World of Difference"	22 December 1976	23 December 1976	24 December 1976
86	"A World of Difference"	22 December 1976	23 December 1976	24 December 1976
87	"Auld Lang Syne"	29 December 1976	30 December 1976	31 December 1976
88	"Auld Lang Syne"	29 December 1976	30 December 1976	31 December 1976
89	"Auld Lang Syne"	29 December 1976	30 December 1976	31 December 1976

=== Series 6 ===
No. in series	Case	Part 1 air date	Part 2 air date	Part 3 air date
1	"Beauty and the Beast"	4 January 1977	5 January 1977	6 January 1977
2	"Beauty and the Beast"	4 January 1977	5 January 1977	6 January 1977
3	"Beauty and the Beast"	4 January 1977	5 January 1977	6 January 1977
4	"Home Sweet Home"	25 January 1977	26 January 1977	27 January 1977
5	"Home Sweet Home"	25 January 1977	26 January 1977	27 January 1977
6	"Home Sweet Home"	25 January 1977	26 January 1977	27 January 1977
7	"Loved Ones"	1 February 1977	2 February 1977	3 February 1977
8	"Loved Ones"	1 February 1977	2 February 1977	3 February 1977
9	"Loved Ones"	1 February 1977	2 February 1977	3 February 1977
10	"We Are the Champions"	8 February 1977	9 February 1977	10 February 1977
11	"We Are the Champions"	8 February 1977	9 February 1977	10 February 1977
12	"We Are the Champions"	8 February 1977	9 February 1977	10 February 1977
13	"A Ladies' Man"	15 February 1977	16 February 1977	17 February 1977
14	"A Ladies' Man"	15 February 1977	16 February 1977	17 February 1977
15	"A Ladies' Man"	15 February 1977	16 February 1977	17 February 1977
16	"A Matter of Faith"	22 February 1977	23 February 1977	24 February 1977
17	"A Matter of Faith"	22 February 1977	23 February 1977	24 February 1977
18	"A Matter of Faith"	22 February 1977	23 February 1977	24 February 1977
19	"Crime Passionel"	1 March 1977	2 March 1977	3 March 1977
20	"Crime Passionel"	1 March 1977	2 March 1977	3 March 1977
21	"Crime Passionel"	1 March 1977	2 March 1977	3 March 1977
22	"A Swinging Couple"	8 March 1977	9 March 1977	10 March 1977
23	"A Swinging Couple"	8 March 1977	9 March 1977	10 March 1977
24	"A Swinging Couple"	8 March 1977	9 March 1977	10 March 1977
25	"One for the Road"	15 March 1977	16 March 1977	17 March 1977
26	"One for the Road"	15 March 1977	16 March 1977	17 March 1977
27	"One for the Road"	15 March 1977	16 March 1977	17 March 1977
28	"Such a Charming Man"	22 March 1977	23 March 1977	24 March 1977
29	"Such a Charming Man"	22 March 1977	23 March 1977	24 March 1977
30	"Such a Charming Man"	22 March 1977	23 March 1977	24 March 1977
31	"A Sheep in Wolf's Clothing"	24 March 1977	24 March 1977	24 March 1977
32	"A Sheep in Wolf's Clothing"	24 March 1977	24 March 1977	24 March 1977
33	"A Sheep in Wolf's Clothing"	24 March 1977	24 March 1977	24 March 1977
34	"The Family Business"	5 April 1977	6 April 1977	7 April 1977
35	"The Family Business"	5 April 1977	6 April 1977	7 April 1977
36	"The Family Business"	5 April 1977	6 April 1977	7 April 1977
37	"A Pocketful of Pills"	18 October 1977	19 October 1977	20 October 1977
38	"A Pocketful of Pills"	18 October 1977	19 October 1977	20 October 1977
39	"A Pocketful of Pills"	18 October 1977	19 October 1977	20 October 1977
40	"Capers Among the Catacombs"	25 October 1977	26 October 1977	27 October 1977
41	"Capers Among the Catacombs"	25 October 1977	26 October 1977	27 October 1977
42	"Capers Among the Catacombs"	25 October 1977	26 October 1977	27 October 1977
43	"Kiss and Tell"	1 November 1977	2 November 1977	3 November 1977
44	"Kiss and Tell"	1 November 1977	2 November 1977	3 November 1977
45	"Kiss and Tell"	1 November 1977	2 November 1977	3 November 1977
46	"Down Will Come Baby"	8 November 1977	9 November 1977	10 November 1977
47	"Down Will Come Baby"	8 November 1977	9 November 1977	10 November 1977
48	"Down Will Come Baby"	8 November 1977	9 November 1977	10 November 1977
49	"The Silencer"	15 November 1977	16 November 1977	17 November 1977
50	"The Silencer"	15 November 1977	16 November 1977	17 November 1977
51	"The Silencer"	15 November 1977	16 November 1977	17 November 1977
52	"Home"	22 November 1977	23 November 1977	24 November 1977
53	"Home"	22 November 1977	23 November 1977	24 November 1977
54	"Home"	22 November 1977	23 November 1977	24 November 1977
55	"A Place to Stay"	29 November 1977	30 November 1977	1 December 1977
56	"A Place to Stay"	29 November 1977	30 November 1977	1 December 1977
57	"A Place to Stay"	29 November 1977	30 November 1977	1 December 1977
58	"Safe as Houses"	6 December 1977	7 December 1977	8 December 1977
59	"Safe as Houses"	6 December 1977	7 December 1977	8 December 1977
60	"Safe as Houses"	6 December 1977	7 December 1977	8 December 1977
61	"Street Gang"	13 December 1977	14 December 1977	15 December 1977
62	"Street Gang"	13 December 1977	14 December 1977	15 December 1977
63	"Street Gang"	13 December 1977	14 December 1977	15 December 1977
64	"An Upward Fall: Cosmic Planning Consultants v Rosenberg Research Foundation"	20 December 1977	21 December 1977	22 December 1977
65	"An Upward Fall: Cosmic Planning Consultants v Rosenberg Research Foundation"	20 December 1977	21 December 1977	22 December 1977
66	"An Upward Fall: Cosmic Planning Consultants v Rosenberg Research Foundation"	20 December 1977	21 December 1977	22 December 1977

=== Series 7 ===
No. in series	Case	Part 1 air date	Part 2 air date	Part 3 air date
1	"Black and Blue"	3 January 1978	4 January 1978	5 January 1978
2	"Black and Blue"	3 January 1978	4 January 1978	5 January 1978
3	"Black and Blue"	3 January 1978	4 January 1978	5 January 1978
4	"Meeting Place"	10 January 1978	11 January 1978	12 January 1978
5	"Meeting Place"	10 January 1978	11 January 1978	12 January 1978
6	"Meeting Place"	10 January 1978	11 January 1978	12 January 1978
7	"Echoes"	17 January 1978	18 January 1978	19 January 1978
8	"Echoes"	17 January 1978	18 January 1978	19 January 1978
9	"Echoes"	17 January 1978	18 January 1978	19 January 1978
10	"White Lies"	24 January 1978	25 January 1978	26 January 1978
11	"White Lies"	24 January 1978	25 January 1978	26 January 1978
12	"White Lies"	24 January 1978	25 January 1978	26 January 1978
13	"The Song Not the Singer"	31 January 1978	1 February 1978	2 February 1978
14	"The Song Not the Singer"	31 January 1978	1 February 1978	2 February 1978
15	"The Song Not the Singer"	31 January 1978	1 February 1978	2 February 1978
16	"Michael"	7 February 1978	8 February 1978	9 February 1978
17	"Michael"	7 February 1978	8 February 1978	9 February 1978
18	"Michael"	7 February 1978	8 February 1978	9 February 1978
19	"Association"	14 February 1978	15 February 1978	16 February 1978
20	"Association"	14 February 1978	15 February 1978	16 February 1978
21	"Association"	14 February 1978	15 February 1978	16 February 1978
22	"Still Life with Feathers"	21 February 1978	22 February 1978	23 February 1978
23	"Still Life with Feathers"	21 February 1978	22 February 1978	23 February 1978
24	"Still Life with Feathers"	21 February 1978	22 February 1978	23 February 1978
25	"Cat in Hell"	28 February 1978	1 March 1978	2 March 1978
26	"Cat in Hell"	28 February 1978	1 March 1978	2 March 1978
27	"Cat in Hell"	28 February 1978	1 March 1978	2 March 1978
28	"To Catch a Thief"	7 March 1978	8 March 1978	9 March 1978
29	"To Catch a Thief"	7 March 1978	8 March 1978	9 March 1978
30	"To Catch a Thief"	7 March 1978	8 March 1978	9 March 1978
31	"The Change"	14 March 1978	15 March 1978	16 March 1978
32	"The Change"	14 March 1978	15 March 1978	16 March 1978
33	"The Change"	14 March 1978	15 March 1978	16 March 1978
34	"The Jawbone of an Ass"	21 March 1978	22 March 1978	23 March 1978
35	"The Jawbone of an Ass"	21 March 1978	22 March 1978	23 March 1978
36	"The Jawbone of an Ass"	21 March 1978	22 March 1978	23 March 1978
37	"Two Thousand Witnesses"	28 March 1978	29 March 1978	30 March 1978
38	"Two Thousand Witnesses"	28 March 1978	29 March 1978	30 March 1978
39	"Two Thousand Witnesses"	28 March 1978	29 March 1978	30 March 1978
40	"Code"	4 April 1978	5 April 1978	6 April 1978
41	"Code"	4 April 1978	5 April 1978	6 April 1978
42	"Code"	4 April 1978	5 April 1978	6 April 1978
43	"Common Sense"	11 April 1978	12 April 1978	13 April 1978
44	"Common Sense"	11 April 1978	12 April 1978	13 April 1978
45	"Common Sense"	11 April 1978	12 April 1978	13 April 1978
46	"In the Heat of the Moment"	5 September 1978	6 September 1978	7 September 1978
47	"In the Heat of the Moment"	5 September 1978	6 September 1978	7 September 1978
48	"In the Heat of the Moment"	5 September 1978	6 September 1978	7 September 1978
49	"Does Your Mother Know You're Out?"	12 September 1978	13 September 1978	14 September 1978
50	"Does Your Mother Know You're Out?"	12 September 1978	13 September 1978	14 September 1978
51	"Does Your Mother Know You're Out?"	12 September 1978	13 September 1978	14 September 1978
52	"The Crown of Life"	19 September 1978	20 September 1978	21 September 1978
53	"The Crown of Life"	19 September 1978	20 September 1978	21 September 1978
54	"The Crown of Life"	19 September 1978	20 September 1978	21 September 1978
55	"Past Times"	26 September 1978	27 September 1978	28 September 1978
56	"Past Times"	26 September 1978	27 September 1978	28 September 1978
57	"Past Times"	26 September 1978	27 September 1978	28 September 1978
58	"Queen Bee"	3 October 1978	4 October 1978	5 October 1978
59	"Queen Bee"	3 October 1978	4 October 1978	5 October 1978
60	"Queen Bee"	3 October 1978	4 October 1978	5 October 1978
61	"The Green House Girls"	10 October 1978	11 October 1978	12 October 1978
62	"The Green House Girls"	10 October 1978	11 October 1978	12 October 1978
63	"The Green House Girls"	10 October 1978	11 October 1978	12 October 1978
64	"Through the Bottom of a Glass Darkly"	17 October 1978	18 October 1978	19 October 1978
65	"Through the Bottom of a Glass Darkly"	17 October 1978	18 October 1978	19 October 1978
66	"Through the Bottom of a Glass Darkly"	17 October 1978	18 October 1978	19 October 1978
67	"Still Waters"	24 October 1978	25 October 1978	26 October 1978
68	"Still Waters"	24 October 1978	25 October 1978	26 October 1978
69	"Still Waters"	24 October 1978	25 October 1978	26 October 1978
70	"A Man with Everything"	31 October 1978	1 November 1978	2 November 1978
71	"A Man with Everything"	31 October 1978	1 November 1978	2 November 1978
72	"A Man with Everything"	31 October 1978	1 November 1978	2 November 1978
73	"Scalped"	7 November 1978	8 November 1978	9 November 1978
74	"Scalped"	7 November 1978	8 November 1978	9 November 1978
75	"Scalped"	7 November 1978	8 November 1978	9 November 1978
76	"Soft Target"	14 November 1978	15 November 1978	16 November 1978
77	"Soft Target"	14 November 1978	15 November 1978	16 November 1978
78	"Soft Target"	14 November 1978	15 November 1978	16 November 1978

=== Series 8 ===
No. in series	Case	Part 1 air date	Part 2 air date	Part 3 air date
1	"Somebody"	2 January 1979	3 January 1979	4 January 1979
2	"Somebody"	2 January 1979	3 January 1979	4 January 1979
3	"Somebody"	2 January 1979	3 January 1979	4 January 1979
4	"Beyond the Limits"	9 January 1979	10 January 1979	11 January 1979
5	"Beyond the Limits"	9 January 1979	10 January 1979	11 January 1979
6	"Beyond the Limits"	9 January 1979	10 January 1979	11 January 1979
7	"Sugar and Spice"	16 January 1979	17 January 1979	18 January 1979
8	"Sugar and Spice"	16 January 1979	17 January 1979	18 January 1979
9	"Sugar and Spice"	16 January 1979	17 January 1979	18 January 1979
10	"Hospital Roulette"	23 January 1979	24 January 1979	25 January 1979
11	"Hospital Roulette"	23 January 1979	24 January 1979	25 January 1979
12	"Hospital Roulette"	23 January 1979	24 January 1979	25 January 1979
13	"A Friend of the Family"	30 January 1979	31 January 1979	1 February 1979
14	"A Friend of the Family"	30 January 1979	31 January 1979	1 February 1979
15	"A Friend of the Family"	30 January 1979	31 January 1979	1 February 1979
16	"Baby Love"	6 February 1979	7 February 1979	8 February 1979
17	"Baby Love"	6 February 1979	7 February 1979	8 February 1979
18	"Baby Love"	6 February 1979	7 February 1979	8 February 1979
19	"Honour Thy Father and Thy Mother"	13 February 1979	14 February 1979	15 February 1979
20	"Honour Thy Father and Thy Mother"	13 February 1979	14 February 1979	15 February 1979
21	"Honour Thy Father and Thy Mother"	13 February 1979	14 February 1979	15 February 1979
22	"My Brother's Son"	20 February 1979	21 February 1979	22 February 1979
23	"My Brother's Son"	20 February 1979	21 February 1979	22 February 1979
24	"My Brother's Son"	20 February 1979	21 February 1979	22 February 1979
25	"Cash"	27 February 1979	28 February 1979	1 March 1979
26	"Cash"	27 February 1979	28 February 1979	1 March 1979
27	"Cash"	27 February 1979	28 February 1979	1 March 1979
28	"Boys Will Be Boys"	6 March 1979	7 March 1979	8 March 1979
29	"Boys Will Be Boys"	6 March 1979	7 March 1979	8 March 1979
30	"Boys Will Be Boys"	6 March 1979	7 March 1979	8 March 1979
31	"The Deep End"	13 March 1979	14 March 1979	15 March 1979
32	"The Deep End"	13 March 1979	14 March 1979	15 March 1979
33	"The Deep End"	13 March 1979	14 March 1979	15 March 1979
34	"Rebel at Law"	20 March 1979	21 March 1979	22 March 1979
35	"Rebel at Law"	20 March 1979	21 March 1979	22 March 1979
36	"Rebel at Law"	20 March 1979	21 March 1979	22 March 1979
37	"A Hunting We Will Go"	27 March 1979	28 March 1979	29 March 1979
38	"A Hunting We Will Go"	27 March 1979	28 March 1979	29 March 1979
39	"A Hunting We Will Go"	27 March 1979	28 March 1979	29 March 1979
40	"Question of Care"	3 April 1979	4 April 1979	5 April 1979
41	"Question of Care"	3 April 1979	4 April 1979	5 April 1979
42	"Question of Care"	3 April 1979	4 April 1979	5 April 1979
43	"Cowboy"	10 April 1979	11 April 1979	12 April 1979
44	"Cowboy"	10 April 1979	11 April 1979	12 April 1979
45	"Cowboy"	10 April 1979	11 April 1979	12 April 1979
46	"Forever"	1 May 1979	2 May 1979	3 May 1979
47	"Forever"	1 May 1979	2 May 1979	3 May 1979
48	"Forever"	1 May 1979	2 May 1979	3 May 1979
49	"The Irish Connection"	8 May 1979	9 May 1979	10 May 1979
50	"The Irish Connection"	8 May 1979	9 May 1979	10 May 1979
51	"The Irish Connection"	8 May 1979	9 May 1979	10 May 1979
52	"Heart to Heart"	15 May 1979	16 May 1979	17 May 1979
53	"Heart to Heart"	15 May 1979	16 May 1979	17 May 1979
54	"Heart to Heart"	15 May 1979	16 May 1979	17 May 1979
55	"Betrayal of Trust"	22 May 1979	23 May 1979	24 May 1979
56	"Betrayal of Trust"	22 May 1979	23 May 1979	24 May 1979
57	"Betrayal of Trust"	22 May 1979	23 May 1979	24 May 1979
58	"Caroline"	27 December 1979	28 December 1979	-
59	"Caroline"	27 December 1979	28 December 1979	-

=== Series 9 ===
No. in series	Case	Part 1 air date	Part 2 air date	Part 3 air date
1	"Public Spending"	26 August 1980	27 August 1980	-
2	"Public Spending"	26 August 1980	27 August 1980	-

=== Series 10 ===
No. in series	Case	Part 1 air date	Part 2 air date	Part 3 air date
1	"Proof Spirits"	9 March 1981	10 March 1981	11 March 1981
2	"Proof Spirits"	9 March 1981	10 March 1981	11 March 1981
3	"Proof Spirits"	9 March 1981	10 March 1981	11 March 1981
4	"Foul Play"	16 March 1981	17 March 1981	18 March 1981
5	"Foul Play"	16 March 1981	17 March 1981	18 March 1981
6	"Foul Play"	16 March 1981	17 March 1981	18 March 1981
7	"Freedom to Incite"	23 March 1981	24 March 1981	25 March 1981
8	"Freedom to Incite"	23 March 1981	24 March 1981	25 March 1981
9	"Freedom to Incite"	23 March 1981	24 March 1981	25 March 1981
10	"Hen Party"	30 March 1981	31 March 1981	1 April 1981
11	"Hen Party"	30 March 1981	31 March 1981	1 April 1981
12	"Hen Party"	30 March 1981	31 March 1981	1 April 1981
13	"Leonora"	6 April 1981	7 April 1981	8 April 1981
14	"Leonora"	6 April 1981	7 April 1981	8 April 1981
15	"Leonora"	6 April 1981	7 April 1981	8 April 1981
16	"Embers"	13 April 1981	14 April 1981	15 April 1981
17	"Embers"	13 April 1981	14 April 1981	15 April 1981
18	"Embers"	13 April 1981	14 April 1981	15 April 1981
19	"The Merry Widow"	21 April 1981	22 April 1981	-
20	"The Merry Widow"	21 April 1981	22 April 1981	-
21	"Cold Turkey"	4 May 1981	5 May 1981	-
22	"Cold Turkey"	4 May 1981	5 May 1981	-

=== Series 11 ===
No. in series	Case	Part 1 air date	Part 2 air date	Part 3 air date
1	"Talking to the Enemy"	23 March 1982	24 March 1982	25 March 1982
2	"Talking to the Enemy"	23 March 1982	24 March 1982	25 March 1982
3	"Talking to the Enemy"	23 March 1982	24 March 1982	25 March 1982
4	"Resurrection Woman"	30 March 1982	31 March 1982	1 April 1982
5	"Resurrection Woman"	30 March 1982	31 March 1982	1 April 1982
6	"Resurrection Woman"	30 March 1982	31 March 1982	1 April 1982
7	"Ignorance in the Field"	6 April 1982	7 April 1982	8 April 1982
8	"Ignorance in the Field"	6 April 1982	7 April 1982	8 April 1982
9	"Ignorance in the Field"	6 April 1982	7 April 1982	8 April 1982
10	"On the Defensive"	13 April 1982	14 April 1982	15 April 1982
11	"On the Defensive"	13 April 1982	14 April 1982	15 April 1982
12	"On the Defensive"	13 April 1982	14 April 1982	15 April 1982
13	"Fair Play"	20 April 1982	21 April 1982	22 April 1982
14	"Fair Play"	20 April 1982	21 April 1982	22 April 1982
15	"Fair Play"	20 April 1982	21 April 1982	22 April 1982
16	"Peanuts"	27 April 1982	28 April 1982	29 April 1982
17	"Peanuts"	27 April 1982	28 April 1982	29 April 1982
18	"Peanuts"	27 April 1982	28 April 1982	29 April 1982
19	"Face Value"	4 May 1982	5 May 1982	6 May 1982
20	"Face Value"	4 May 1982	5 May 1982	6 May 1982
21	"Face Value"	4 May 1982	5 May 1982	6 May 1982
22	"Wrecker"	11 May 1982	12 May 1982	13 May 1982
23	"Wrecker"	11 May 1982	12 May 1982	13 May 1982
24	"Wrecker"	11 May 1982	12 May 1982	13 May 1982
25	"Window Shopping"	18 May 1982	19 May 1982	20 May 1982
26	"Window Shopping"	18 May 1982	19 May 1982	20 May 1982
27	"Window Shopping"	18 May 1982	19 May 1982	20 May 1982
28	"Soldier, Soldier"	25 May 1982	26 May 1982	27 May 1982
29	"Soldier, Soldier"	25 May 1982	26 May 1982	27 May 1982
30	"Soldier, Soldier"	25 May 1982	26 May 1982	27 May 1982
31	"Too Bad for Tobias"	1 June 1982	2 June 1982	3 June 1982
32	"Too Bad for Tobias"	1 June 1982	2 June 1982	3 June 1982
33	"Too Bad for Tobias"	1 June 1982	2 June 1982	3 June 1982
34	"A Candidate for the Alliance"	8 June 1982	9 June 1982	10 June 1982
35	"A Candidate for the Alliance"	8 June 1982	9 June 1982	10 June 1982
36	"A Candidate for the Alliance"	8 June 1982	9 June 1982	10 June 1982
37	"The Fiddling Connection"	15 June 1982	16 June 1982	17 June 1982
38	"The Fiddling Connection"	15 June 1982	16 June 1982	17 June 1982
39	"The Fiddling Connection"	15 June 1982	16 June 1982	17 June 1982

=== Series 12 ===
No. in series	Case	Part 1 air date	Part 2 air date	Part 3 air date
1	"Brainwashed"	4 January 1983	5 January 1983	6 January 1983
2	"Brainwashed"	4 January 1983	5 January 1983	6 January 1983
3	"Brainwashed"	4 January 1983	5 January 1983	6 January 1983
4	"Seconds Away"	11 January 1983	12 January 1983	13 January 1983
5	"Seconds Away"	11 January 1983	12 January 1983	13 January 1983
6	"Seconds Away"	11 January 1983	12 January 1983	13 January 1983
7	"None of Your Business"	18 January 1983	19 January 1983	20 January 1983
8	"None of Your Business"	18 January 1983	19 January 1983	20 January 1983
9	"None of Your Business"	18 January 1983	19 January 1983	20 January 1983
10	"Night Fever"	25 January 1983	26 January 1983	27 January 1983
11	"Night Fever"	25 January 1983	26 January 1983	27 January 1983
12	"Night Fever"	25 January 1983	26 January 1983	27 January 1983
13	"A Black and White Case"	1 February 1983	2 February 1983	3 February 1983
14	"A Black and White Case"	1 February 1983	2 February 1983	3 February 1983
15	"A Black and White Case"	1 February 1983	2 February 1983	3 February 1983
16	"Personal Credit"	8 February 1983	9 February 1983	10 February 1983
17	"Personal Credit"	8 February 1983	9 February 1983	10 February 1983
18	"Personal Credit"	8 February 1983	9 February 1983	10 February 1983
19	"Fighting Fire with Fire"	15 February 1983	16 February 1983	17 February 1983
20	"Fighting Fire with Fire"	15 February 1983	16 February 1983	17 February 1983
21	"Fighting Fire with Fire"	15 February 1983	16 February 1983	17 February 1983
22	"A Proper Man"	22 February 1983	23 February 1983	24 February 1983
23	"A Proper Man"	22 February 1983	23 February 1983	24 February 1983
24	"A Proper Man"	22 February 1983	23 February 1983	24 February 1983
25	"Told in Silence"	8 March 1983	9 March 1983	10 March 1983
26	"Told in Silence"	8 March 1983	9 March 1983	10 March 1983
27	"Told in Silence"	8 March 1983	9 March 1983	10 March 1983
28	"Mother's Boy"	15 March 1983	16 March 1983	17 March 1983
29	"Mother's Boy"	15 March 1983	16 March 1983	17 March 1983
30	"Mother's Boy"	15 March 1983	16 March 1983	17 March 1983
31	"Living in Sin?"	22 March 1983	23 March 1983	24 March 1983
32	"Living in Sin?"	22 March 1983	23 March 1983	24 March 1983
33	"Living in Sin?"	22 March 1983	23 March 1983	24 March 1983
34	"A Matter of Trust"	29 March 1983	30 March 1983	31 March 1983
35	"A Matter of Trust"	29 March 1983	30 March 1983	31 March 1983
36	"A Matter of Trust"	29 March 1983	30 March 1983	31 March 1983
37	"A Sword in the Hand of David"	5 April 1983	6 April 1983	7 April 1983
38	"A Sword in the Hand of David"	5 April 1983	6 April 1983	7 April 1983
39	"A Sword in the Hand of David"	5 April 1983	6 April 1983	7 April 1983

=== Series 13 ===
No. in series	Case	Part 1 air date	Part 2 air date	Part 3 air date
1	"Gingerbread Girl"	3 January 1984	4 January 1984	5 January 1984
2	"Gingerbread Girl"	3 January 1984	4 January 1984	5 January 1984
3	"Gingerbread Girl"	3 January 1984	4 January 1984	5 January 1984
4	"Oddball"	10 January 1984	11 January 1984	12 January 1984
5	"Oddball"	10 January 1984	11 January 1984	12 January 1984
6	"Oddball"	10 January 1984	11 January 1984	12 January 1984
7	"The Son of His Father"	17 January 1984	18 January 1984	19 January 1984
8	"The Son of His Father"	17 January 1984	18 January 1984	19 January 1984
9	"The Son of His Father"	17 January 1984	18 January 1984	19 January 1984
10	"Whisper Who Dares"	24 January 1984	25 January 1984	26 January 1984
11	"Whisper Who Dares"	24 January 1984	25 January 1984	26 January 1984
12	"Whisper Who Dares"	24 January 1984	25 January 1984	26 January 1984
13	"Citizens"	31 January 1984	1 February 1984	2 February 1984
14	"Citizens"	31 January 1984	1 February 1984	2 February 1984
15	"Citizens"	31 January 1984	1 February 1984	2 February 1984
17	"Dirty Washing"	5 February 1984	6 February 1984	7 February 1984
18	"Dirty Washing"	5 February 1984	6 February 1984	7 February 1984
19	"Dirty Washing"	5 February 1984	6 February 1984	7 February 1984
19	"Her Father's Daughter"	13 February 1984	14 February 1984	15 February 1984
20	"Her Father's Daughter"	13 February 1984	14 February 1984	15 February 1984
21	"Her Father's Daughter"	13 February 1984	14 February 1984	15 February 1984
22	"There Was an Old Woman"	21 February 1984	22 February 1984	23 February 1984
23	"There Was an Old Woman"	21 February 1984	22 February 1984	23 February 1984
24	"There Was an Old Woman"	21 February 1984	22 February 1984	23 February 1984
25	"Burnt Futures"	28 February 1984	29 February 1984	1 March 1984
26	"Burnt Futures"	28 February 1984	29 February 1984	1 March 1984
27	"Burnt Futures"	28 February 1984	29 February 1984	1 March 1984
28	"Mother Figures"	6 March 1984	7 March 1984	8 March 1984
29	"Mother Figures"	6 March 1984	7 March 1984	8 March 1984
30	"Mother Figures"	6 March 1984	7 March 1984	8 March 1984
31	"Big Deal"	13 March 1984	14 March 1984	15 March 1984
32	"Big Deal"	13 March 1984	14 March 1984	15 March 1984
33	"Big Deal"	13 March 1984	14 March 1984	15 March 1984
34	"Love and War"	20 March 1984	21 March 1984	22 March 1984
35	"Love and War"	20 March 1984	21 March 1984	22 March 1984
36	"Love and War"	20 March 1984	21 March 1984	22 March 1984
37	"Paki Basher"	27 March 1984	28 March 1984	29 March 1984
38	"Paki Basher"	27 March 1984	28 March 1984	29 March 1984
39	"Paki Basher"	27 March 1984	28 March 1984	29 March 1984

=== Unaired episodes ===
No.	Case
1	"Doctor's Neglect? Simpson v Rudkin General Hospital Management Board"
2	"Doctor's Neglect? Simpson v Rudkin General Hospital Management Board"
3	"Doctor's Neglect? Simpson v Rudkin General Hospital Management Board"
1	"Traffic Warden's Daughter"
2	"Traffic Warden's Daughter"
3	"Traffic Warden's Daughter"
1	"A Case for Justice – A Party to Crime"
2	"A Case for Justice – A Party to Crime"
3	"A Case for Justice – A Party to Crime"
Produced after the 1981 story "Cold Turkey"; never screened on television or released on DVD.

== Reception ==
=== Critical response ===
Jon E. Lewis and Penny Stempel described Crown Court as a "quintessence of 70s afternoon drama", noting that it "languidly but effectively covered surprisingly substantial topics".

Laurence Marcus of Television Heaven called the series as a "wonderful opportunity to observe the British justice system in a series that was shot with an authenticity rarely seen in more recent productions".
