= Mike Read =

English radio presenter and musician (born 1947)

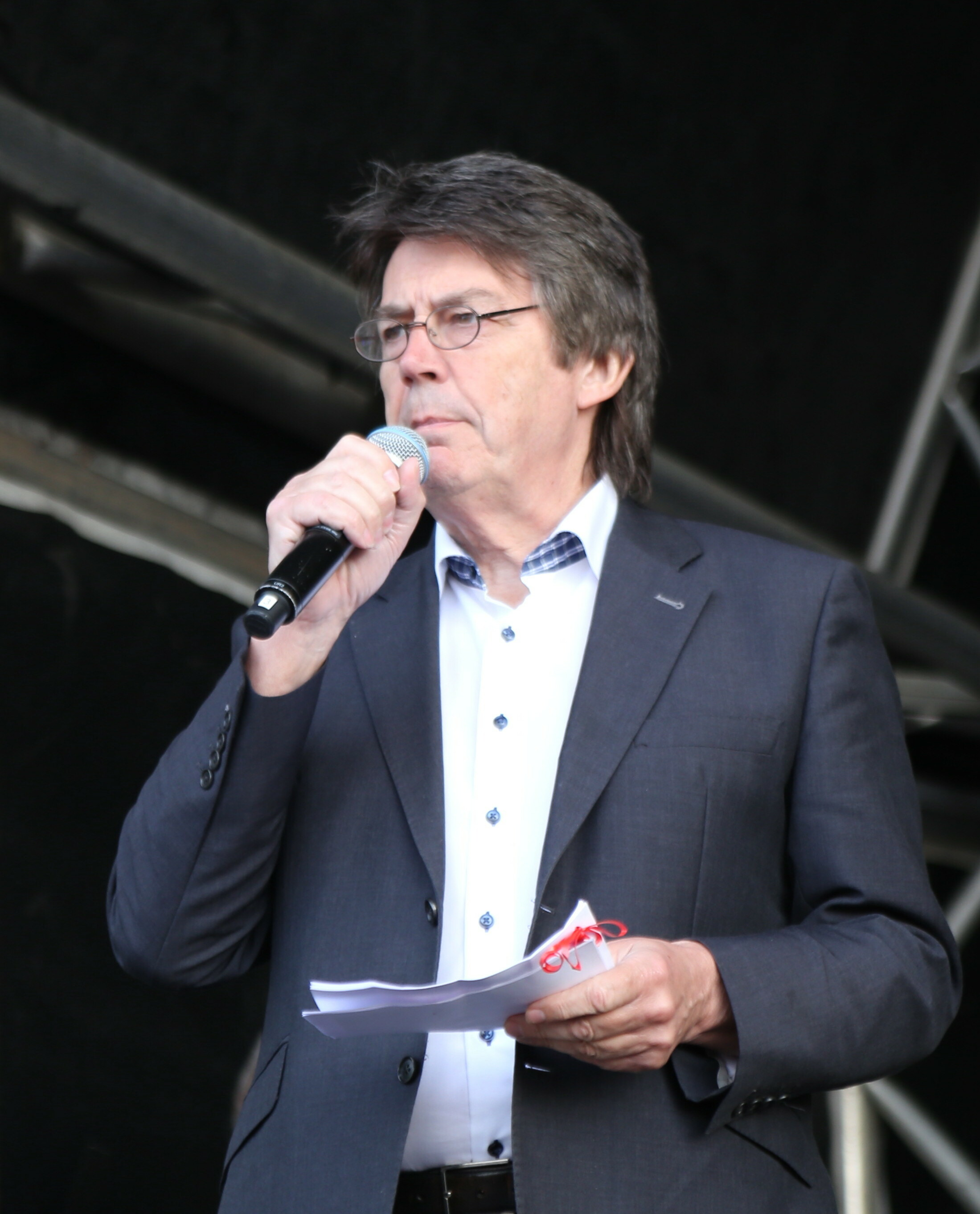
- Read in 2013
- Born: Michael David Kenneth Read; 1 March 1947 (age 79); Bury, Lancashire, England
- Occupations: Radio DJ; writer; journalist; television presenter
- Years active: 1976–present
- Known for: Saturday Superstore; BBC Radio 1; Top of the Pops; Pop Quiz

Michael David Kenneth Read (born 1 March 1947) is an English radio disc jockey, writer, journalist and television presenter.

Read has been a broadcaster since 1976, best known for having been a DJ with BBC Radio 1, and television host for music chart series Top of the Pops, children's programme Saturday Superstore and music panel game Pop Quiz. He is also a prolific author, having written over 50 books, including his autobiography, Seize the Day. Read currently hosts The Heritage Chart Show on various radio stations and Talking Pictures TV. He also co-hosts The Footage Detectives with Talking Pictures TV founder Noel Cronin.

== Early life ==
Michael David Kenneth Read was born 1 March 1947 in Bury, north of Manchester, the only child of a publican. The family moved from Manchester to Walton-on-Thames, Surrey, when he was an infant. He attended Woking Grammar School followed by a sixth-form college. Later, Read worked as an estate agent, and recorded under various names, including Mickey Manchester, The Trainspotters and The Rock-Olas.

== Broadcasting career ==
Read's professional broadcasting career began in March 1976 at Reading's Radio 210, where he co-hosted a slot with Steve Wright – entitled Read and Wright – before joining Radio Luxembourg late in 1977. Read joined Radio 1 in November 1978 and was soon presenting the night-time programme before the slot fronted by John Peel; here, Read championed new groups and featured live sessions. On 5 January 1981, he took over Radio 1 Breakfast.

On 11 January 1984, Read suddenly interrupted broadcasting the Frankie Goes to Hollywood song "Relax", halfway through playing the single, denouncing the lyrics as 'obscene'. Read has said this account of his intervention is a myth; the interruption of the record was solely for timing reasons, as he only had access in the studio to the longer 12" version. The BBC had already decided to ban the record from Top of the Pops, even though it subsequently reached No. 1 in the UK singles chart.

Following on from his five-year stint on Radio 1's breakfast slot, Read took over a Sunday morning programme in 1986. A year later, he moved to Saturday mornings, and also to a Sunday afternoon series, where he played classic tracks. In addition, he hosted Round Table and later went back to it as the renamed Singled Out on Friday evenings, in which musicians and disc jockeys would review new single releases.

Read's Saturday morning slot ended in September 1988, and his Sunday afternoon oldies series finished in January 1989, when Alan Freeman re-joined the station to host an oldies version of Pick of the Pops, which Read covered in November that year when Freeman was ill. From January 1989 to September 1990, Read presented a weekly series, The Mike Read Collection, (which was broadcast on Monday evenings) and remained on the Friday panel show Singled Out (which by then had gone back to its original name of Round Table); he remained in this slot until 1991.

=== After Radio 1 ===
Read left Radio 1 in 1991 and moved to Capital Gold in London, presenting his Mike Read Collection, which went out on a Sunday night, before taking on the weekday 'drive-time' show in mid-1992, where he remained until he left the station in late 1995. Read was heard on BBC Radio 2 in 1992 presenting special shows looking back at the career of Cliff Richard and playing his music. Read then joined Classic FM, where he presented a weekend series, and had a stint as weekday breakfast presenter starting in March 1996. The following year, he presented the networked 'breakfast show' on Classic Gold stations around the UK.

From September 1999, Read presented the breakfast show on Jazz FM in the north of England; then, in 2001, he joined Spirit FM in Chichester, initially presenting a Sunday slot from 10 am to 1 pm before moving to a weekday afternoon slot from 2 pm to 3 pm, playing music from various featured years.

Between 2003 and 2004, Read presented a Saturday morning slot on the Magic network around the UK. In May 2005, he became the weekday morning presenter on Big L 1395, a station modelled on the 1960s pirate radio station; he has also done occasional stints on Talksport. In November 2008, he took time out from Big L to present the 3 pm – 7 pm 'drive-time' show on KCFM (based in Hull) for a week (10–14 November), as cover for Shaun Tilley. Read became the third former Radio 1 disc jockey to broadcast on the station, along with Tony Blackburn and Paul Burnett.

In November 2009, Read began hosting a mid-morning slot on TotalStar in the West of England. Exactly a year later, Read had returned to Big L with a daily slot from 8 am to 12 pm, Monday-Friday. From July 2011, he hosted the Golden Hour on More Radio (Swindon and Wiltshire), formerly Total Star Wiltshire. Read was heard on Magic 1548 in the north of England, where he presented their weekend breakfast series, on Saturdays and Sundays from 7 am – 10 am, starting in April 2012. He also presented the afternoon slot on Monday to Friday on BBC Radio Berkshire between 1:00/3:00 pm and 4 pm until March 2015, and continued to host programmes for the station, including a Saturday afternoon slot during the summer of 2015.

In April 2018, Read was the first voice heard on the new internet radio station United DJs, where he hosted the station's breakfast slot on weekdays from 7-9am. He also hosted an additional weekly series for the station, entitled I Write the Songs. From November 2019, he hosted the weekday breakfast slot, from 7-10am, on London and south-east DAB station Vintage Music Radio for several months, but still presented occasional shows on United DJs and returned to the breakfast show there the following spring, staying until November 2020. Read left to join the new line-up of Nation Radio UK from 4 January 2021, and was replaced by Neil Fox in April.

=== Heritage Chart show ===
Since 15 November 2020, Read has hosted The Heritage Chart on Sunday afternoons on the Nation Radio network in the UK. The programme was on originally on United DJs Radio from 26 July to 8 November 2020. Dr Fox (Neil Fox) replaced Read on the United DJs version of the show after Read joined Nation Radio.

The Heritage Chart Show is syndicated on other selected radio stations across the UK and around the world. One such example is Enjoy Radio, an online station based in Greater Manchester who started carrying The Heritage Chart Show in early 2022. In January 2023, Regency Radio, an OFCOM-licensed station on the south coast broadcasting on DAB in the Brighton area, as well on app, online and on smart speaker took the Chart Show on Sunday nights from 5-7pm, the traditional time of the BBC Radio 1 and ILR chart shows.

==== Heritage Chart Radio ====
The Heritage Chart Show expanded from a weekly chart show to a full-time radio service, with presenters including former Yell! singer Daniel James, who has a show called Bangers and Chat, and rockabilly guitarist Darrel Higham. The station also picked up the radio broadcasts of Rewind TV's Stereo Underground programme, a show Richard Latto used to present on various BBC Local Radio stations and hired Dave Lee Travis for a weekly Sunday morning show starting in March 2025.

==== Other radio shows ====
On 12 April 2021, Read started hosting the breakfast show on Downforce Radio, broadcasting from 7-10am.

In 2022, Read started presenting his Afternoon Delight show on the Sussex station V2 Radio.

From 1 August 2022, Read continued his breakfast show, but also with an audience from Sunshine Radio Online, with a dual broadcast-type arrangement.

From 22 April 2024, Read started presenting the breakfast show on Regency Radio.

=== Television ===
Read combined his radio work with a second career as a television presenter. He hosted the Yorkshire Television children's series Pop Quest from 1977 to 1979; then, on BBC1, Read presented or co-presented 65 editions of the music chart series Top of the Pops from 9 November 1978 to 28 December 1989.

From 1982 to 1987, Read presented the BBC's Saturday morning children's programme Saturday Superstore, as well as the Saturday night music game show Pop Quiz, which regularly got audiences of 10 million and featured rock and pop stars answering music trivia questions; the series spawned board game and computer game spin-offs. The penultimate episode of Pop Quiz, in 1984, featured a face-off between pop bands Spandau Ballet and Duran Duran. The format was revived twice: firstly in 1994 by the BBC with Chris Tarrant as the host; and then in June 2008, a revamped Pop Quiz recorded without a studio audience and in a pub (rather than a television studio) in which the participants were members of the public, aired on Red TV; this was again hosted by Read. In 1994, he returned to Top of the Pops to host a one-off special for its anniversary. Later, in 1997, he presented the UK Gold television genre quiz Goldmaster in 1997.

In 2004, Read was one of the contestants recruited for the jungle-based ITV reality series I'm a Celebrity...Get Me Out of Here!, though his stay in the Australian outback was short-lived, as he was the first celebrity to be evicted by the viewing public. Read was among 10 former presenters who returned as guest co-presenters for the final edition of Top of the Pops, broadcast 30 July 2006 on BBC Two.

Read has also appeared as a regular newspaper reviewer for Sky News. In 2014, he appeared as himself in BBC Four spoof docudrama The Life of Rock with Brian Pern.

In 2021, he joined Talking Pictures TV founder Noel Cronin on the channel's archive programme The Footage Detectives, a series which discusses forgotten films and lost TV shows such as The Barnstormers from 1964.

As of 2022, The Heritage Chart Show with Mike Read is broadcast on Sundays, first by the Local TV network of channels at 7pm, and then by Talking Pictures TV as a late-night repeat. The programme is a pop music countdown of videos and live performances from veteran acts, such as Chesney Hawkes and Tight Fit, based on the chart broadcast on a number of community radio stations in the UK and abroad.

=== Song-writing ===
In 1979, Read wrote and performed the pop-punk song "High Rise" (upon which his Radio 1 intro jingle was subsequently based) under the guise of The Trainspotters, following this in 1980 with "My Town", by his next studio group, The Ghosts. Read then wrote lyrics to the theme (composed by Simon May) for the TRIC Award-winning Trainer; the resulting UK Top 30 single, "More to Life", was performed by Cliff Richard. In 1991, Read also provided a guest rap on "Radio Wall of Sound", UK Top 30 hit for Slade.

After his appearance on I'm a Celebrity... Get Me Out of Here!, Read recorded a charity single when he lyrically re-worked the Hank Mizell hit "Jungle Rock" and – as the Jungle Boys (with fellow I'm a Celebrity... Get Me Out of Here! contestants Neil 'Razor' Ruddock and Lord Brocket) – had a UK Top 30 hit single. The follow-up, which made the Top 75, was a new version of Mungo Jerry classic "In the Summertime". In 2005, Read's song "Grief Never Grows Old" featured on a charity recording in aid of victims of the 2004 tsunami. Performed by an ensemble of artists named One World Project, the single reached No. 4 in the UK singles chart.

Read has written music to accompany many poems written by John Betjeman. Thirty of these songs were recorded by artists including Cliff Richard, David Essex, Gene Pitney and Marc Almond for the 2006 various artists' album Words/Music, and subsequently re-released in 2008 as a double CD titled Sound of Poetry.

On 19 October 2011, Read was presented with a BASCA Gold Badge Award in recognition of his contribution to music.

=== Musicals ===
Read has staged a number of musicals, including Young Apollo (a musical about the life of Rupert Brooke); Oscar (a 2004 production about Oscar Wilde, which was derided by critics and closed after one performance); Great Expectations; A Christmas Carol; Cliff - The Musical (which closed after three months) and Ricky Nelson...Teenage Idol. Read took one of the lead roles in the Cliff musical, touring with it and appearing for a three-month run in the West End at the Prince of Wales Theatre. His production Betjeman (based on his musical settings of poems by Sir John Betjeman) has occasionally been staged for charities, including the Royal Marsden Hospital and Children With Leukaemia. Actors appearing in his musicals and shows have included Nyree Dawn Porter, Brian Glover, Colin Baker, Anton Rogers, Jeremy Irons, Alvin Stardust and Bernard Cribbins.

=== Books and poetry ===
Read was one of the founder editors of the UK chart reference series Guinness Book of British Hit Singles, and also co-wrote other Guinness music books.

Read's poetry books include The Aldermoor Poems, Elizabethan Dragonflies, A Room With Books and the latest, New Poems for Old Paintings. He has edited and supplied biographies for the two best-selling poetry books, 100 Favourite Poems and 100 Favourite Humorous Poems, and contributed to many of the titles in the series Poets' England. He has also written two crime novels. In 1997, he published Forever England: The Life of Rupert Brooke. In 2019 he published A Thousand Years of A London Street: Denmark Street.

=== Contemporary art ===
In October 2007, Read started to produce contemporary art, with a gallery of works in the medium of confectionery entitled Choc Art. The work includes recreations of album sleeves by the Beatles, his own take on the famous map of the London Underground, and works based on the paintings of L.S. Lowry.

== Personal life and ventures ==
=== Stalker ===
Read had a stalker who had changed her name to Blue Tulip Rose Read and believed that she was married to him. She was featured in a 1996 film made by Jaine Green for Channel 4, entitled I'm Your Number One Fan. Rose was one of the most candid interviewees in the film. She was filmed as she travelled to the offices of Classic FM, and as she wrote "love letters" to Read. The film stated that Rose had been writing obscene and threatening letters to Read for many years.

=== Political views ===
Having spoken three times at Conservative Party conferences, including entertaining guests at a conference dinner in 2006 with a ten-minute political rap, Read said that he was asked to run for the Conservative Party nomination for the London Mayoral elections in 2008. He subsequently announced that he was instead putting his energies behind the ultimately successful candidate, Boris Johnson.

On 21 July 2012, Read spoke at the UK Independence Party's South East regional Conference in Frimley, where he was also announced as a member of the party. Read later spoke at the UKIP 2012 Annual Conference at Birmingham Town Hall on 21 September.

Read wrote and recorded a song in support of the party, "UKIP Calypso", which was released in October 2014 as a single credited to the Independents. An online petition was filed by former Labour borough councillor Richard McKenzie in which he called Read's song "racist and offensive". Party leader Nigel Farage endorsed it and called for the party's supporters to download the song. Read adopted a faux-Jamaican accent, but said that it was "not remotely racist" to do so, saying: "It's a satire and a bit of fun. It's not terribly serious. It wouldn't have sounded very good sung in a Surrey accent." Debate over the single featured on Newsnight, with UKIP spokesman Winston McKenzie, himself of Caribbean origin, praising the song and likening it to adaptations of predominantly black musical styles by Elvis Presley and the Beatles, although the BBC Asian Network's Nihal was critical of it. Read withdrew the song from sale on 22 October 2014 and apologised "unreservedly" for the fact that it had "unintentionally caused offence". On 26 October 2014, the song reached number 44 on the UK singles chart.

=== The Rupert Brooke Society ===
In 1999, Read founded the Rupert Brooke Society of which he was chairman for a few years, as well as editing the society's twice-yearly magazine and creating a museum at The Orchard tea room in Grantchester.

Media offices
Preceded by Dave Lee Travis	BBC Radio 1 Breakfast Show Presenter; 1981–1986	Succeeded by Mike Smith
