= Pop Quiz =

British game show

- Genre: Game show
- Presented by: Mike Read (1981–84, 1994, 2008, 2011, 2016–17); Chris Tarrant (1994)
- Country of origin: United Kingdom
- Original language: English
- No. of series: 6
- No. of episodes: 62 (inc. 9 specials)

Production
- Running time: 30 minutes (1981–84, 1994, 2016–17); 60 minutes (2008, 2011)

Original release
- Network: BBC1 (1981–84, 1994); Red TV (2008); Vintage TV (2011); BBC Four (2016–17)
- Release: 4 July 1981 – 4 January 2017

Pop Quiz is a British television panel game show that originally aired on BBC1 from 4 July 1981 to 28 December 1984 with a Top of the Pops special on 4 January 1994 hosted by Mike Read. It was then revived from 21 May to 9 July 1994 on the same channel but this time hosted by Chris Tarrant. It was revived again on Red TV from 14 June to 30 August 2008 with Mike Read returning as host; he also hosted two specials on BBC Four in December 2016 and January 2017.

== Format ==
The teams are made up of three pop stars with one acting as team captain, although no permanent team captains. Guests who have appeared as captains include Bev Bevan, Dave Edmunds, Robert Plant, Phil Lynott, Bob Geldof, Morrissey, Roger Taylor, Cliff Richard, Midge Ure, George Michael, John Taylor, Phil Collins, David Gilmour, Dave Gahan and Ian Gillan. Occasionally, non-musical or music-associated guests such as Paula Yates, John Peel, or the double act of Syd Little and Eddie Large also appeared as guests.

The Red TV version featured members of the public instead of celebrities.

=== Rounds ===
The show has both team and individual rounds. The individual rounds see each player given a song then asked a question about the song (like a guest player on the recording), asked to identify three different artists who sang the same song in the correct order, or asked to name a song where a certain lyric appears. Team rounds include a naming a list of number one hits by a group, a compilation of songs of a particular theme where the teams guess the artist, or identifying a mystery guest from a clip (as in A Question of Sport), along with identifying the song playing backwards over the clip. Each episode ended with a quick-fire round of music trivia questions.

== Transmissions ==
=== Series ===
| Series | Start date | End date | Episodes |
|---|---|---|---|
| 1 | 4 July 1981 | 29 August 1981 | 8 |
| 2 | 3 April 1982 | 19 June 1982 | 11 |
| 3 | 9 April 1983 | 25 June 1983 | 11 |
| 4 | 26 May 1984 | 9 October 1984 | 12 |
| 5 | 21 May 1994 | 9 July 1994 | 8 |
| 6 | 14 June 2008 | 30 August 2008 | 12 |

=== Specials ===
| Date | Entitle |
|---|---|
| 29 December 1981 | Christmas Special |
| 28 December 1982 | Christmas Special |
| 24 December 1983 | Christmas Special |
| 24 December 1984 | Christmas Special |
| 28 December 1984 | Duran Duran vs. Spandau Ballet |
| 4 January 1994 | Top of the Pops 30th Anniversary Special |
| 15 December 2011 | The Vintage Christmas Pop Quiz |
| 28 December 2016 | The Comeback (Part 1) |
| 4 January 2017 | The Comeback (Part 2) |

== Theme tune ==
The theme tune is called "The Saturn Stomp" and was composed by Howard Massey, it was released as a single in 1981. "The Saturn Stomp" was rerecorded for the fourth series, and rearranged by Marc Sylvan for the 2016 specials.
