= Thekla Roth =

British model and actress

- Born: Lancaster, England
- Occupations: Model; television personality; actress

Thekla Roth is a British model, television personality and actress born in Lancaster, England. Her early work was predominantly modelling; this included magazines such as FHM, Maxim, Ice, People and more recent work includes TV and film such as Brit Hits - Celebrity Stars at Work, Clubbing to Death, Clever V Stupid.

== Early modeling career ==
Roth studied Exercise & Fitness, Sports Therapy before her first film work: a stunt role for the film Coyote Ugly. Splitting her time between Los Angeles and London her early modeling work included the music videos Sonique Feels So Good and Benny Benassi Satisfaction. Roth has modeled for magazines such as FHM, Maxim, Ice, Nuts, Arena, People, Bizarre and Love It.

== Live events and multimedia ==
Roth has hosted live events such as Miss Earth, Max Power Live and Xbox Live. International technology shows include Brainstorm and DigiWarp (Netherlands). This work lead her to be approached by Ubisoft who went on to create a virtual character based on her in their 2005 video game 187 Ride or Die on the back of which she made numerous personal appearances and international magazine covers. Roth also posed for Playboy and was a UK Playboy Cyber Girl.

== Television, film and accolades ==
Roth filmed for the 2007 film remake of Baywatch (unreleased), and Isabella in Dave Courtney film Clubbing to Death 2007. Television work included Red TV's Brit Hits, British reality TV show Celebrity Stars at Work (2007/2008) that documented Roth's working life by having a camera crew follow her work on a day-to-day basis. Roth appeared on BBC Three Clever V Stupid (2009). Awards include Miss Hot Import Nights 2005 and Supermodel of the Year 2007.
