= Sikh Channel =

- Sikh Channel logo
- Broadcast area: International

Ownership
- Owner: Sikh Channel Community Interest Company Limited

History
- Launched: 13 April 2009
- Replaced: Brit Hits

Links
- Website: www.sikhchannel.tv

Availability

Streaming media
- Sikhchannel.tv: Watch live

The Sikh Channel is a United Kingdom based, free-to-air, Sikhi-focused satellite television channel. It's broadcast across Europe via satellite television, in Canada and is also streamed live on the internet. The Sikh Channel began broadcasting on 13 April 2009 on UK Sky channel 840, replacing Brit Hits. The Sikh Channel primarily focuses on education and religious programming for the Sikh community. Its headquarters operate from a studio in the Aston area of Birmingham.

== History ==
The Sikh Channel was founded by Davinder Singh Bal in April 2009 by TV Legal Limited. TV Legal formed The Sikh Channel Community Broadcasting Company Limited to accept donations, which are used to pay for the broadcasting and programming expenses. The Sikh Channel Community Broadcasting Company Limited became a registered Community Interest Company (CIC) on 25 September 2009, and later a registered charity on 2 June 2010. In December 2012, TV Legal Limited transferred the channel's television broadcast licence to the Sikh Channel Community Interest Company Limited.

The Sikh Channel organised a demonstration on so-called ‘Dastar Day’ to obtain respect for the turban, following the introduction of manual checks at airports decided by the European Union, in front of the Palace of Westminster on September 25, 2011.

On 18 April 2013, the channel launched in Canada through an exclusive licensing agreement with the Asian Television Network as 'ATN Sikh Channel'.

== See also ==
- Brit Hits
- Sikhism in England
- Sikhism in United Kingdom
