= Cliff – The Musical =

Musical written by Mike Read and Trevor Payne

Cliff – The Musical was a musical based on the life of Sir Cliff Richard which was staged at The Prince of Wales Theatre, London from 17 March 2003 to June 2003. The show was written by Mike Read and Trevor Payne, with Payne directing. Four performers played the part of Richard.

== Reception ==
The show was not well received by the critics with Rhoda Koenig writing in The Independent: "The high point is 'pants'" referring to the final number, in which each of the four Cliffs "tosses a pair of unworn white boxer shorts to the screaming crowd – a moment that not only ends but sums up Cliff The Musical."

The BBC's critic Mark Shenton wrote: "I wish I was in it myself, Sir Cliff Richard is quoted saying on the posters. But he must have said that before he actually saw this truly terrible tribute show" and referred to it as "Witless, insulting, clumsily thrown together; the new Cliff Richard tribute show is a long night at the theatre".
