= UKIP Calypso =

Single by The Independents
- Genre: Calypso
- Songwriter: Mike Read

"UKIP Calypso" is a 2014 calypso single by the English radio DJ Mike Read released under the name of The Independents. The single was released to raise money for charity and was endorsed by the UK Independence Party (UKIP). The song reached 44 in the UK singles charts and number 1 on the UK Indie Chart.

== History ==
"UKIP Calypso" was originally created to be performed by Read at a UKIP dinner. The song was well received at the dinner and it was suggested that Read should release it as a single. Shortly after Read released it, the song received endorsement from UKIP leader Nigel Farage, whom the song refers to as the new Prime Minister. Shortly after it was released, Lord Prescott and David Lammy criticised the song because Read performed it with a Caribbean accent, to which Read responded, "you can't sing a calypso with a Surrey accent". The song also drew allegations of racism for the verse: "The leaders committed a cardinal sin / Open the borders let them all come in / Illegal immigrants in every town / Stand up and be counted Blair and Brown." Read initially responded that it was political satire but later withdrew the song and apologised for any unintentional offence. A debate over the song was featured on the BBC's Newsnight programme where UKIP spokesman Winston McKenzie, himself of Caribbean origin, praised the song and likened it to Elvis Presley and The Beatles' adaptation of predominantly black musical styles, while BBC Asian Network's DJ Nihal was critical of it, stating "that it made my ears vomit."

UKIP announced that half of the proceeds of UKIP Calypso would go to the British Red Cross as part of their appeal against Ebola. However, the Red Cross declined the donation stating: "As a neutral organisation, we cannot benefit from something which overtly supports one political party." UKIP stated that they were disappointed about it and claimed that the Red Cross was putting politics ahead of saving lives.

== Charts ==
"UKIP Calypso" was released on Angel Air Records, a UK independent label, and Farage put out an appeal for people to make it a number one hit. Despite this, it only managed number 44 on the UK Singles Chart on Sunday 26 October 2014, falling from number 21 in the midweek charts. UKIP blamed "synthetic outrage" for Read withdrawing the song from sale earlier that week. It charted at number 1 on the UK Indie Charts released on the same day.
