= Jaine Green =

British documentary filmmaker

- Born: London, United Kingdom
- Occupations: Artist, Documentary film maker, stand-up comedian, film producer

Jaine Green, is a UK Artist and former documentary maker and Stand-up comedian. She was Head of Content at Discover.film, a short film distribution platform and is currently an adviser on systems for judging the quality of creative content at AI Aware, a company that is building products to detect AI generated images and videos.

Her films deal with often difficult taboo social issues involving women in society such as when she was the first person to show a clitoris on UK national television. Green has made more than 50 diverse films and commercials and also directed theatre. Her West End debut was a production of Lip Service, a dark comedy about three women taking calls for a sex line. She won the Best Docu-Soap award at the National TV Awards and her short film, Cherry Cake, was an official selection at the 34th Vancouver International Film Festival; a finalist for the Best Narrative Short award at the 24th St Louis Film Festival; nominated for Best International Short Film at the 25th International Flickerfest Festival. and a Jury Selection at the 27th Palm Springs Film Festival.

== Personal life ==
She was born in London, studied in Chichester and currently lives in Hastings on the south coast of England. Her background is unconventional for a film director as she worked as a hairdresser and stand-up comedian, before winning a place on ITV's Metroland, a series for first time directors, with I have the gift, a documentary film about Leon, a postman in Brixton who claims to have abilities of psychic gifts and provides both physical and spiritual support.

Green is the mother of spoken word artist and author Laura Dockrill.

== Career ==
Green has been making controversial films since 1996, when one of her first documentaries I'm Your Number One Fan (C4) split the critics. Victor Lewis-Smith stated that it "transcended the documentary format" due to its opening sequence shot on Super 8 film and was "a true work of art that deserves to win every award it's entered for", but Jim Shelley thought it was exploitative. The film followed three stalkers quietly going about their daily business as they harassed the likes of Princess Diana. German doctor Klaus Wagner believed Princess Diana was at the centre of a hate campaign by the Queen. Blue Tulip Rose Read is seen crowing like a cockerel as she pursues DJ Mike Read.

The film attracted a cult following. The Evening Standard began selling 'Mrs Read teeshirts', and comedy series The League of Gentlemen used direct quotes from the film in newspaper signs, seen around Royston Vasey in various episodes of the first series. The writing on these signs include "Ed Stewart's breath stinks", "Mike Read's breath is beautiful" and "Mike Read made me better".

The social roles of women and their experiences within society are themes in a number of Green's other documentaries. In 2008, Female Hoarders examined the psychology behind compulsive hoarding by women. An earlier film Sleeping with the Enemy, distributed by the BBC, examined the impact of religious differences on families and included a Jewish woman born in a Nazi hospital in World War II, a Muslim woman forcibly separated from her Christian husband in Sarayevo by the Yugoslavian conflicts of the early 1990s and a committed Hindu married to a Church of England vicar.

=== As filmmaker ===
As well as documentaries exploring ethical dilemmas and female social roles, Green has made a number of films about celebrities and their need to keep aspects of their lives hidden from their fans. In Jennifer Lopez – Behind the Behind, a number of previously secret aspects of Lopez's life were revealed including that her ex-teacher who was nearly twice her age became her live-in lover and that she was privately educated and from an affluent neighbourhood rather than having the poor background that she claimed. The documentary The Truth About Take That explored the compromises that the boy band had to make when famous. The film examined the reasons why sexuality matters to fans and how it can affect sales in the music industry.

Green made a party political broadcast for the breakaway Pro-Euro Conservative Party which was declared as controversial by both The Guardian and The Independent. It was said that it would lead to a change in future campaigns where a more US-style 'gloves off approach' would likely be adopted. The broadcast contained a portrayal of William Hague as a tramp.

A more mainstream production was Simon Rattle – Moving On a year-long production for the BBC which followed Rattle, who was at the time Britain's best known conductor in his final year at the CBSO. In the film, Rattle criticised the Labour Government for their policy towards arts funding and announced plans to leave the UK. He subsequently moved to Germany to conduct the Berlin Philharmonic.

In recent years, documentaries have included The Real Witch Project, Middle Aged Mummy’s Boys, and Tourette’s on the Job (finalist for BAFTA/MHMA). All of these documentaries have as a common theme the sympathetic portrayal of people who are for various reasons struggling with the behaviours exhibited by mainstream society. For example, Tourette's on the Job features Brad Cohen, who was branded a troublemaker in school and punished by his teachers for the tics and barking noises that were caused by his Tourette's.

In 2014 Green wrote, directed and produced a short, independently funded drama, Cherry Cake, which has actors Matthew Kelly and Eve Pearce. The film is set in rural England and challenges the audiences expectations of what it is to be elderly with the character of 86-year old Ingrid. In 2015 Green used Kickstarter to raise money for this project.

=== As producer ===
In 2009, Green was executive producer on Channel 4's My Monkey Baby, about people who treat monkeys as children who don't grow up which provoked a debate about the ethics of keeping monkeys as pets. Lori and Jim Johnson, interviewed in the documentary, consider Jessy, a Capuchin monkey, to be their child to such a degree that Jim states that, 'If I hear anyone call her a monkey I throw a fit. She's my daughter, 100%'. The film reveals the family traumas that underpin this behaviour as Lori hadn't had contact with any of her six children for five years and another participant, Mary-Lynn, had had to have a hysterectomy at a young age.

Another example of a film that Green produced that looks at 'outsiders' is Love in Rimini which features the love lives of straight Italian men in relationships with transsexuals. It explores how men justify their attraction to a transsexual and how this fits into straight sexual identity, particularly in the context of machismo in Italian society.

Green echoed her earlier interest in the paranormal as series producer in 2009 for Psychic Academy, where Tony Stockwell, who claims to have demonstrated psychic abilities as a child, attempts to identify members of the public who have the ability to perceive information hidden from the normal senses through extrasensory perception (ESP) or have the necessary intuitive processes to produce the appearance of such abilities.

In 2012, she was series producer for Secret Millionaire in the UK which won Best Docu-Soap at the National Reality TV Awards 2012 by The National Reality TV Academy.

From 2015 to 2016, Jaine Green was the global Show Runner for UnderCover Angel, a ten part series for National Geographic Channel.

== Awards ==
- Finalist BAFTA Mental Health Awards.
- Finalist, Best Narrative Short, St Louis International Film Festival.
- Jury Selection, 27th Palm Springs International Film Festival.
- Official Selection, 34th Vancouver International Film Festival.
- Won Best Docu-Soap at National TV Awards.
- Won Italian Pomo d'oro.
