= Brit Hits =

British TV channel

- Country: United Kingdom

Ownership
- Owner: TV Legal Limited

History
- Launched: 20 February 2006
- Closed: 13 April 2009
- Replaced by: Sikh Channel
- Former names: Legal TV (2006–07); Red TV (2007–08)

Links
- Website: brithits.tv

Brit Hits is a British television channel that was launched on 20 February 2006. It was broadcast via the Sky Digital satellite platform to the United Kingdom on channel 215.

The channel was formerly known as Legal TV and Red TV.

== History ==
Logo as Legal TV used from launch until 16 December 2007

When the channel launched as Legal TV, it adopted the motto "the law firm in your living room" and aimed its programmes at a lay audience. Legal advice given by the channel was of a general nature, compared by a senior director to "...advice that might be sourced from the CAB".

In July 2007, Consultant Commercial Lawyer, Jonathan (Jonny) Munro LL.B, became Producer and Presenter of programmes like 'Street Lawyer', 'Jonny & Rob Advise', 'Devil's Advocate'.

Along with the start of the YouTube culture, pressure for audiences and threats of legal action from the BBC, embryo formats of Live Arbitrations and 'Free speech' within live audiences were killed before any investment was put into the channel. Jonny Munro, former head of Legal TV, operated a Media & Law Firm JONRO Lawyers, deep in the English countryside, on the Buckinghamshire-Northamptonshire border. Most of LegalTV was recorded in and around Birmingham, and from studios in Aston, England. Jonny Munro concentrated his work in online broadcasting and the Sky Channel was handed to Sikh TV in 2010.

Legal TV was rebranded as Red TV on Monday 17 December 2007, and sought to expand on Legal TV's line-up of home-grown and USA-imported legal programming by introducing reality TV and lifestyle documentary shows. The channel's slogan was 'Close to Life'.

Red TV was relaunched as Brit Hits TV in December 2008. The channel moved EPG genres from entertainment to music, which is Channel 385.

Brit Hits targeted an audience between 16 and 45 years old, focusing most of its broadcast on new up-and-coming British acts, as well as older British artists.

In February 2009, Brit Hits started simulcasting Psychic TV, and also contained other non-related music programmes. It no longer showed music but also moved to Channel 215.

Brit Hits closed on 13 April 2009 and was replaced by The Sikh Channel.
