= The Complete Truth About De-Evolution =

1993 video album by Devo

Cover of 2003 Rhino Records DVD Release

The Complete Truth About De-Evolution was the third home video release by American new wave band Devo. It is a collection of Devo's music videos from 1976 to 1990. It was released on LaserDisc in 1993 by Voyager and on DVD by Rhino Records in 2003. MVD released a new version of the disc in 2014.

== Synopsis ==
The Complete Truth About De-Evolution contains almost all of Devo's music video output from 1976 to 1990. The DVD does not include two notable music videos: the first is "Theme from Doctor Detroit," the theme to the movie Doctor Detroit; the second is the Jimi Hendrix cover "R U Experienced?," which was removed due to protests from the Hendrix estate. The films are presented in roughly chronological order and are interspersed with clips from a promotional film Devo made with Pioneer in the 1980s to promote the LaserDisc format. The DVD also includes many bonus features such as a commentary track by band members Mark Mothersbaugh and Gerald Casale, an interview with Chuck Statler (who directed many of Devo's videos), live footage from early Devo performances, photo galleries and more. None of the live material from "The Men Who Make The Music" is included, nor is most of the storyline from "We're All Devo!"

== Film title ==
It is important to differentiate The Complete Truth About De-Evolution from The Truth About De-Evolution. The Truth About De-Evolution was a short film made by Devo in 1976 which included the videos for "Jocko Homo" and "Secret Agent Man". The Complete Truth About De-Evolution is the 1993 compilation of promotional videos.

== Track listing ==
Track order from the LaserDisc and Rhino DVD releases.

- Logos and Titles
- Devo Corporate Anthem (1979)
- In The Beginning Was The End: The Truth About De-Evolution (1976)
- (I Can't Get No) Satisfaction (1978)
- A word about LaserDiscs
- Come Back Jonee (1978)
- The Day My Baby Gave Me A Surprise (1979)
- It Takes A Worried Man (From the film Human Highway; opens with footage from Devo's home video release We're All Devo featuring Rod Rooter and his daughter, Donut) (1979)
- Whip It (1980)
- Girl U Want (1980)
- Freedom of Choice (1980)
- Another word about LaserDiscs
- Through Being Cool (1981)
- Love Without Anger (1981)
- Beautiful World (1981)
- Time Out for Fun (1982)
- Peek-a-Boo! (1982)
- That's Good (1982)
- More about LaserDiscs
- R U Experienced? (Does not appear on Rhino DVD) (1984)
- The final word about LaserDiscs
- Disco Dancer (1988)
- Post Post-Modern Man (1990)
- Post Post-Modern Man (Rocky Schenck remix) (1990)
- Credits
- Mongoloid (Bonus feature on Rhino DVD) (1977)

The track listing on the MVD release omits the Pioneer LaserDisc interstitials (reassigning them to one bonus segment), but restores "Theme from Doctor Detroit" (playing between "That's Good" and "Disco Dancer"). Track order is otherwise the same.

== Bonus material ==
Exclusive to the MVD DVD release is a lengthy roster of bonus material. Featured are the We're All Devo Big Entertainment segments featuring Rod Rooter, Donut, and Dr. Byrthfood and several minutes of live footage from the band's early, pre-Warner shows. Also present are written-word accounts from Casale and Mothersbaugh of the band's experiences with record labels and the recording of their first album, including photographs in automatic and manual slideshows. Promotions for The Men Who Make the Music and Devo Live 1980 DVDs are featured here also. "R U Experienced?" appears to be in the list, but it is simply the first few seconds of the video before the music starts, followed by a test card directing viewers to look for the full video online.

The DVD retains the commentary track from the LaserDisc release, however, as "Theme from Doctor Detroit" was not present on LaserDisc, there is no commentary for that track (a fact conveyed to the viewer by a speech synthesizer).

== Rhino Records DVD controversy ==
The Rhino Records DVD released in 2000 received much criticism from fans of the band. First, because of the aforementioned omission of the video for "Are You Experienced?". A comment on the back cover of the DVD addresses this: "DEVO regrets that 'R U Experienced?' is not included in the program. The current executors of the Jimi Hendrix estate were determined to prove to us the old adage - 'To seek permission is to seek denial'." Other criticisms focused on the relatively poor mastering job. For example, Rhino simply recorded the gallery segments from the LaserDisc without making them seekable galleries. Similarly, each video's title screen was simply copied from the original LaserDisc, which means many of the chapter numbers listed on the title screens bear no relation to their chapter numbers on the DVD. Furthermore, there had been many delays in the DVD's release. However, the Rhino DVD does include the rare "Mongoloid," video by Bruce Conner.
