= Characters in Devo music videos =

In Devo's music videos, early concerts, literature, and short films, the band created a pastiche and parody of the real world via the idea of "Spudland". Many characters and concepts reoccur in different media.

== Characters ==
=== Booji Boy ===
Played by Mark Mothersbaugh, Booji is considered the infantile spirit of Devolution. He first appeared in The Truth About De-Evolution as a member of the performing band during the "Secret Agent Man" segment. He is the son of General Boy.

=== General Boy ===
General Boy, played by Robert Mothersbaugh, Sr., father of Mark and Bob Mothersbaugh, serves as a representation and parody of authority figures, though General Boy is on the side of Devo. He made his first appearance in The Truth About De-Evolution.

=== Chinaman ===
The Chinaman, played by Gerald Casale, is an embodiment of the stereotypical wise Asian master. He does not appear in music videos, except a brief shot in "Secret Agent Man". He wrote the introduction to Booji Boy's book My Struggle. Chinaman speaks the lyrics to "Social Fools" in the studio/demo version of "Somewhere With Devo".

=== Soo Bawlz ===
Played by Toni Basil. She is the girlfriend of Chinaman. Her only appearances were in a handful of early live performances. She also had her own song "Soo Bawlz", which appears on the B-Side of the Devo single release of "Secret Agent Man".

=== Rodney Ethan Rooter (a.k.a. "Rod The Man") ===
A parody of music executives, Rod Rooter, played by Michael W. Schwartz, serves as a higher-up in Big Entertainment, the entertainment conglomerate that owns Devo. His relationship with the band is extremely antagonistic. He sees Devo as a tool for marketing, and is dismissive of their artistic goals. We're All Devo implies that there is an incestual relationship between him and his daughter Donut Rooter.

=== Floyd & Boyd Kalimba ===
From the Mac/PC game Adventures of the Smart Patrol. Floyd and Boyd are Rod Rooter's trendy twin henchmen. They are also featured in My Struggle.

=== Donut Rooter ===
Daughter of Rod Rooter. Seemingly obsessed with keeping within ever-changing fashion trends. Played in We're All Devo by Laraine Newman. Played by Deborah Driggs in the promotional music video for Post-Post Modern Man.

=== Daddy Know-It-All ===
The embodiment of all that is corporate evil. He is Rod Rooter's boss, and Rod can be seen ingratiating himself to him in the film The Men Who Make the Music. He doesn't care about who Devo are, as long as they make him more money and are kept in line by Rod.

=== Pliney the Pinhead ===
First appears in the book My Struggle by Booji Boy (Mark Mothersbaugh).

=== Mongo the Mongoloid ===
First appears in My Struggle by Booji Boy.

=== Dr. Byrthfood ===
Dr. Byrthfood works for Lifeforms Unlimited and makes sure that Devo are kept in tip top working conditions. He shows nothing but loathing for Rod Rooter. Dr. Byrthfood appears in We're All Devo, played by Timothy Leary, and Adventures of the Smart Patrol, played by Alan Moyle.

== Organizations ==
=== Big Entertainment ===
A satire of the entertainment industry. This monopoly corporation is Devo's employer.

=== Lifeforms Unlimited ===
Lifeforms Unlimited is a bio-engineering company that tries to improve humanity through science. Among their employees are: Dr. Byrthfood (Devo's personal aide) and scientists Sun Wang Pin and Yoni Wang Pin. Lifeforms Unlimited inadvertently creates the horror known as "Turkey Monkey", which spreads the disease osso bucco myelitis.

=== The Pilgrims ===
The Pilgrims are a group of religious zealots led by Reverend Vince Gassale (portrayed by Gerald Casale in the home video game Adventures of the Smart Patrol). The Pilgrims wear business suits topped with pilgrim-style hats. They practice televangelism and believe that disease is God's way of punishing those that are morally unsuitable.

=== The Smart Patrol ===
From the Mac/PC game Adventures of the Smart Patrol. The Smart Patrol consist of Jamie Rega, Jeremy Welt, Tanya Olszewski, Max Leidermann, and Grady Sain. (Their music is played by Devo themselves.) The Smart Patrol are the equivalent of a police force in Spudland.

== Fake bands ==
Devo impersonated a number of fake bands in their videos and performances to satire the music business.

=== Parcheesi ===
Named after the "oldest game", Parcheesi performed the song "Midget", heard in the tour film Roll Out The Barrel, included in The Men Who Make the Music. Parcheesi are never shown. The full performance of "Midget" appears on Hardcore Devo: Volume One (1990), the first album of a two-volume collection of 1970s demos.

=== The Cumberbuns ===
A Latin lounge music group, the Cumberbuns made the song "Softcore Mutations" (an early version of "Going Under" from the 1981 album New Traditionalists). A recording of this song was played on the Dr. Demento show, introduced by Booji Boy.

=== DOVE, The Band of Love ===
Devo's Christian rock alter-egos, and the only fake Devo band to actually perform live. Dove performs in leisure suits with green accountants visors. They perform Christian versions of Devo songs. Dove appears in the film Pray TV, performing the Devo song "Shrivel Up" (actually miming to the album version), and footage of a Dove performance from the 1979 M-80 Festival appears on both The Complete Truth About De-Evolution, and as a bonus feature on Devo Live 1980.

=== The Evil Clowns ===
Referenced in We're All Devo, The Evil Clowns are Big Entertainment's "mega-metal group". Pictures of the lead singer, Numero Uno, allegedly consist of Mark Mothersbaugh's head pasted on the body of David Lee Roth.

=== The Big Dirty Farmers ===
The Big Dirty Farmers appeared in the only "Club Devo" animation for shockwave.com, performing the song "It's All Good".

=== Skunk Man Fly ===
Skunk Man Fly, featured in the Devo song "Chango," were proposed for a later, unfinished installment of "Club Devo", but no material was recorded.

=== The Sex Dolls ===
The Sex Dolls were proposed for an unrealized installment of "Club Devo", with a song and animation, but no material was recorded.

== Notes ==
In June 2000, Club DEVO appeared online as an "animated lounge" at Shockwave.com, with one animated song by The Big Dirty Farmers. "Currently scheduled to appear are The Big Dirty Farmers, Booji Boy, Skunkman Fly, The Smart Patrol, The Sex Dolls, and Parcheezi. General Boy will introduce the bands."
