= We're All Devo =

Video by Devo
- Released: 1984
- Genre: New wave

We're All Devo! is the second home video release by American new wave band Devo. Released on VHS, LaserDisc, CED, and Betamax in 1984, We're All Devo! is a collection of Devo music videos from 1976 to 1983.

== Synopsis ==
Like The Men Who Make the Music (1979), We're All Devo! has a storyline to tie the videos together. In it, the character of Rod Rooter (Michael W Schwartz) is reviewing Devo's music videos for Big Entertainment. Much to his chagrin, his daughter Donut Rooter (Laraine Newman) is a fan of the band. Donut discovers the videos after asking her father for money to get an abortion (though this is not explicitly stated). Two excerpts from the storyline were included in The Complete Truth About De-Evolution (1993) LaserDisc and DVD (both out of sequence) but the rest is exclusive to this release. "Theme from Doctor Detroit" was also not included, and was unique to this title until the MVD DVD of The Complete Truth About De-Evolution.

== Track listing ==
- "(I Can't Get No) Satisfaction"
- "The Day My Baby Gave Me a Surprise"
- "Whip It"
- "Girl U Want"
- "Freedom Of Choice"
- "Beautiful World"
- "Peek-a-Boo!"
- "That's Good"
- "Theme from Doctor Detroit"
- "Through Being Cool"
- "Love Without Anger"
- "It Takes a Worried Man" (from the film Human Highway)
- Credits (video outtakes with the E-Z Listening version of "Whip It")
- "Jocko Homo" (Bonus)
