= Devo Live: The Mongoloid Years =

DEVO Live: The Mongoloid Years

Live album by Devo
- Released: 1992
- Recorded: October 31, 1975 – November 15, 1977
- Genre: Art punk; new wave; post-punk
- Label: Rykodisc

Devo chronology
Hardcore Devo: Volume Two (1991)	DEVO Live: The Mongoloid Years (1992)	Live in Central Park (2004)

Professional ratings
Review scores
Source	Rating
AllMusic	2/5 stars
Select	3/5 stars

DEVO Live: The Mongoloid Years is a live album consisting of recordings from three early performances by American new wave band Devo, released by Rykodisc in 1992.

Two of the three live shows featured in this CD later received expanded individual releases; Live At Max's Kansas City - November 15, 1977 (2014), and Nitrous Nightmare (2026). The former was a limited edition Record Store Day release with a singular 9 second bonus track featuring David Bowie, and the latter being a 2xCD release containing the entirety of the 1975 live performance, with 55 minutes of additional material.

== Overview ==
The album presents parts of three Devo concerts from their early days, presented in reverse chronological order: Max's Kansas City in November 1977 (mislabeled as May 1977), the Crypt in Akron in December 1976, and the WHK Auditorium in Cleveland on Halloween 1975. The concerts were recorded on four-track tape by the band, and the selections are described by Gerald Casale as "the best of the only audio tapes that escaped total disintegration over the last 15 years" in the liner notes.

The album includes an essay and description of the shows, penned by Casale, titled "The rest, as they say, is De-evolution." It describes both the environment of the shows and the development of the early band.

=== Max's Kansas City, NYC, November 1977 ===
Tracks 1 through 9 are culled from this show. According to Casale, the day after the show, once arriving back in Akron, the band began to receive phone calls from record labels.

In 2014, Jackpot Records issued this set as a limited edition LP of 2000, Live at Max's Kansas City - November 15, 1977, including newly recovered audio of David Bowie introducing the set that night, and new liner notes by Casale.

=== The Crypt, Akron, December 1976 ===
Tracks 10 through 13 stem from this set, a performance of Devo opening for the Dead Boys. Devo and Dead Boys fans began to clash in the audience, and the Dead Boys' Cheetah Chrome started a fight when Mark Mothersbaugh approached him during Devo's performance of "Jocko Homo". This was only the second Devo show to feature the five-man lineup that the band would continue with for the next ten years, including guitarist Bob Casale and drummer Alan Myers.

=== WHK Auditorium, Cleveland, Halloween 1975 ===
The remainder of the disc is a very early Devo concert. The band had jokingly billed themselves as a cover band in order to garner a slot opening for Sun Ra at WHK-FM's annual Halloween party and appeared as four characters: Booji Boy (Mark Mothersbaugh), Clown (Bob Mothersbaugh), Jungle Jim (Jim Mothersbaugh) and Chinaman (Gerald Casale). This show featured the first ever performance of "Jocko Homo", during which Devo invited the audience to invade the stage, which resulted in them verbally threatening the band.

An alternative account of the evening states that the crowd became angry because Devo refused to stop playing and the headliner, Sun Ra, never got to perform. However, Casale states that the venue cleared out following Devo's set and that the band went on to watch Sun Ra's "incredible performance".

The full recording of the concert was later released on vinyl and CD as Nitrous Nightmare in 2026.

== Track listing ==
November 15, 1977, Max's Kansas City, New York
No.	Title	Writer(s)	Length
1.	"(I Can't Get No) Satisfaction"	Mick Jagger, Keith Richards	3:18
2.	"Too Much Paranoias"	Mark Mothersbaugh	2:20
3.	"Praying Hands"	M. Mothersbaugh, Gerald Casale	4:10
4.	"Uncontrollable Urge"	M. Mothersbaugh	3:21
5.	"Mongoloid"	M. Mothersbaugh, Casale	3:26
6.	"Smart Patrol/Mr. DNA"	M. Mothersbaugh, Casale	8:02
7.	"Gut Feeling/(Slap Your Mammy)"	Bob Mothersbaugh, Casale, M. Mothersbaugh	4:43
8.	"Sloppy (I Saw My Baby Gettin')"	B. Mothersbaugh, Casale, Gary Jackett, M. Mothersbaugh	2:42
9.	"Come Back Jonee"	M. Mothersbaugh, Casale	4:00

December 1976, The Crypt, Akron, Ohio
No.	Title	Writer(s)	Length
10.	"Clockout"	Casale	2:40
11.	"Soo Bawls"	M. Mothersbaugh	3:50
12.	"Space Junk"	M. Mothersbaugh, Casale	2:31
13.	"Blockhead"	B. Mothersbaugh, M. Mothersbaugh	3:11

October 31, 1975, WHK Auditorium, Cleveland, Ohio
No.	Title	Writer(s)	Length
14.	"Subhuman Woman"	Casale	4:42
15.	"Bamboo Bimbo"	M. Mothersbaugh, Casale	3:21
16.	"Beulah"	Casale	3:13
17.	"Jocko Homo/I Need a Chick"	M. Mothersbaugh/Casale, Peter Gregg	12:31
Total length:			1:12:01

== Personnel ==
Devo

- Mark Mothersbaugh – guitar (1–2), vocals (1–4, 6–9, 11, 13, 17), keyboards
- Gerald V. Casale – vocals (5–6, 10, 12, 14, 16–17), bass guitar
- Bob Mothersbaugh – vocals (5–6), guitar
- Bob Casale – guitar, bass guitar (10), backing vocals (1–13)
- Alan Myers – drums (1–13)
- Jim Mothersbaugh – electronic percussion (14–17)

Technical

- Gerald V. Casale – liner notes
- Bruce Conner – cover photo, photography
- Barbara Watson – rear card photo, photography
- Ruby Ray – photography
- Dr. Toby Mountain – mastering
- Steve Jurgensmeyer – design
