= Devo Live 1980 =

DEVO Live 1980

Live album (DualDisc) by Devo
- Released: August 30, 2005
- Recorded: August 17, 1980
- Venue: Phoenix Theater (Petaluma, California)
- Genre: New wave; punk rock
- Length: 59:49 (CD); Approx. 75:00 (DVD)
- Label: Target Video

Devo chronology
Whip It and Other Hits (2003)	DEVO Live 1980 (2005)	Live in Central Park (2005)

Alternative covers
- DVD Cover

Professional ratings
Review scores
Source	Rating
AllMusic	4/5 stars

DEVO Live 1980 is a live album and video DualDisc release by American new wave band Devo, released by Target Video in 2005.

== Background ==
The release documents a performance by the band filmed on August 17, 1980, during their Freedom of Choice tour, when the band was gaining mainstream success on the strength of the Freedom of Choice album and their hit single, "Whip It". It was shot by director/cameraman Joe Reis and his Target Video team at the Phoenix Theater in Petaluma, California, using three video cameras. Bassist/songwriter/vocalist Gerald V. Casale provided the following note for the DualDisc's back cover: "This lone artifact offers indisputable evidence that in 1980 Devo had reached a turning point. We were no longer just art monsters, we were mainstream performers too."

The setlist is similar to that of the full DEV-O Live album (as released by Rhino Records' Rhino Handmade imprint in 1999 and as a regular Rhino CD release in 2005), which was recorded within a few days of this concert. The DVD side of the DualDisc features bonus video footage of Devo opening for themselves at the M-80 Festival as "Dove, the Band of Love".

A short clip of the band performing "Gut Feeling/(Slap Your Mammy)" from this concert was previously seen on the band's 2004 DVD release Live in the Land of the Rising Sun.

== Release ==
Devo Live 1980 was first released on July 12, 2005. The DualDisc release is available in both jewel case (CD) and Amaray (DVD) packaging. Separate CD and DVD editions were also issued.

== Track listing ==
=== DVD side ===
1. "Freedom of Choice Theme Song"
2. "Whip It"
3. "Snowball"
4. "It's Not Right"
5. "Girl U Want"
6. "Planet Earth"
7. "S.I.B. (Swelling Itching Brain)"
8. "Secret Agent Man"
9. "Pink Pussycat"
10. "Blockhead"
11. "(I Can't Get No) Satisfaction"
12. "Uncontrollable Urge"
13. "Mongoloid"
14. "Be Stiff"
15. "Gates of Steel"
16. "Freedom of Choice"
17. "Jocko Homo"
18. "Smart Patrol/Mr. DNA"
19. "Gut Feeling/Slap Your Mammy"
20. "Come Back Jonee"
21. "Tunnel of Life"
22. "Devo Corporate Anthem"

=== CD side ===
1. "Whip It"
2. "Snowball"
3. "It's Not Right"
4. "Girl U Want"
5. "Planet Earth"
6. "S.I.B. (Swelling Itching Brain)"
7. "Secret Agent Man"
8. "Pink Pussycat"
9. "Blockhead"
10. "(I Can't Get No) Satisfaction"
11. "Uncontrollable Urge"
12. "Mongoloid"
13. "Be Stiff"
14. "Gates of Steel"
15. "Freedom of Choice"
16. "Smart Patrol/Mr. DNA"
17. "Gut Feeling/Slap Your Mammy"
18. "Come Back Jonee"

== Personnel ==
Devo

- Mark Mothersbaugh – vocals, keyboards, guitar
- Gerald V. Casale – vocals, bass, bass keyboards
- Bob Mothersbaugh – vocals, lead guitar
- Bob Casale – rhythm guitar/lead guitar, keyboards, vocals
- Alan Myers – drums

Technical

- Grata Video – producer
- Mike Varga – editor
- Geoff Falasca – editor
- James W. Kelley – animator
- John Joh – graphic design
- Joe Reis – executive producer
- Fred Seaman – executive producer
- Jackie Sharp – co-producer
- Gerald V. Casale – liner notes
- Greg Prato – liner notes
- Bob Casale – CD mastering
