= Disco Dancer (Devo song) =

Single by Devo

from the album Total Devo
- Released: 1988
- Genre: Dance-pop; disco; electronic
- Length: 4:14 (album version)
- Label: Enigma
- Songwriters: Mark Mothersbaugh; Gerald Casale
- Producer: Devo

Devo singles chronology
"Shout" (1985)	"Disco Dancer" (1988)	"Baby Doll" (1988)

Music video
- "Disco Dancer" on YouTube

"Disco Dancer" is a song by the American new wave band Devo, written by Mark Mothersbaugh and Gerald Casale. It was the first Devo single that was released without their most prominent drummer, Alan Myers, who was replaced by former Sparks drummer David Kendrick. It was released in 1988 as the first single from their seventh studio album, Total Devo.

== Composition ==
According to Devo bassist and co-songwriter Gerald Casale, he and Mark Mothersbaugh came up with the idea of a character in the vein of John Travolta's from Saturday Night Fever (1977) falling "into a Rip Van Winkle sleep", and then waking up 15 years later to culture shock. In the commentary for their video anthology The Complete Truth About De-Evolution (1993), Mothersbaugh stated that the original inspiration for the song came from Indian films and music videos. He elaborated further in a 2020 interview with Pitchfork:

Devo used to rehearse in Marina Del Rey and, on the way there, I'd go by the Little India section of Los Angeles. There was a grocery store that sold video compilations that were called Dance Dance Dance. Around 1980, these Indian performers started copying things from MTV, but their versions were surreal and a hundred times better. There was this one where a guy comes out and sings, "I'm a disco! Yeah, I'm a disco!" and he does these exaggerated macho dances. Then 50 women in white nurse outfits come out pushing baby buggies, and then they stop, and the babies jump out, and it's 50 little people in diapers and beards singing and dancing. I was like, Man, there's never been anything on MTV this good! We ended up writing a song called "Disco Dancer" because of that one.

== Music video ==
Two videos were made for "Disco Dancer", using remixed versions of the track by producer Ivan Ivan. Both videos are similar, but the 12-inch mix video has additional footage, including a topless woman, and was only on promotional VHS tapes distributed to nightclubs. The video footage was recorded from two parties that the band threw, one in New York City and the other one in Los Angeles. The NYC footage was recorded in black and white, while the L.A. footage was shot in colour, with scenes from both parties being intercut in the video. According to Casale, the video failed to receive airplay after first being aired on MTV's "Smash or Trash?," in which a video was aired and viewers would call in and vote on it. The video was "trashed" and MTV refused to air it after that.

== Track listing ==
- 12-inch single (Enigma V-75511)
1. "Disco Dancer" (7-inch Version) – 4:15
2. "Disco Dancer" (12-inch Version) – 6:30
3. "Disco Dancer" (Bonus Beats) – 4:20
4. "Disco Dancer" (7-inch Version) – 4:15
5. "Disco Dancer" (12-inch Version) – 6:30
6. "Disco Dancer" (Bonus Beats) – 4:20
- 7-inch single (Enigma 7 75023-7)
1. "Disco Dancer" (7-inch Version) – 4:15
2. "Disco Dancer" (Karaoke TV Version) – 4:15
- CD single (Enigma D3-75511, 7 75511-3)
1. "Disco Dancer" (7-inch Version) – 4:15
2. "Disco Dancer" (12-inch Version) – 6:32
3. "Disco Dancer" (Bonus Beats) – 4:26
4. "Disco Dancer" (Karaoke Version) – 4:26
- Cassette single (Enigma 4V-75511)
1. "Disco Dancer" (7-inch Version) – 4:15
2. "Disco Dancer" (12-inch Version) – 6:30
3. "Disco Dancer" (Bonus Beats) – 4:20
4. "Disco Dancer" (7-inch Version) – 4:15
5. "Disco Dancer" (12-inch Version) – 6:30
6. "Disco Dancer" (Bonus Beats) – 4:20

== Chart performance ==
Chart performance for "Disco Dancer"
Chart (1988)	Peak position
US Dance Club Songs	45
US Hot Dance Music/Maxi-Singles Sales	40
