= Alan Myers (drummer) =

American drummer (1954–2013)

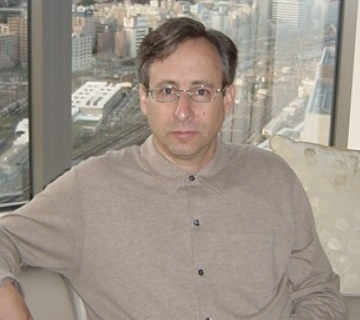
- Myers, 2006

Background information
- Also known as: Human Metronome
- Born: Alan Charles Myers; December 29, 1954; Akron, Ohio, U.S.
- Died: June 24, 2013 (aged 58) Los Angeles, California, U.S.
- Genres: New wave; punk rock; post-punk; electropunk; art punk; synth-pop; electronic rock
- Occupation: Musician
- Instruments: Drums; percussion
- Years active: 1976–2013
- Formerly of: Devo; Swahili Blonde; Skyline Electric

Alan Charles Myers (December 29, 1954 – June 24, 2013) was an American rock drummer whose music career spanned more than 30 years. He came to prominence in the late 1970s as the third and most prominent drummer of the new wave band Devo, replacing Jim Mothersbaugh.

== Early years ==
Alan Charles Myers was born in 1954 in Akron, Ohio and came from a jazz background. He graduated from Firestone High School in 1973. In 1976, he met Bob Mothersbaugh at a café in West Akron and went to the house Bob and Gerald Casale were renting for an audition. Alan was Jewish and had been playing percussion since at least junior high school.

== Career ==
=== Devo ===
In early 1970, Bob Lewis and Gerald Casale formed the idea of the "de-evolution" of the human race after Casale's friend Jeffrey Miller was killed by Ohio National Guardsmen firing on a student demonstration. Myers joined Devo in 1976, replacing Jim Mothersbaugh following his departure and played on a conventional, acoustic drum kit. After the band underwent a few line-up changes, Myers became part of the most popular five-piece incarnation, which included the Casale brothers: Gerald and Bob ("Bob 2") and the Mothersbaugh brothers: Mark and Bob ("Bob 1") and played on Devo's first six studio albums. Myers was the youngest member of the band. In 1981, Myers with Devo served as Toni Basil's backing band on Word of Mouth, her debut album, which included versions of three Devo songs, recorded with Basil's singing lead.

Myers became discontented as Devo began to add drum machines to some of their songs. New Traditionalists featured them for the first time, and most of the music on their next album Oh, No! It's Devo was created by electronic means, while Shout was made almost entirely using the Fairlight CMI digital sampling synthesizer.

According to the book We Are Devo, Myers cited a lack of creative fulfilment as his reason for leaving the band. Since Devo's move to Los Angeles, California, in the late 1970s, he'd felt his role greatly reduced partly due to the use of drum machines. He left even though Gerald Casale had begged him not to.

Among all of Devo's drummers, Myers is the one most associated with the band. In 1987, Devo reformed with new drummer David Kendrick, formerly of Sparks, to replace Myers.

Myers and the other Devo members were part of the Church of the SubGenius.

=== Other work ===
After he had left Devo, Myers went to work as an electrical contractor, but also remained active in the Los Angeles music scene. He recorded a demo with Babooshka, a band that was his girlfriend Greta Ionita's creation, using live drums as well as electronic percussion similar to his last two albums with Devo. Myers also played drums with the Asian-themed pop band Jean Paul Yamamoto. In 2005, he founded the band Skyline Electric which played monthly shows in art galleries and clubs in Los Angeles. The line-up at the time of Myers' death included his wife, Christine (Sugiyama) Myers, and an assortment of other experimental musicians. In 2010, Myers began playing in the live ensemble of musical project Swahili Blonde with his daughter, Laena Geronimo (Myers-Ionita).

== Death ==
On June 24, 2013, Myers died at the age of 58, in Los Angeles, California, due to stomach cancer. News reports at the time of his death incorrectly cited a brain tumor as the cause. Myers' death was first reported on Facebook by his friend Ralph Carney, a jazz musician who knew him in Devo's hometown of Akron, Ohio. His death came a month before the release of Something Else for Everybody, outtakes from Devo's ninth studio album Something for Everybody (2010).

Gerald Casale tweeted that Myers was "the most incredible drummer I had the privilege to play with for 10 years. Losing him was like losing an arm." Josh Freese tweeted that Myers was "1 of [his] all time favs. An underrated/brilliant drummer. Such an honor playing his parts w/Devo. Godspeed Human Metronome."

On June 28, 2013, Skyline Electric performed a tribute to Myers at Human Resources Los Angeles in Los Angeles's Chinatown.

== Discography ==
Year	Act	Release	Role	Notes
1977	Devo	Mongoloid / Jocko Homo	Percussion	7" single, uncredited
1977	Devo	Satisfaction / Sloppy	Percussion	7" single
1978	Devo	Be Stiff / Social Fools	Percussion	7" single, uncredited
1978	Devo	Q: Are We Not Men? A: We Are Devo!	Percussion	
1979	Devo	Duty Now for the Future	Percussion	Uncredited
1980	Devo	Freedom of Choice	Percussion	
1981	Devo	New Traditionalists	Percussion	Uncredited
1981	Ronnie Wood	1234	Drums	On "Wind Howlin' Through"
1981	Toni Basil	Word of Mouth	Drums	On "You Gotta Problem" & "Space Girls"
1982	Devo	Oh, No! It's Devo	Percussion	
1984	Devo	Shout	Percussion	Uncredited
1986	Martini Ranch	How Can the Labouring Man Find Time for Self-Culture?	Percussion	EP. One of Alan's last recordings with Mark Mothersbaugh & Bob Casale of Devo
1986	Devo	E-Z Listening Disc	Percussion	Recorded 1978–1984
1990	Devo	Hardcore Devo Volume One	Percussion	On "Soo Bawlz," "Satisfaction," "Uglatto," "Stop Look and Listen," "Mongoloid" Recorded 1976–1977
1991	Devo	Hardcore Devo Volume Two	Percussion	On "Working in the Coal Mine," "Fountain of Filth," "Clockout" Recorded 1976–1977
1992	Devo	Live: The Mongoloid Years	Percussion	Recorded 1976–1977
2000	Devo	Recombo DNA	Drums	Recorded 1977–1984
2000	Devo	Pioneers Who Got Scalped - The Anthology	Drums	Recorded 1976–1984
2012	Swahili Blonde	Covers EP	Percussion	
2023		Art Devo 1973–1977	Percussion	Recorded 1976–1977

== Filmography ==
- Devo's The Men Who Make the Music (1979, actor, self)
- Devo's The Complete Truth About De-Evolution (2003, actor, self)
