= The Men Who Make the Music =

Video by Devo
- Released: 1979
- Recorded: 1976 (Jocko Homo & Secret Agent Man) 1978 (Satisfaction & Come Back Jonee Videos) October 10, 1978 (Concert Footage) May 28, 1979 (Red Eye) 1979 (Interstitials)
- Genre: New wave
- Label: Virgin

The Men Who Make the Music was the first home video released by the American new wave band Devo. Finished in 1979, the film was set to be the first Video LP under the title "DevoVision" (advertised in the inner sleeve of the "Duty Now for the Future" LP), but was shelved by Time Life due to concerns about its anti-music industry content. It was released in 1981. A DVD of this film was announced in 2000, due to be released by Rhino Records, but this never came to pass. In January 2014, Michael Pilmer, webmaster of the official Devo website, indicated a DVD release by MVD later in the year. The DVD was released the following August, including a bonus feature of Devo's 1996 reunion show at the Sundance Film Festival.

A concert film of Devo on their 1979 tour of Japan was also titled The Men Who Make the Music, filmed at the Nippon Budokan. The performance of "Red Eye" from this show is also on the official The Men Who Make the Music release.

== Synopsis ==
The Men Who Make the Music combines concert footage from Devo's 1978 tour with music videos and interstitials featuring a vague story about Devo's rocky relationship with "Big Entertainment". The majority of this story line is contained in a long segment called "Roll Out the Barrel" or "Rod Rooter's Big Ream"/"Rod's Big Reamer". This particular segment was shown as an intermission during Devo's 1979 tour and audio recordings appear on bootlegs from this tour. Part of this film also appears on The Complete Truth About De-Evolution. The other interstitials involve General Boy (Robert Mothersbaugh Sr.) discussing Devo's influence on the world and their philosophy. Members of Devo also make speeches during these interstitials.

== Track listing ==
- Jocko Homo (Music video, taken from The Truth About De-Evolution)
- Titles
- General Boy Segment 1
- Wiggly World (Live)
- General Boy Segment 2
- The Day My Baby Gave Me a Surprize (Music video)
- Roll Out the Barrel (AKA "Rod Rooter's Big Reamer")
- Praying Hands (Live)
- General Boy Segment 3
- Uncontrollable Urge (Live)
- (I Can't Get No) Satisfaction (Music video)
- General Boy Segment 4
- Jocko Homo (Live, partial performance)
- Secret Agent Man (Music video, taken from The Truth About De-Evolution)
- Smart Patrol/Mr. DNA (Live)
- Come Back Jonee (Music Video)
- General Boy Segment 5
- Red Eye (Live)
- Credits
- Devo Corporate Anthem
