= Live 1980 =

Live 1980 may refer to:

- Devo Live 1980
- Live 1980 (Sammy Hagar album)
- Live 1980, Clarence "Gatemouth" Brown
