= Booji Boy =

Character created by new wave band Devo

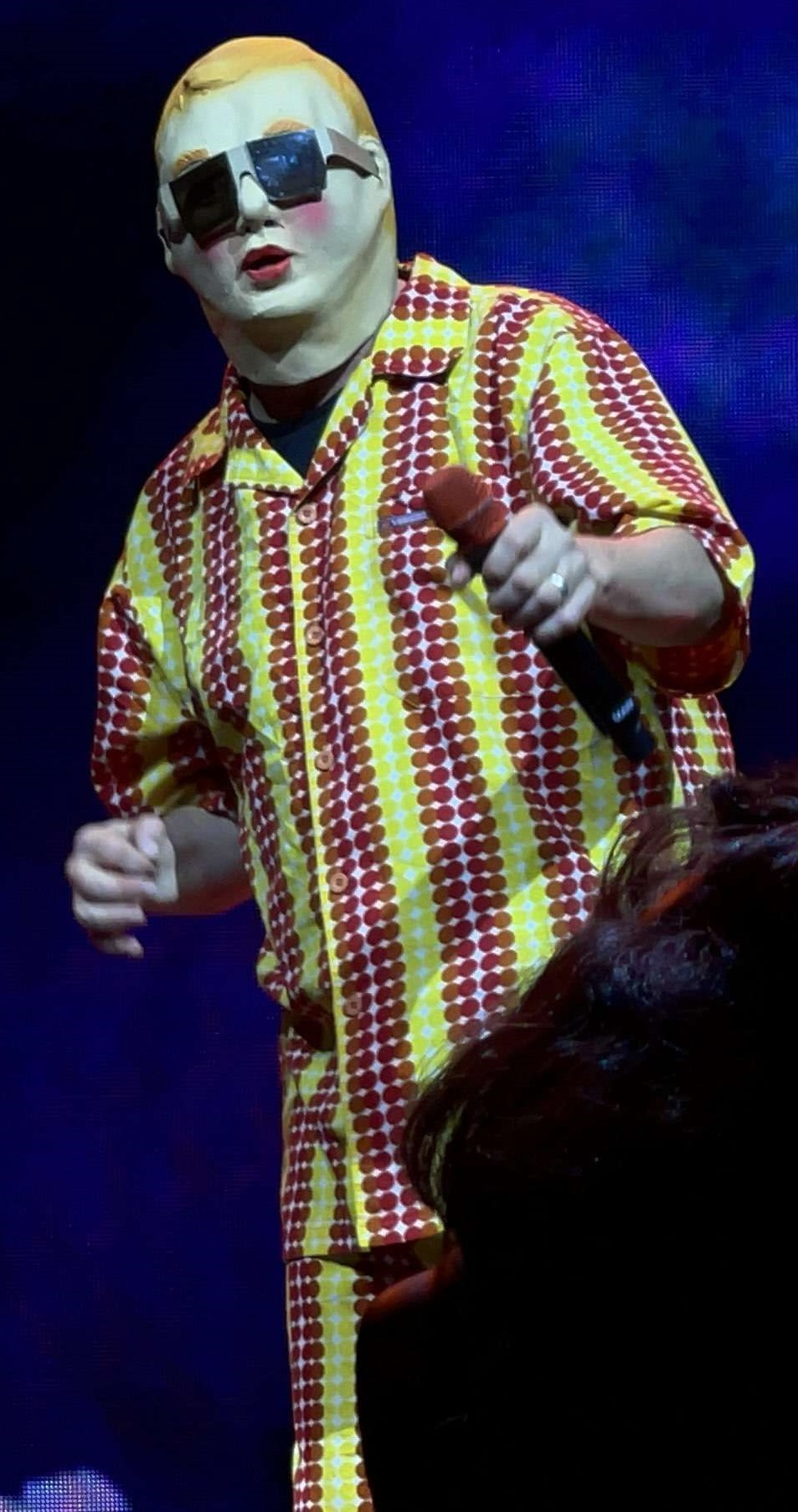
Booji Boy performing live in 2023

Booji Boy /ˈbʊɡi/ is a character created in the early 1970s by the American new wave band Devo. The name is pronounced "Boogie Boy"—the strange spelling "Booji" resulted when the band was using Letraset to produce captions for a film, and ran out of the letter "g". When the "i" was added but before the "e", Devo's lead singer Mark Mothersbaugh reportedly remarked that the odd spelling "looked right".

Booji Boy has traits of a simian child and typically wears an orange nuclear protection suit. He is portrayed by Mothersbaugh in a mask and is the son of another fictitious Devo character, General Boy. The intent of the figure is to satirize infantile regression in Western culture, a quality Devo enjoyed elucidating. This character was officially introduced in the 9-minute short film The Truth About De-Evolution (1976).

According to the book We're All Devo!, the roots of the character come from discovering a baby mask in an Akron area novelty store. Mothersbaugh developed the character's distinctive high pitched falsetto almost instantly. He had kept a supply of Booji Boy masks for several years, but due to improper storage, many of them ended up ruined from dry rot. A similar, half-head mask was used in concerts during 2004 and 2005, and a new mask based on the original was created and used beginning in 2007. In 2012, SikRik Masks in Devo's hometown of Akron, Ohio made a new mask that more closely resembled the original. The company made 100 copies of the new mask, which were sold through Club Devo.

Booji Boy was incorporated into Devo's 1996 PC CD-ROM video game Devo Presents Adventures of the Smart Patrol. His name was simplified to "Boogie Boy" and the game claims his "real name" was "Craig Allen Rothwell". Not coincidentally, this is also supposedly the real name of the dancer known as "Spazz Attack" who appeared in some of Devo's videos and played Booji Boy on a Devo tour.

The game's booklet contained more information about the character's back story:

Obsessed with the idea of genetic mutation, Craig submitted to a botched operation in an effort to land a media deal with Big Media. Voila! Boogie Boy - a bizarre adult infant freak with pre-adolescent sexuality and Yoda-like wisdom.

Booji Boy has been featured in the band's visual imagery throughout their career. For example, he plays a prominent role in the video of their 1981 single "Beautiful World". He also appeared in the 1982 Neil Young film Human Highway in a very comical yet unsettling role predicting the end of the planet. Booji is pictured on the cover art to Recombo DNA. Booji Boy publicly announced his pending resignation on multiple occasions, most recently on August 13, 2007, yet he appeared at a Summerfest concert on July 4, 2010 and on July 8, 2010 at the Town Ballroom in Buffalo, New York. Booji Boy continues to appear in concert regularly to perform "Beautiful World". In recent years, Booji Boy's concert appearances have seen him dressed in modern "hip hop" attire (including a sideways ball cap and sporting "bling"), with Devo bass guitarist Gerald Casale introducing him as "Boogie Boyyyyyy".

Beyond Devo's works, Booji appeared in the Zabagabee home video by Barnes & Barnes demonstrating how to masturbate, and in the music video for "You Ain't Fresh" by hip hop duo Boogie Boys.

== Booji Boy Records ==
"Booji Boy" was also the name of the independent label Devo used to record their earliest songs. More recently it has become an archival release label, releasing old material of interest to fans. The following vinyl releases were sold under the Booji Boy banner:

List of Booji Boy Records releases
Year	Title	Format	Catalog number	Notes
1977	"Mongoloid" / "Jocko Homo"	7"	7033-14	
1977	"(I Can't Get No) Satisfaction" / "Sloppy (I Saw My Baby Getting)"	7"	72843	
2012	New Traditionalists – Live 1981 Seattle	2×LP	BOOJI-001	
2014	Something Else for Everybody	CD	DEV-00001-2	Outtakes from Something for Everybody
2015	"Nutty Buddy"	CASS	FUTURISMO No.11	Single, recorded live in 1977
2019	"It's All Good"	7"	Futurismo No. 33	Recorded in the early 2000s
2020	"Freedom of Choice" / "Girl U Want"	7"	SHADE 029	Recorded live in 2012 and 2019

== My Struggle ==
Mothersbaugh, as Booji Boy, wrote a book titled My Struggle. The title is the English translation of Adolf Hitler's Mein Kampf and the book featured a red leather cover as a poke at Chairman Mao Zedong's "Little Red Book". Excerpts from the book can also be found hidden in Devo's CD-ROM game "Devo Presents Adventures of the Smart Patrol."

== Songs performed by Booji Boy ==
Booji Boy primarily performs live, but his voice was used on several early Devo recordings, such as "Lost At Home (Tater Tot)" and an early version of "Smart Patrol". His only album appearances are the song "Puppet Boy" from Shout, Devo's cover of "Bread and Butter" by The Newbeats and a re-recorded vocal track to the early demo "U Got Me Bugged", which appears on the soundtrack to Devo Presents Adventures of the Smart Patrol (performed by Pat Tierney instead of Mark Mothersbaugh).

In concert, Booji has performed several songs:

- "The Words Get Stuck in My Throat" – performed live in concert in 1977 and 1978, and in 2026 with the Red Room Orchestra featuring Mark Mothersbaugh. In 2000, a studio version was recorded for the compilation Pioneers Who Got Scalped. The song originates from the Japanese film The War of the Gargantuas.
- "I Need a Chick" – performed at some shows in 1977 and 1978.
- "Red Eye" – performed on the 1978 tour, and seen in the film The Men Who Make the Music.
- "In Heaven Everything Is Fine" and "The One That Gets Away" – performed in 1979. "In Heaven" was originally part of the soundtrack of the David Lynch film Eraserhead.
- "Gotta Serve Somebody" – performed with Devo's alter-ego Dove, "the band of love". A live recording appears on the compilation album Recombo DNA.
- "U Got Me Bugged" – performed at two shows in late 1979, and again on the Hardcore Devo tour in 2014
- "Tunnel of Life" – performed in 1980. Video of this performance appears on the Devo Live 1980 DVD. (The instrumental version of this song, which appears on Hardcore Devo: Volume Two, is titled "Booji Boy's Funeral".)
- "Beautiful World" – performed since 1981; performed live with Terri Nunn at the YouTube Theater November 16, 2023.
- "Hey Hey My My" – performed with Neil Young on Human Highway

== Bibliography ==
- We're All Devo by Jade Dellinger and David Giffels, SAF Publishing Ltd; 2nd edition (21 August 2008), ISBN 978-0946719761
