= Freedom of Choice (album) =

Studio album by Devo
- Released: 16 May 1980
- Recorded: October 1979 – early 1980
- Studio: Record Plant (Hollywood)
- Genres: New wave; synth-pop
- Length: 32:14
- Label: Warner Bros.
- Producers: Devo; Robert Margouleff

Devo chronology
Duty Now for the Future (1979)	Freedom of Choice (1980)	New Traditionalists (1981)

Singles from Freedom of Choice
- 1. "Girl U Want" Released: April 24, 1980; 2. "Whip It" Released: August 13, 1980; 3. "Gates of Steel" Released: October 6, 1980; 4. "Freedom of Choice" Released: December 29, 1980

Freedom of Choice is the third studio album by the American new wave band Devo, released in May 1980 on Warner Bros. Records. The album contained their biggest hit, "Whip It", which hit No. 8 and No. 14 on the Billboard Club Play Singles and Pop Singles charts, respectively. Freedom of Choice peaked at No. 22 on the Billboard Pop Albums chart.

== Background ==
Devo had amassed a sizeable following after the release of their first two studio albums with Warner Bros. However, after the band's second album Duty Now for the Future (1979) was not as well received, the label presented the band with a "make or break" ultimatum for their forthcoming third album. Warner Bros. told the band that if sales did not increase with the new album's release, the label would terminate their contract. Devo frontman Mark Mothersbaugh later contended that Warner Bros. threatened the band's manager Elliot Roberts with litigation if Devo did not achieve chart success with the album.

While the material on Devo's first two albums mostly consisted of old songs written between 1974 and 1977, the band decided to compose all new material for the upcoming crucial third album. The songs were written after the band had completed their second world tour.

The creation of Freedom of Choice saw the band now living in Los Angeles and choosing to start from scratch. The band rented a space on Wilcox Avenue in Hollywood that had been converted from old abandoned storefronts in which they would compose and rehearse new material.

== Composition ==
Bob Mothersbaugh and I had always loved R&B. And we had always listened to stations out of Detroit and we loved Motown. We were pushing to go that direction with beats and bass lines and to think of the music like Devo robots doing R&B with futuristic overtones. Mark really got into it, and thought if that's what we're going to do, let's go all the way. Nobody understood that was our theoretical construct or our inspiration when they were listening to that music, because it's so mutated from the inspiration.

— Gerald Casale; American Songwriter, February 20, 2020

Freedom of Choice was informed by bassist Gerald Casale's and guitarist Bob Mothersbaugh's mutual love of R&B music. The band decided that heading in a more funk-oriented direction with their new songs would satisfy both themselves and Warner Bros. DJ Pangburn of Sound on Sound later observed that the album "is far from R&B, although it's funky and moves in a way that its two predecessors do not." The band members all fully committed to the new artistic direction and were later in agreement that it was their best album, strongest set of songs and most enjoyable experience in the studio, due to their positive working relationship. However, Casale has said that the band's fanbase were very critical of this stylistic departure.

The songs on Freedom of Choice were more mainstream and accessible than its two predecessors. Casale recalled that "This was a self-imposed challenge. Can we write songs? Because we always thought that was a little bit beneath [who] Devo was, but in the end, not really. You have to be able to deliver." Author Evie Nagy recounted that Mark Mothersbaugh claimed he was incapable of intentionally writing a hit song. Casale added that "We were mutating ourselves on purpose, with that purpose being to make something bolder and funkier, still with guitars and energy, and still maintain the energy of our stage show".

=== Songs ===
The lyrics of "Whip It" were originally written by Casale in one night "as an imitation of Thomas Pynchon's parodies in his book Gravity's Rainbow". Mark Mothersbaugh also viewed it as a Dale Carnegie-esque inspirational song for then-U.S. President Jimmy Carter. The music originated as four different demo pieces, largely written by Mark Mothersbaugh and later assembled and arranged by Casale. The riff was based on Roy Orbison's "Oh, Pretty Woman".

The lyrics of the title track were written by Casale about the United States' conservative political shift preceding the election of Ronald Reagan.

He was empowering the evangelicals. Pat Robertson and all those guys were being taken seriously and pressuring congressmen and senators. So “Freedom of Choice” was about if you don’t take it seriously, there are despots and tyrants that will take [it] away from you.

— Gerald Casale, Variety, May 20, 2020

"Gates of Steel" was written after sessions concluded for the band's debut album, Q. Are We Not Men? A: We Are Devo! (1978), and began as an instrumental demo recorded by Mark Mothersbaugh with Debbie Smith and Sue Schmidt of the band Chi-Pig. Casale liked the progression and, during rehearsals for Freedom of Choice, melded it with some standalone lyrics he had written. "Cold War" was a rare collaboration between Casale and Bob Mothersbaugh, developed after hours in the studio circa November 1979.

"That's Pep!" features lyrics taken from the poem "Pep" by Grace G. Bostwick, which was published in The American Magazine in 1919, prior to U.S. copyright law. The music was written by Mark Mothersbaugh and, according to Nagy, is "outside any of the structure [or] lexicon of sounds and beats of rock & roll", despite its incorporation of a Bo Diddley beat. Nagy compares "Ton o' Luv" to "Whip It" in that it is a "parody of cloying American optimism that is blind to the industrial realities around it."

== Production ==
Devo had not enjoyed the experience of working with their previous producer, Ken Scott, and after the band's sales decreased with the resulting album, Duty Now for the Future, they decided to find a new producer. Mark Mothersbaugh later stated that, while the band admired Bootsy Collins, Prince and Motown, they had difficulty figuring out how to reflect those influences in their own music. The band decided to approach electronic music pioneer Robert Margouleff, due to his work with Stevie Wonder and Tonto's Expanding Head Band (featuring the TONTO synthesizer), as well as in underground cinema. Mark Mothersbaugh recalled that Margouleff satisfied both his love of technology and Casale's interest in achieving a more radio-friendly sound. Pangburn observed that, "with Margouleff at the mixing desk, Devo produced a catchy synth pop album that proved to be their mainstream breakthrough."

The album was demoed at Modern Music Recording Studio in 1980, and these tracks were later released on the compilation album Recombo DNA in 2000. This demo version lacks "It's Not Right", "Ton o' Luv", "Don't You Know" and "Freedom of Choice", but it includes demos of the "Whip It" B-side "Turn Around" and three unreleased tracks ("Luv & Such", "Time Bomb" and "Make Me Move"). The lyrics of "Luv & Such" were later rewritten and the song became "Mr. B's Ballroom". In 2009, another demo titled "Red Shark" surfaced, an early version of "It's Not Right" with alternate lyrics that was offered as a download-only track for fans who purchased tickets to the Freedom of Choice album concerts.

Margouleff initially met the band's proposal with trepidation but was convinced after hearing these demos. He had been looking for an interesting project to pursue, now that his work with Wonder had concluded, and knew the band aligned with his experiences in electronic music. He also cited Devo's "strong political message" as another motivating factor for him to work with the band.

Margouleff frequently visited the band's rehearsal sessions and Mark Mothersbaugh found him to be "interested, engaged and engaging" as well as "super optimistic", likening him to the band's General Boy character. Margouleff recalled that Devo rehearsed the material for several weeks and continued to write in the studio even after the proper album sessions began.

== Recording ==
Freedom of Choice was recorded and mixed in six weeks at the Record Plant in Los Angeles using a 24-track machine, with Margouleff co-producing the sessions with the band and co-engineering with Howard Seigel. Bass, drums and guitars were all recorded live together, while synths and vocals were overdubbed later. Bob Mothersbaugh recalled that Margouleff "created a good atmosphere to play live". Margouleff also encouraged the band to pursue a more raw production sound, stripping away effects and layers. He experimented with different mic placements and recording methods for every track and left the tapes constantly rolling in the hopes of capturing something spontaneous.

Margouleff paid particular focus to the sound of the rhythm section:

It was basically in the grooves, in the bottom end. ... We set up the grooves for the songs so that the songs were not self-consciously about the top end. If you play the record, you'll hear that the bass, the kick and the rest of the drums are very, very prominent and dry in the mixes, so you feel like you're standing next to the kit.

— Robert Margouleff, Sound on Sound, July 2008

Casale opted to use a Moog bass synthesizer on the album, inspired by Margouleff's work with Wonder, and Margouleff suggested he use the same amplifier he had used in rehearsals in order to get the same "thick" sound as the band's demo sessions. Other synthesizers used on the album include a Minimoog, a Moog Liberation, an ElectroComp 500 (for the whip crack sounds on "Whip It") and a custom-made Moog called a "Devobox". Music historian Andy Zax noted that, on Freedom of Choice, "synthesizers had now been upgraded to a starring role, while an increasingly sophisticated pop sensibility infiltrated the group's new songs."

Much like Margouleff's work with Wonder, the album was mixed drily, and Margouleff recalled, "I was always striving to get the band as close as possible, falling off the proscenium arch and into the audience, so that the listeners would feel like they're moving inside the band."

== Artwork and title ==
To take the idea of wearing the suits with hands in protective position over the crotch, all looking robotic and not free at all with the slogan "Freedom of Choice," was an obvious joke to us. Plus, two American flags. It worked out: it was an election year, so it looked like we knew what we were doing beyond what we knew.

— Gerald Casale; DEVO: The Brand, 2018

The cover features the band wearing silver suits made of Naugahyde, designed by Casale and inspired by suits worn by Black R&B groups of the 1950s. The band's red "energy dome" hats were inspired by Art Deco light fixtures Casale remembered from the grade school he had attended, which was built in the 1920s. The hats were designed by Brent Scrivner and fashioned from vacuform ABS white plastic, spray-painted with Chinese red lacquer. The band also wore black boat neck shirts, which were popular with beach-goers in the 1960s.

The title Freedom of Choice was chosen because Mark Mothersbaugh and Casale had been fond of that track. Other proposed titles for the album included Time for Devo and You R It.

== Promotion ==
Freedom of Choice was released on May 16, 1980.

"Girl U Want" was the initial single chosen by Warner Bros., and Nagy theorized that its similar feel to the Knack's "My Sharona" made the label think it had commercial potential. The single failed to chart, and after the band began their concert tour, Florida record promoter Kal Rudman urged southeastern DJs to play "Whip It", whose popularity then spread to New York and the rest of the U.S., including gay dance clubs. "Whip It" was formally released as a single on August 13, 1980, and became a genuine hit, peaking at No. 14 on the Billboard Hot 100 for the week of November 15, 1980. Warner Bros. then gave the band an infusion of cash to make a promo video for the song. Despite its success, Casale later expressed that the band had not viewed the song any differently than any other song on the record.

The video for "Whip It" was based on a 1962 issue of Dude magazine that Mark Mothersbaugh had found in an antique store, which contained a story about a dude ranch where the owner would whip his wife's clothes off. The video also played on radio programmers' popular misconception that the song was about masturbation and sadomasochism. It was shot in Devo's rehearsal studio for $15,000.

Promo videos were then shot for both "Freedom of Choice" and "Girl U Want", both of which featured skateboarders from Santa Monica and their friends. "Freedom of Choice" featured professional skateboarders Tony Alva and Stacy Peralta. The latex alien masks were created by Rick Baker, although the band could not afford to pay him to maintain them on set, which resulted in the makeup melting and peeling away from their faces during the shoot. Some of the men who appeared in the "Girl U Want" video were dressed in drag. Casale had wanted Warner Bros. to select "Freedom of Choice" as the next single but the label passed on it. Instead, Warner Bros. chose to continue promoting "Whip It" and have the band focus on completing their next album, New Traditionalists, which they had already begun recording by January 1981.

Devo made an appearance on The Merv Griffin Show and three appearances on the show Fridays. A planned appearance on The Midnight Special in 1981 was canceled when host Lily Tomlin saw the video for "Whip It" and objected to the content.

The press kit for the album included an insert called "Devo Meets the Press", which featured the band giving largely facetious answers to frequently asked questions. The band appeared in an ad campaign for the Moog Liberation synthesizer, which they also used in promo shots at the time.

== Reception ==
Professional ratings
Review scores
Source	Rating
AllMusic	4.5/5 stars
The Encyclopedia of Popular Music	4/5 stars
The Rolling Stone Album Guide	3.5/5 stars
Smash Hits	6/10
Spin Alternative Record Guide	7/10
The Village Voice	B+

=== Commercial ===
Freedom of Choice became Devo's commercial breakthrough, although its success would not be replicated on subsequent records. The album was the band's biggest seller and is their most successful album to date. It peaked at No. 22 on the Billboard 200 chart, while "Whip It" peaked at No. 14 on the Billboard Hot 100 and No. 8 on the Billboard Dance Club Songs chart. Both the album and "Whip It" single sold over a million copies. The album was awarded platinum status by the Recording Industry Association of America on May 13, 1986.

=== Critical ===
In a 1981 review, Robert Christgau of The Village Voice quipped that "if they ever teach a rhythm box to get funky, a Mothersbaugh will be there to plug it in." Writing in Trouser Press, critics Scott Isler and Ira Robbins described the album as "the band's most evocative pairing of words and music". In a retrospective review for AllMusic, Steve Huey praised the album, calling it "their most cohesive, consistent material to date".

Record World described a live version of "Gates of Steel" saying that "its wall-of-sound guitar grind and Mark Mothersbaugh's vocal frenzy should satisfy AOR listeners."

== Tour ==
For the tour, Devo donned their red energy domes, as well as white paper jumpsuits sprayed with gray fabric paint, adorned with red gaffer tape as a shoulder piece and waistband. The stage featured five light panels at the back which were fashioned from plywood with metal frames, and for the second part of the show, the panels were laid down, lit from underneath and used as a stage. The tour included several dates in Japan, including Osaka, Tokyo, Fukuoka and Sendai. Some performances featured the band wearing "goodwill outfits", including white short-sleeved shirts with shoulder pads and black trim, and white pants with black stripes.

The tour was captured on several different commercial releases. The first was a promotional LP of an almost complete gig from August 16 at the Warfield Theatre in San Francisco, recorded for the King Biscuit Flower Hour radio show and issued as part of the ongoing Warner Bros. Music Show series. Shortly thereafter, six tracks from the album appeared as the DEV-O Live mini-album, and in 2000, Rhino Handmade issued a limited edition CD of DEV-O Live, containing both the mini-album and the LP on one disc. In 2005, a performance from the Phoenix Theater in Petaluma, California from the following night was issued as Devo Live 1980 in DualDisc format, with one side containing the show in DVD format and the other containing an edited version of the show's audio in CD format.

The evening show at Raincross Square in Riverside, California on August 19 was cancelled, due to a light bank malfunctioning during the afternoon show, which led ticket holders to riot. However, the show was made up a week later, on August 25.

Following the success of the "Whip It" single, concerts in the middle of the band's tour had to be rescheduled to accommodate larger venues. Gerald Casale later recalled, "We were in the middle of a small club tour – maximum 900 seats – and within two weeks we had to rebook everything for 3,000-5000-seat places because 'Whip It' became so big, so fast." This included a three-night run at the Santa Monica Civic Auditorium.

== Legacy ==
On September 16, 2009, Warner Bros. and Devo announced vinyl and deluxe CD re-releases of both Q: Are We Not Men? A: We Are Devo! and Freedom of Choice, as well as a tour in which they would perform both albums on back-to-back nights in selected cities. On December 22, 2009, the Ultra Devo-Lux Ltd. Edition box set was released, which featured the remastered versions of Q: Are We Not Men? and Freedom of Choice with bonus tracks, a DVD of the 2009 Q: Are We Not Men? HMV Forum concert, a DVD of music videos, a 7-inch single and a poster.

In 2008, Richard Buskin of Sound on Sound observed that "Devo and Robert Margouleff crafted a record that was not only more musically cohesive than the first two albums, but also boasted a greater level of sophistication, as the synthesizers blended with guitars to create a more dehumanised yet less dissonant sound." In 2015, David Chiu of PopMatters commented on "Whip It"'s "surrealist and now-iconic video that was a staple of MTV during the then-fledging channel's early years". He added, "The fact that The Simpsons even paid homage to both the song and the video in an episode demonstrates how much 'Whip It' has transcended pop culture." Also that year, Nagy wrote a book on the making of the album for the 33⅓ series, including interviews with Casale and Mark and Bob Mothersbaugh, a song by song breakdown and a foreword by Fred Armisen.

== Track listing ==
Side one
No.	Title	Writer(s)	Length
1.	"Girl U Want"	Mark Mothersbaugh, Gerald Casale	2:55
2.	"It's Not Right"	M. Mothersbaugh	2:20
3.	"Whip It"	M. Mothersbaugh, G. Casale	2:37
4.	"Snowball"	M. Mothersbaugh, G. Casale	2:28
5.	"Ton o' Luv"	G. Casale	2:29
6.	"Freedom of Choice"	M. Mothersbaugh, G. Casale	3:28

Side two
No.	Title	Writer(s)	Length
1.	"Gates of Steel"	G. Casale, M. Mothersbaugh, Sue Schmidt, Debbie Smith	3:26
2.	"Cold War"	Bob Mothersbaugh, G. Casale	2:30
3.	"Don't You Know"	M. Mothersbaugh	2:14
4.	"That's Pep!"	M. Mothersbaugh	2:17
5.	"Mr. B's Ballroom"	M. Mothersbaugh	2:45
6.	"Planet Earth"	G. Casale	2:45
Total length:			32:14

2009 Warner Bros. CD bonus tracks
No.	Title	Writer(s)	Length
13.	"Freedom of Choice Theme Song" (Live)	M. Mothersbaugh, G. Casale	2:46
14.	"Whip It" (Live)	M. Mothersbaugh, G. Casale	2:41
15.	"Girl U Want" (Live)	M. Mothersbaugh, G. Casale	2:56
16.	"Gates of Steel" (Live)	G. Casale, M. Mothersbaugh, Schmidt, Smith	3:17
17.	"Be Stiff" (Live)	G. Casale, Robert Lewis	2:50
18.	"Planet Earth" (Live)	G. Casale	2:32

- These bonus tracks constitute the DEV-O Live EP.

== Personnel ==
Credits adapted from Pioneers Who Got Scalped: The Anthology CD liner notes.

Devo

- Mark Mothersbaugh – vocals, keyboards, guitar
- Gerald Casale – vocals, bass guitar, keyboards
- Bob Mothersbaugh – lead guitar, vocals
- Bob Casale – rhythm guitar, keyboards, vocals
- Alan Myers – drums

Credits adapted from the original album's liner notes:

Technical

- Devo – producer
- Robert Margouleff – producer, engineer
- Howard Siegal – engineer
- Karat Faye – assistant engineer
- Ken Perry – mastering
- Artrouble – album cover

== Charts ==
=== Weekly charts ===
Chart (1980–1981)	Peak position
Australian Albums (Kent Music Report)	5
Canada Top Albums/CDs (RPM)	75
New Zealand Albums (RMNZ)	9
UK Albums (Official Charts)	47
US Billboard 200	22

=== Year-end charts ===
Chart (1980)	Position
New Zealand Albums (RMNZ)	49

Chart (1981)	Position
New Zealand Albums (RMNZ)	21
US Billboard 200	64

== Certifications ==
Region	Certification	Certified units/sales
Canada (Music Canada)	Gold	50,000^{^}
New Zealand (RMNZ)	Platinum	15,000^{^}
United States (RIAA)	Platinum	1,000,000^{^}
^{^} Shipments figures based on certification alone.

== Bibliography ==
- Devo (2018a). DEVO: The Brand. London: Rocket 88 Books Publishing. ISBN 978-1-910978-01-6.
- Devo (2018b). DEVO: Unmasked. London: Rocket 88 Books Publishing. ISBN 978-1-910978-01-6.
