= Duty Now for the Future =

Studio album by Devo
- Released: June 1, 1979
- Recorded: September 1978 – early 1979
- Studios: Chateau Recorders, Hollywood
- Genres: New wave; post-punk; art pop
- Length: 38:56
- Label: Warner Bros.
- Producer: Ken Scott

Devo chronology
Q: Are We Not Men? A: We Are Devo! (1978)	Duty Now for the Future (1979)	Freedom of Choice (1980)

Singles from Duty Now For the Future
- 1. "The Day My Baby Gave Me a Surprize" Released: 1979; 2. "Secret Agent Man" Released: 1979

Alternative cover
- International cover

Duty Now for the Future is the second studio album by American new wave band Devo, released on June 1, 1979, by Warner Bros. Records. Produced by Ken Scott, the album was recorded between September 1978 and early 1979 at Chateau Recorders in Hollywood.

== Composition ==
Both Duty Now for the Future and its predecessor, Q: Are We Not Men? A: We Are Devo! (1978), contained material from a backlog of songs the band had written between 1974 and 1977. By December 1976, Devo were already performing "Clockout", "Timing X" and "Blockhead" live, following the expansion of the band's line-up from a quartet to a quintet, with the addition of drummer Alan Myers (replacing Jim Mothersbaugh) and multi-instrumentalist Bob Casale. Performances of "Clockout" took advantage of this newly expanded line-up and featured Bob Casale playing bass instead of Gerald Casale. "Smart Patrol/Mr. DNA" was already being performed by November 1977.

The song selections for the band's first two albums were devised well ahead of time, with Duty Now for the Future's track-listing originally going to contain "Soo Bawls", "Gates of Steel", and "Space Junk". "Space Junk" ended up appearing on their debut album, with "Soo Bawls" and "Gates of Steel" being dropped in favor of three new compositions Mark Mothersbaugh brought in ("The Day My Baby Gave Me a Surprize", "S.I.B. (Swelling Itching Brain)" and "Triumph of the Will") for the album's sessions. Bob Mothersbaugh later stated that "We had been touring extensively after the first album; maybe we rushed to get another album out." In a 2015 interview, Gerald Casale said that the new material "was kind of still incubating and probably wasn't ready" at the time of recording.

"Devo Corporate Anthem" and its accompanying video were a nod to the 1975 film Rollerball, in which the titular sport is preceded by players and the audience standing solemnly while listening to a regional "corporate hymn". "Triumph of the Will" takes its title from Leni Riefenstahl's Nazi propaganda film of the same name, although the song is about desire. Music historian Andy Zax stated that, "On the surface, 'The Day My Baby Gave Me a Surprize' seems like one of Devo's happiest, bounciest pop confections, but a closer look reveals peculiar things lurking beneath."

== Production and recording ==
Duty Now for the Future was produced by Ken Scott. Like Brian Eno, who had produced Q: Are We Not Men? A: We Are Devo!, Scott had also worked with David Bowie, most notably on The Rise and Fall of Ziggy Stardust and the Spiders from Mars (1972) and Aladdin Sane (1973). According to Scott, Devo were "quite professional in the studio" and he "loved every minute" of the sessions.

Recording for the album began in September 1978, a month after the release of their first album. Scott discussed his role in the recordings and how Devo came to choose him for the album: "I know they chose me because of the Bowie records I did, but I don't know if it was a direct recommendation from Mr. Jones. Devo always wanted to learn. That's why they worked with each producer only once."

Duty Now for the Future found the band bringing synthesizers more into the forefront than before. Additionally, guitar sounds were often manipulated; in a 1979 interview with BAM magazine, Gerald Casale stated, "A guitar can only do what a guitar does. It's like only one tiny piece of a synthesizer. On this album, we did much more with the guitars, too. Sometimes you don't know that they're guitars." The band's cover of Johnny Rivers' "Secret Agent Man" features a rare lead vocal from Bob Mothersbaugh. According to Scott, to record the solo for "Secret Agent Man", they "overloaded mic amps and fed the signal through headphones which were taped to the mic."

Several band members voiced dissatisfaction with the sound of the album in retrospect. Gerald Casale has stated that "Scott wanted something processed. We wanted something aggressive." Bob Mothersbaugh felt that Scott did not understand the band's "ideas and vision." Mark Mothersbaugh recalled that, at the time, he thought Scott had erred in recording the album one instrument at a time to a click track—to emphasize the band's tight, robotic qualities—rather than recapturing their live sound. Mothersbaugh ultimately felt that the results were not as satisfying as playing the material on the following tour. However, Casale later stated that Mothersbaugh, who loved synthesizers, had already wanted to move the band away from guitars.

The band were excluded from the final mixing process, with Casale later stating that they "barely knew how bland it sounded", and that, for the most part, Scott did not take their suggestions.

== Artwork and packaging ==
The artwork was designed by Janet Perr, based on a concept by Devo. Universal Product Codes were a then-new phenomenon and the band devised a satirical fake code for the front cover. The cover also featured a punch-out postcard, which according to Mark Mothersbaugh was "a piece of art that you could take away, a repurposed album cover." Although Warner Bros. originally rejected the idea, saying it was too costly, Devo instructed the label to use the band's own money to pay for it.

The cover photograph of the band was taken by photographer Allan Tannenbaum for the SoHo Weekly News in New York City. It was used in the album artwork by simply taking it from the front page of the newspaper in the exact same dimensions, unbeknownst to the photographer. When he discovered this, he contacted the record company and was paid for its use.

The "Science Boy" logo was designed by George L. Kaufman in 1956 for the Cleveland Press newspaper's "Science Emblem" contest. The logo was rediscovered by Gerald Casale and Mark Mothersbaugh in 1976 on a pamphlet in Akron and the two began using it in their own art, accompanied by the phrase "Duty Now for the Future", coined by Casale. After first using it on a promotional item for Virgin Records, the band were contacted by the owners of the logo, which resulted in them acquiring the rights to the image. Casale was seemingly unaware of the author of the design until being contacted by Kaufman's son in 2024, after which a post was made to Devo's social media to commemorate him for his work.

The inner sleeve included the lyrics of all the songs printed in a single block of closely printed text. The sleeve also featured a West Hollywood address from which one could request information and news about the band. In addition, an address was included to allow purchasers to order a copy of the Devo-vision videocassette from Time Life. This tape was never actually made available and was issued a few years later under the title The Men Who Make the Music via Warner Home Video.

The artwork used on Virgin pressings of the album in the UK, which prominently featured the "Science Boy" logo on the cover, was created by John Zabrucky, again based on a concept by Devo, with graphic co-ordination by Malcolm Garrett. Initial pressings of the Virgin album also featured the US cover postcard as an insert.

== Promotion ==
Devo produced one music video for this album. "The Day My Baby Gave Me a Surprize" combined animation with blue screen effects of the band performing. In this video, Devo chiefly wore white shirts and pants and silver 3D glasses. The video also features Alex Mothersbaugh, the daughter of Bob Mothersbaugh. Alex would later be featured on the back cover of Devo's 1984 album Shout.

A short clip of the band standing at attention and then saluting was filmed to accompany "Devo Corporate Anthem", which was used in concert performance.

== Reception ==
Professional ratings
Review scores
Source	Rating
AllMusic	3.5/5 stars
Christgau's Record Guide	B−
The Daily Vault	A
The Encyclopedia of Popular Music	3/5 stars
MusicHound Rock: The Essential Album Guide	2/5 stars
Pitchfork	6.6/10
The Rolling Stone Album Guide	3/5 stars
Smash Hits	6/10
Spin Alternative Record Guide	8/10

=== Commercial ===
Duty Now for the Future was on the Billboard charts for 10 weeks, peaking at No. 73. In Canada, the album reached number 87.

=== Critical ===
Dave Marsh, writing in Rolling Stone, condemned the album, feeling that "inspired amateurism works only when the players aspire to something better." Robert Christgau of The Village Voice panned side one as "dire" and "arena-rock", but felt that "The Day My Baby Gave Me a Surprize" and "Secret Agent Man" were "as bright as anything on the debut, and the arrangements offer their share of surprizes." Red Starr of Smash Hits described it as "unimpressive", but noted that the "change of style definitely grows on you". They went on to say that, although the album was more accessible, it was "lacking the zany magic of old".

Scott Isler of Trouser Press stated that the album "doesn't score as many bull's-eyes as the first but includes two anthems of malaise, 'Blockhead' and 'S.I.B. (Swelling Itching Brain)'", and noted the band's "disturbing signs of portentousness". The Boston Globe dismissed Duty Now for the Future as "largely a failure." Among positive reviews, The New York Times deemed the album "undeniably catchy and fun."

In a retrospective review for AllMusic, reviewer Mark Deming opined that the album "captures the group in the midst of a significant stylistic shift", while contending that "Triumph of the Will" "embraces fascism as a satirical target without bothering to make it sound as if they disapprove."

== Track listing ==
Side one
No.	Title	Writer(s)	Length
1.	"Devo Corporate Anthem"	Mark Mothersbaugh	1:16
2.	"Clockout"	Gerald Casale	2:48
3.	"Timing X"	M. Mothersbaugh	1:13
4.	"Wiggly World"	Bob Mothersbaugh, G. Casale	2:45
5.	"Blockhead"	B. Mothersbaugh, M. Mothersbaugh	3:00
6.	"Strange Pursuit"	G. Casale, M. Mothersbaugh	2:45
7.	"S.I.B. (Swelling Itching Brain)"	M. Mothersbaugh	4:27

Side two
No.	Title	Writer(s)	Length
1.	"Triumph of the Will"	M. Mothersbaugh, G. Casale	2:19
2.	"The Day My Baby Gave Me a Surprize"	M. Mothersbaugh	2:42
3.	"Pink Pussycat"	M. Mothersbaugh, B. Mothersbaugh	3:12
4.	"Secret Agent Man"	P. F. Sloan, Steve Barri; arr. M. Mothersbaugh	3:37
5.	"Smart Patrol"/"Mr. DNA"	G. Casale / G. Casale, M. Mothersbaugh	6:06
6.	"Red Eye"	M. Mothersbaugh, G. Casale	2:50
Total length:			38:56

== Personnel ==
Credits adapted from Pioneers Who Got Scalped: The Anthology CD liner notes:

Devo

- Mark Mothersbaugh – vocals, keyboards, guitar
- Gerald Casale – vocals, bass guitar, keyboards
- Bob Mothersbaugh – lead guitar, vocals; lead vocals on "Secret Agent Man"
- Bob Casale – rhythm guitar, keyboards, vocals
- Alan Myers – drums

Credits adapted from the original album's liner notes, except where noted:

Technical

- Ken Scott – producer, engineer
- Brian Leshon – assistant engineer
- Phil Jost – assistant engineer
- Bernie Grundman – mastering
- Janet Perr – cover art
- Devo Inc. – graphic concept, package design
- Yale Greenfield – dust sleeve production stills
- George L. Kaufman – "Science Boy" design

== Charts ==
Chart (1979)	Peak position
Australian Albums (Kent Music Report)	51
Canada Top Albums/CDs (RPM)	87
New Zealand Albums (RMNZ)	13
UK Albums (Official Charts)	49
US Billboard 200	73
