= Q. Are We Not Men? A: We Are Devo! =

1978 studio album by Devo

Q: Are We Not Men? A: We Are Devo!

Studio album by Devo
- Released: August 28, 1978
- Recorded: October 1977, February 1978
- Studios: Conny Plank's studio (Cologne, West Germany); Different Fur (San Francisco, California)
- Genres: New wave; post-punk; art rock; punk rock
- Length: 34:24
- Labels: Warner Bros. (US); Virgin (UK)
- Producer: Brian Eno

Devo chronology
| Mechanical Man EP (1977) | Q: Are We Not Men? A: We Are Devo! (1978) | Duty Now for the Future (1979) |

Singles from Q: Are We Not Men? A: We Are Devo!
- 1. "(I Can't Get No) Satisfaction" Released: September 1977; 2. "Jocko Homo" Released: February 1978; 3. "Come Back Jonee" Released: August 1978

Alternative cover
- European cover

Q: Are We Not Men? A: We Are Devo! is the debut studio album by American new wave band Devo. It was released in August 1978 on Warner Bros. in North America and Virgin Records in Europe. Produced by Brian Eno, the album was recorded from October 1977 to February 1978, primarily in Cologne, West Germany.

The album peaked at No. 78 on the U.S. Billboard chart and No. 12 on the UK Albums Chart. Retrospectively, the album has been included on several "best of" lists from publications, including Rolling Stone, Pitchfork, and Spin.

== Production and recording ==
=== Composition ===
Mark Mothersbaugh, Gerald Casale, and Bob Mothersbaugh wrote the album from 1974 to 1977. "Jocko Homo", written by Mark Mothersbaugh, was demoed in 1974 and first played live on October 31, 1975. During this period, Devo were a quartet consisting of Mark Mothersbaugh, Gerald Casale, Bob Mothersbaugh, and drummer Jim Mothersbaugh. In 1976, Alan Myers replaced Jim Mothersbaugh, and Bob Casale ("Bob 2") re-joined as rhythm guitarist and additional keyboardist following a two-year absence. By February 1977, Devo were also performing "Shrivel-Up" live, as well as early versions of "Uncontrollable Urge," "Praying Hands," "Mongoloid," "Too Much Paranoias," and "Jocko Homo." In March 1977, Devo released their first single, a self-produced recording of "Mongoloid" / "Jocko Homo".

By May 19, 1977, the group had debuted all of the album's tracks live, and developed the material throughout the year.

=== Production ===
In 1977, David Bowie and Iggy Pop received a tape of Devo demo songs from the wife of Michael Aylward, guitarist in the band Tin Huey. Both Pop and Bowie, as well as Brian Eno and Robert Fripp, expressed interest in producing Devo's first release. In October 1977, Patrick Gleeson invited the band to record "Come Back Jonee" and "Shrivel-Up" at his Different Fur studio in San Francisco. The following month, Devo returned to New York and were introduced ahead of a show at Max's Kansas City by Bowie, who told the audience that he planned to produce Devo's first album in Tokyo over the winter.

Eventually, Eno was chosen to produce the album at Conny Plank's studio near Cologne after a series of engagements prevented Bowie from undertaking the recording. The band were flown to Germany in February 1978. Bowie was busy filming Just a Gigolo at the time, but assisted Eno on weekends. Since Devo had not yet been signed to a record label, Eno paid for the flights and studio cost of the band, confident that they would be signed; in return, he asked for a share of any subsequent deals. The Different Fur recordings of "Come Back Jonee" and "Shrivel-Up" had been overdubbed upon during these sessions.

Gerald Casale was not present for the first day of recording because he had missed the flight. With their bassist missing, the rest of the group spent the day playing with Eno, Bowie, Holger Czukay of Can, and Dieter Moebius of Cluster and Harmonia.

The recording sessions were a source of frustration for Eno and Devo. Eno found the band unwilling to experiment or deviate from the sound of their demo recordings. Devo later admitted that "we were overtly resistant to Eno's ideas. He made up synth parts and really cool sounds for almost every part of the album, but we used them on three or four songs." After conflicts arose between the group and Eno, Bowie was brought in to remix the album.

Outtakes included "Be Stiff", released as a non-album single that same year; "Social Fools", released as the B-side to "Come Back Jonee"; and "Penetration in the Centrefold", released as the B-side to "The Day My Baby Gave Me a Surprize" from the follow-up album Duty Now for the Future in 1979.

== Artwork and packaging ==
The cover was illustrated by Joe Heiner, based on an image of golfer Chi-Chi Rodríguez that the band had found on a golf strap. According to Casale, David Berman at Warner Bros., decided that the image could not be used because "he was a golf fan and felt we were making fun of Chi Chi." The band offered to contact Rodriguez personally but had time constraints due to the forthcoming production of their album. Rick Serini, the manager of the company's art department, recommended an artist who could airbrush and alter the face of the picture, and lead singer Mark Mothersbaugh offered a picture he had procured from a local newspaper that morphed the faces of U.S. presidents John F. Kennedy, Lyndon B. Johnson, Richard Nixon, and Gerald Ford. These ideas were morphed with the original image of Rodríguez to create the cover art of the album.

The band did get Rodríguez's permission to use the original photograph. Because the "morphed" album sleeves were in production, Serini claimed it would cost the band $2,500 to halt production and reinstate the image intended originally by the band, which forced the band to keep the morphed version. Casale said "we were able to come out with something that by the corporate interference and misunderstanding of the business side of Warner Bros. Records, actually unwittingly produced something far more Devo than the original image." The original cover illustration, with Rodriguez's face intact, appeared on the picture sleeve for the single "Be Stiff".

The European version had completely different artwork, featuring stills taken from the band's short film The Truth About De-Evolution. The front cover of the European version depicts Mark Mothersbaugh wearing goggles, a bow tie, and rubber gloves, and the back cover features Gerald Casale, Jim Mothersbaugh, and Bob Mothersbaugh wearing sunglasses under nylon stockings.

== Release ==
Devo received offers to release Q: Are We Not Men? A: We Are Devo! from Warner Bros., Island, Virgin and David Bowie's Bewlay Brothers. Virgin obtained the rights to release the album in the United Kingdom, while Warner Bros. held the rights for North America. The album was originally planned for a spring 1978 release, but had to be delayed due to legal disputes between Warner and Virgin. It was released by Warner in the United States on August 28, 1978 and by Virgin in the United Kingdom on September 1, 1978. Virgin also released a picture disc version of the album, illustrated with a still from The Truth About De-Evolution.

== Reception ==
=== Commercial ===
In the United States, Q: Are We Not Men? A: We Are Devo! peaked at No. 78 on the Billboard charts, and in the United Kingdom, it entered the charts on September 16, 1978 and remained there for seven weeks, peaking at No. 12. Q: Are We Not Men? A: We Are Devo! was also successful in Japan. The album went "silver" in the United Kingdom on January 15, 1979, and "gold" in the United States on July 27, 2001.

=== Critical ===
Professional ratings
Review scores
| Source | Rating |
|---|---|
| AllMusic | 4.5/5 stars |
| The Encyclopedia of Popular Music | 4/5 stars |
| The Rolling Stone Album Guide | 4/5 stars |
| Spin Alternative Record Guide | 9/10 |
| The Village Voice | B+ |

Tom Carson, writing in Rolling Stone, wrote that "There's not an ounce of feeling anywhere, and the only commitment is to the distancing aesthetic of the put-on", and opined that "Devo lacks most of Eno's warmth and much of Bowie's flair for mechanized melodrama. For all its idiosyncrasies, the music here is utterly impersonal." Record World wrote that the single "Come Back Jonee" "utilizes [Devo's] unique tongue-in-cheek approach to its maximum" and praised Eno's production. Robert Christgau of The Village Voice reacted with muted praise, highlighting Devo's "catchy, comical, herky-jerky rock and roll" and concluding: "In small doses it's as good as novelty music ever gets, and there isn't a really bad cut on this album. But it leads nowhere." Nonetheless, it was voted one of the best albums of the year in The Village Voice's Pazz & Jop critics poll for 1978. In January 1980, Trouser Press also named it one of the best albums of 1978. In a retrospective review, Steve Huey of AllMusic deemed it "arguably Devo's strongest set of material" and "a seminal touchstone in the development of American new wave."

== Tour ==
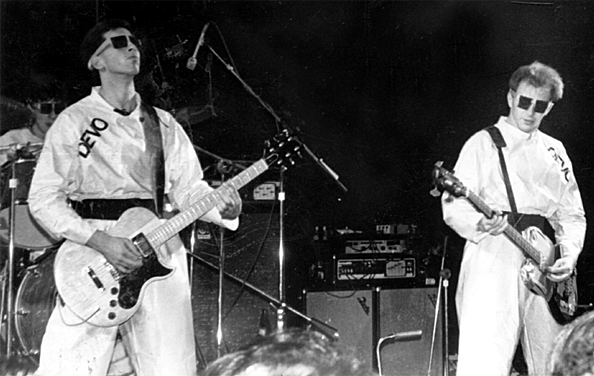
Live performance in Atlanta, Georgia, 1978: Bob Casale and Gerald Casale

To support the album, Devo undertook a lengthy world tour, lasting from October 1978 to June 1979. The look of the tour was largely based around the live act they'd been developing throughout the previous year, with the only differences being the increased budget allowing for higher quality costumes and a basic set, and a focus on the album's material, whilst teasing then unreleased songs for the next album.

The show would open with The Truth About De-Evolution, followed by their 1978 promo videos for "Satisfaction" and "Come Back Jonee". When the band arrived on stage, they performed two songs that were not on the album supporting the tour. Then Mark Mothersbaugh would get a modified electric guitar, which would be used for the songs "Satisfaction" and "Too Much Paranoias".

As the show would continue, the group's signature yellow suits would be gradually torn, until "Jocko Homo", where Devo would strip down to black shorts and T-shirts with knee and shoulder pads. During the intro to "Smart Patrol", the group donned orange helmets, which were shaken off during the next song, "Mr. DNA". The show was ultimately concluded with lead singer Mark Mothersbaugh becoming Booji Boy and singing "Red Eye" and "The Words Get Stuck in My Throat".

== Legacy ==
Q: Are We Not Men? A: We Are Devo! has been featured on several "best of" lists, including Spin's 2001 list of the "50 Most Essential Punk Records" and Pitchfork]'s 2004 list of the 100 best albums of the 1970s. It was ranked number 447 in Rolling Stone's 2003 list of the 500 Greatest Albums of All Time, climbing to number 442 in the 2012 update and then to number 252 in the 2020 version of the list. It is also listed in the book 1001 Albums You Must Hear Before You Die.

On May 6, 2009, Devo performed the album live in its entirety for the first time at the Forum in Kentish Town, London as part of the All Tomorrow's Parties festival's Don't Look Back concert series. On September 16, Warner Bros. and Devo announced vinyl and deluxe CD re-releases of both Q: Are We Not Men? and Freedom of Choice, as well as a tour in which they would perform both albums on back-to-back nights in selected cities. On December 22, the Ultra Devo-Lux Ltd. Edition box set was released, which featured the remastered versions of Q: Are We Not Men? and Freedom of Choice with bonus tracks, a DVD of the Don't Look Back concert, a DVD of music videos, a 7-inch single, and a poster.

The album's opening track, "Uncontrollable Urge", has been used in several films and television shows, including The Wolf of Wall Street, Fun with Dick and Jane,, Outer Banks, Ridiculousness (as a cover along with Mark Mothersbaugh and "yeahs" provided by Rob Dyrdek) and Jackass. "Gut Feeling" appeared in the 2004 film The Life Aquatic with Steve Zissou, as well as the 2007 video game skate. The album was covered in full by Claw Hammer in 1991.

In 2016, Paste named the album as the 22nd-best post-punk release of all time. Staff writer Garrett Martin wrote: "I think I was 16 when I realized Devo wasn't a jokey one-hit wonder but one of the greatest rock bands of all time...If I had heard the spastic art rock of Are We Not Men? first I never would've doubted them. It's not their best album, but it's the best at convincing serious young rock nerds that Devo were more than a silly footnote." In 2025, Casale said Devo had contacted Eno about the idea of releasing a remixed album including the parts Devo removed, but did not receive a reply.

== Track listing ==
Side one
| No. | Title | Writer(s) | Length |
|---|---|---|---|
| 1. | "Uncontrollable Urge" | Mark Mothersbaugh | 3:09 |
| 2. | "(I Can't Get No) Satisfaction" | Mick Jagger, Keith Richards | 2:40 |
| 3. | "Praying Hands" | Gerald Casale, M. Mothersbaugh | 2:47 |
| 4. | "Space Junk" | G. Casale, Bob Mothersbaugh | 2:14 |
| 5. | "Mongoloid" | G. Casale | 3:44 |
| 6. | "Jocko Homo" | M. Mothersbaugh | 3:40 |

Side two
| No. | Title | Writer(s) | Length |
|---|---|---|---|
| 1. | "Too Much Paranoias" | M. Mothersbaugh | 1:57 |
| 2. | "Gut Feeling" / "(Slap Your Mammy)" | M. Mothersbaugh, B. Mothersbaugh / G. Casale | 4:54 |
| 3. | "Come Back Jonee" | G. Casale, M. Mothersbaugh | 3:47 |
| 4. | "Sloppy (I Saw My Baby Gettin')" | M. Mothersbaugh, B. Mothersbaugh, G. Casale, Gary Jackett | 2:40 |
| 5. | "Shrivel-Up" | G. Casale, M. Mothersbaugh, B. Mothersbaugh | 3:05 |
| Total length: | | | 34:24 |

2009 Warner Bros. CD bonus tracks
| No. | Title | Writer(s) | Length |
|---|---|---|---|
| 12. | "Uncontrollable Urge" (Live) | M. Mothersbaugh | 3:32 |
| 13. | "(I Can't Get No) Satisfaction" (Live) | Jagger, Richards | 3:15 |
| 14. | "Praying Hands" (Live) | G. Casale, M. Mothersbaugh | 3:30 |
| 15. | "Space Junk" (Live) | G. Casale, B. Mothersbaugh | 2:35 |
| 16. | "Mongoloid" (Live) | G. Casale | 4:53 |
| 17. | "Jocko Homo" (Live) | M. Mothersbaugh | 4:45 |
| 18. | "Too Much Paranoias" (Live) | M. Mothersbaugh | 2:34 |
| 19. | "Gut Feeling" / "(Slap Your Mammy)" (Live) | M. Mothersbaugh, B. Mothersbaugh / G. Casale | 4:25 |
| 20. | "Come Back Jonee" (Live) | G. Casale, M. Mothersbaugh | 4:27 |
| 21. | "Sloppy (I Saw My Baby Gettin')" (Live) | M. Mothersbaugh, B. Mothersbaugh, G. Casale, Jackett | 2:32 |
| 22. | "Shrivel-Up" (Live) | G. Casale, M. Mothersbaugh, B. Mothersbaugh | 3:19 |

- These performances are culled from the Q: Are We Not Men? A: We Are DEVO! anniversary concert performed at the HMV Forum in London on May 6, 2009.

== Personnel ==
Credits adapted from Pioneers Who Got Scalped: The Anthology CD liner notes:

Devo

- Mark Mothersbaugh – vocals, keyboards, guitar
- Gerald Casale – vocals, bass guitar, keyboards
- Bob Mothersbaugh – lead guitar, vocals
- Bob Casale – rhythm guitar, keyboards, vocals
- Alan Myers – drums

Credits adapted from the original album's liner notes (except where noted):

Technical

- Brian Eno – producer, synthesizer, backing vocals
- Conny Plank – engineer (1–8, 10), mixing
- Patrick Gleeson – engineer (9, 11)
- Bobbi Watson – production photograph
- Devo Inc. – devolved Computa-posite cover graphic, graphic concept and execution
- John Cabalka – graphic supervision
- Erik Munsön – package production design
- David Bowie – additional production and mixing

== Charts ==
| Chart (1978–1979) | Peak position |
|---|---|
| Australian Albums (Kent Music Report) | 57 |
| New Zealand Albums (RMNZ) | 7 |
| UK Albums (Official Charts) | 12 |
| US Billboard 200 | 78 |

== Certifications ==
| Region | Certification | Certified units/sales |
|---|---|---|
| United Kingdom (BPI) | Silver | 60,000^{^} |
| United States (RIAA) | Gold | 500,000^{^} |
^{^} Shipments figures based on certification alone.

== Notes ==
=== References ===
- Reynolds, Simon (2006). Rip it Up and Start Again: Postpunk 1978–1984. Penguin. ISBN 0-14-303672-6.
- Howard, David N. (2004). Sonic Alchemy: Visionary Music Producers and Their Maverick Recordings. Hal Leonard. ISBN 0-634-05560-7.
- Adams, Deanna R. (2002). Rock 'n' Roll and the Cleveland Connection. Kent State University Press. ISBN 0-87338-691-4.
- Sandford, Christopher (1998). Bowie: Loving the Alien. Da Capo Press. ISBN 0-306-80854-4.
- Warwick, Neil; Kutner, Jon; Brown, Tony (2004). The Complete Book of the British Charts: Singles and Albums. Omnibus Press. ISBN 1-84449-058-0.
- Buckley, Peter (2003). The Rough Guide to Rock. Rough Guides. ISBN 1-84353-105-4.
- Strong, M. C. (1998). The Great Rock Discography. Giunti Editore. ISBN 88-09-21522-2.
