= Worried Man Blues =

Traditional song

"Worried Man Blues" is a folk song in the roots music repertoire. It is catalogued as Roud Folk Song Index No. 4753. Like many folk songs passed by oral tradition, the lyrics vary from version to version, but generally all contain the chorus "It takes a worried man to sing a worried song/It takes a worried man to sing a worried song/I'm worried now, but I won't be worried long." The verses tell the story of a man imprisoned for unknown reasons "I went across the river, and I lay down to sleep/When I woke up, had shackles on my feet", who pines for his lost love, who is "on the train and gone."

== Notable recordings and performances ==
The Carter Family recorded this song for the Victor Talking Machine Company in 1930.

The song was recorded by Woody Guthrie in 1940, and in the years that followed by his sometime singing partners Cisco Houston Burl Ives, Ramblin' Jack Elliott (with Derroll Adams), and Pete Seeger. It was included by Seeger in his 1955 Folksinger's Guitar Guide instruction record and booklet (Folkways CRB1) as well as his concerts throughout the 1960s. Lonnie Donegan and his band released a skiffle arrangement in 1955, with vocals by Dickie Bishop, paying homage to Guthrie and Houston in a later interview. The Kingston Trio wrote new verses centering on the daily life of a married suburban businessmen and recorded it in 1959 as "A Worried Man", while Lester Flatt and Earl Scruggs included it on their 1961 Foggy Mountain Boys Songs Of The Famous Carter Family album with Maybelle Carter. June Carter and Johnny Cash sang the song with Pete Seeger on the final episode of his Rainbow Quest television series in 1966, and performed it in concerts and on the later Johnny Cash Show TV series. The song has been performed by many bluegrass, folk and country artists, including The Stanley Brothers, Osborne Brothers, Tom Jones, George Jones, and even by Devo, Van Morrison, Elliott Murphy, and numerous others.

"Worried Man Blues" performed by George Jones is the first song on the album The Unbroken Circle: The Musical Heritage of the Carter Family released in 2004.

Devo's song "It Takes a Worried Man", a.k.a. "Worried Man Blues", was recorded and filmed with the band playing radioactive waste garbage men in the 1982 film Human Highway.

Half Man Half Biscuit included a version on their 2001 EP Editor's Recommendation. It also appears on their 2016 compilation album ...And some fell on stony ground.

It features on Paolo Nutini's 2009 album Sunny Side Up.

== References by other artists ==
Numerous blues artists (including Big Bill Broonzy, Sam Collins, Blind Boy Fuller, Tampa Red, Sonny Terry, and Big Joe Williams) have recorded songs with titles similar to "Worried Man Blues", but with entirely different lyrics and melody. Shortly after the Carter Family recording, the duo Steve Ledford and Daniel Nicholson accompanied by the Carolina Ramblers String Band recorded a "Worried Man Blues" in New York in 1932, possibly more similar to the Carters' song than the other blues records, but discography listings do not include the lyrics.

The song is quoted by The Doctor in the 1978 Doctor Who story The Stones of Blood: "the professor is a worried man, and a worried man sings".

In their 1995 song "Rollerkoaster", indie band Railroad Jerk references "Worried Man Blues" in the refrain, as Marcellus Hall sings "It takes a worried man to sing a worried song, and I'm not one of 'em!"

In Beck's 1996 song "Hotwax", he sings "It takes a backwash man to sing a backwash song".

The band Old 97's, in their 1997 song "Big Brown Eyes", include the line "It takes a worried man to sing a worried song".

The Squirrel Nut Zippers' 2009 song "It Happens All the Time" contains the line "It takes a worried man to sing a worried song".

In Joan North's 1967 children's book The Whirling Shapes, all the characters sing this song.
