= Mongoloid (song) =

- 1977 Booji Boy Records release of "Mongoloid", backed with "Jocko Homo"

Single by Devo

from the album Be Stiff EP
- B-side: "Jocko Homo"
- Released: March 12, 1977
- Recorded: February 1977
- Genre: Punk rock; experimental rock
- Length: 3:30 (1977 single version); 3:44 (1978 album version)
- Label: Booji Boy
- Songwriter: Gerald Casale
- Producers: Brian Eno; Devo

Devo singles chronology
| "Mongoloid" (1977) | "(I Can't Get No) Satisfaction" (1977) |

"Mongoloid" is the first single released by American new wave band Devo in 1977, on the Booji Boy Records label. It was backed with the song "Jocko Homo". "Mongoloid" also had one of the first music videos made using collage. "Mongoloid" was later re-recorded by Devo and appeared on their debut studio album Q: Are We Not Men? A: We Are Devo! in 1978. It is also a staple of Devo's live shows.

== Composition and lyrics ==
"Mongoloid" has been described as punk rock and avant-rock. Like many of Devo's early songs, it was built on a motorik beat. The song opens with a 4/4 electric bass line, which is then joined by drums, and electric guitar. Over this, a swooping overdubbed synthesizer line featuring frequent pitch bend is played on Minimoog. The synth is not used as a lead instrument during the song, and is used only in the opening and closing. The doubled vocals are sung simultaneously by both Gerald V. Casale and Robert "Bob 1" Mothersbaugh. On the original single, the vocals are deliberately sung in a nasal fashion.

The lyrics describe a man with Down syndrome who leads a normal life in a de-evolved society, hence the lyric "He was a mongoloid, mongoloid / His friends were unaware / Mongoloid, he was a mongoloid / Nobody even cared".

== Music video ==
"Mongoloid" was Devo's second music video, after The Truth About De-Evolution. It was not actually made by the band, but by assemblage artist and experimental filmmaker Bruce Conner. Conner combined 1950s television advertisements, science fiction film clips (including a scene from It Came from Outer Space), and scientific documentaries with abstract animation and original film work. Devo marketed the film as "A documentary film exploring the manner in which a determined young man overcame a basic mental defect and became a useful member of society. Insightful editing techniques reveal the dreams, ideals and problems that face a large segment of the American male population. Very educational. Background music written and performed by the DEVO orchestra."

"Mongoloid" appears as a bonus feature on The Complete Truth About De-Evolution DVD.

== Discography ==
"Mongoloid" was originally recorded as a single released on the Booji Boy Records label in 1977. The original single was a triple gatefold, held together with stickers. The inside of the gatefold displayed the lyrics of the two songs in either blue or black ink depending on the pressing. The back cover of the single was an image of Booji Boy with the text "We're all Devo! Booji Boy XO."

As Devo gained fame, Stiff Records in the UK agreed to release the single on their label. There were several pressings of the "Mongoloid" single with varying packages, ranging from a full triple gatefold, to a simple picture sleeve, to a generic "Stiff Records" paper sleeve. The Stiff Records releases are marked by the Stiff logo in the lower left hand corner of the front cover.

Both songs featured on the single were re-recorded for the band's debut album Are We Not Men? We Are Devo!. The original single versions can be found on the Pioneers Who Got Scalped anthology.

== Tour ==
In order to promote the single, Devo undertook a 'tour' using their limited budget to promote it.

| Date | Venue | Note |
1976
| 12/10/1976 | The Crypt, Akron, OH | |
| 12/11/1976 | The Crypt, Akron, OH | |
| 12/17/1976 | The Crypt, Akron, OH | Opening for Pere Ubu |
| 12/18/1976 | The Crypt, Akron, OH | Opening for Pere Ubu |
| 1976 | Bombay Bicycle Club, Akron, OH | Opening for King Cobra |
| 12/31/1976 | The Crypt, Akron, OH | Opening for King Cobra |
1977
| 01/01/1977 | The Crypt, Akron, OH | Opening for King Cobra |
| 01/13/1977 | The Crypt, Akron, OH | Opening for Pere Ubu |
| 01/14/1977 | The Crypt, Akron, OH | Opening for Pere Ubu |
| 01/20/1977 | Pirate's Cove, Cleveland, OH | Opening for Pere Ubu |
| 01/21/1977 | The Crypt, Akron, OH | Rubber City Rebels opened |
| 01/22/1977 | The Crypt, Akron, OH | Rubber City Rebels opened |
| 01/26/1977 | The Crypt, Akron, OH | Rubber City Rebels opened |
| 01/27/1977 | Pirate's Cove, Cleveland, OH | Opening for Pere Ubu |
| 02/11/1977 | The Crypt, Akron, OH | Rubber City Rebels opened |
| 02/12/1977 | The Crypt, Akron, OH | Rubber City Rebels opened |
'Mongoloid' release
| 03/12/1977 | Akron Art Institute, Akron, OH | Free show, premiere of 'The Truth About De-Evolution' |
| 03/15/1977 | J.B.'s, Kent, OH | 15-60-75 opened. |
| 03/18/1977 | The Crypt, Akron, OH | |
| 03/19/1977 | The Crypt, Akron, OH | |
| 03/24/1977 | Pirate's Cove, Cleveland, OH | Opening for Pere Ubu |
| 03/25/1977 | The Crypt, Akron, OH | Two shows on this date |
| 03/31/1977 | Pirate's Cove, Cleveland, OH | Opening for Pere Ubu |
| 04/14/1977 | Pirate's Cove, Cleveland, OH | Opening for The Bizarros |
| 04/16/1977 | Eagle Street Saloon, Cleveland, OH | |
| 04/21/1977 | Pirate's Cove, Cleveland, OH | Opening for Pere Ubu |
| 04/28/1977 | Pirate's Cove, Cleveland, OH | Opening for Pere Ubu |
| 04/1977 | Minneapolis, MN | Exact date or venue unknown. Devo's first show outside of Ohio. |
| 05/05/1977 | Pirate's Cove, Cleveland, OH | Orb opened. |
| 05/07/1977 | Eagle Street Saloon, Cleveland, OH | |
| 05/14/1977 | Eagle Street Saloon, Cleveland, OH | |
| 05/??/1977 | Johnson Hall, Kent State University, Kent, OH | |
| 05/19/1977 | Pirate's Cove, Cleveland, OH | Opening for Pere Ubu |
| 05/23/1977 | CBGB, New York, NY | |
| 05/24/1977 | CBGB, New York, NY | |
| 05/25/1977 | Max's Kansas City, New York, NY | Fox & Co opened. |
| 05/26/1977 | Pirate's Cove, Cleveland, OH | Opening for The Nerves. |
| 05/27/1977 | Baker University Center Ballroom, Ohio University, Athens, OH | Don Young's Production Opened. |
| 05/28/1977 | Eagle Street Saloon, Cleveland, OH | Live recording of show released as 'Miracle Witness Hour' |
| 06/??/1977 | J.B.'s, Kent, OH | Exact date unknown |
| 06/19/1977 | Hideo's Discodrome, Cleveland Heights, OH | |
| 07/06/1977 | Hot Club, Philadelphia, PA | |
| 07/07/1977 | Max's Kansas City, New York, NY | The Cramps opened. |
| 07/08/1977 | Max's Kansas City, New York, NY | The Cramps opened. |
| 07/09/1977 | Max's Kansas City, New York, NY | The Cramps opened. |
| 07/14/1977 | Pirate's Cove, Cleveland, OH | Dead Boys opened. |
| 07/25/1977 | Starwood, West Hollywood, CA | Opening for Clown. Devo had re-located to California by this point. |
| 07/26/1977 | Starwood, West Hollywood, CA | Opening for Clown. Devo had re-located to California by this point. |
| 08/02/1977 | Mabuhay Gardens, San Francisco, CA | The Dix opened. |
| 08/03/1977 | Mabuhay Gardens, San Francisco, CA | The Dix opened. |
| 08/12/1977 | Myron's Ballroom, Los Angeles, CA | The Dills opened. |
| 08/20/1977 | Vanguard Gallery, Los Angeles, CA | |
| 08/22/1977 | Starwood, West Hollywood, CA | The Pits opened. |
| 08/23/1977 | Starwood, West Hollywood, CA | The Pits opened. |
| 08/24/1977 | Starwood, West Hollywood, CA | The Pits opened. |

== Other versions ==
For Devo's debut album Q: Are We Not Men? A: We Are Devo!, "Mongoloid" was re-recorded. This version contains much more involved synthesizer playing throughout the song rather than during the opening and closing. An "E-Z Listening" version of "Mongoloid" was made for playing before concerts and appears on the 1987 E-Z Listening Disc. In 2002, Devo performed a techno version of "Mongoloid" at a special show for the writers and producers of the cartoon Rugrats (for which Mark Mothersbaugh composed the theme song). In 2007, Gerald Casale played an acoustic version of "Mongoloid" accompanied on the piano by Re/Search co-founder V. Vale at a re-release party for Industrial Culture Handbook. The video is available on the Re/Search Publications website.

=== Covers ===
"Mongoloid" has been one of the most frequently covered songs in the Devo catalog:

- A 1979 Rhino Records compilation of Devo covers by various local bands, titled KROQ-FM Devotees Album, features three humorous versions of this song recorded by Jupiter, the Deadliners, and the Sordes.
- Lost Kids, a Danish punk band, covered the track in the song Asocial with different lyrics, released on the 1978 EP Født Som Nul and the 1979 compilation Pære punk.
- A bluegrass version, recorded in Cleveland, Ohio, by the Hotfoot Quartet in 1980 and released as a 45 rpm single on the Black Snake label.
- Australian rock band Custard covers of the song on their 1996 EP Lucky Star.
- Brazilian heavy metal band Sepultura included the song on their 2003 album Revolusongs, a limited release EP of cover songs.
- The Washington Dead Cats, a French punkabilly band, covered "Mongoloid" on their album "El Diablo is Back" in 2006.
- "Loose n Boozy" Vancouver BC band The Cadaver Dogs, referred to as "the Blue Cheer of country" included a bonus hidden track cover of "Mongoloid " on their 2008 release PARIAH SOCIAL. The tune came out of a late night drunken Crazy Horse type jam...ragged, but right!
