= Freedom of Choice (song) =

Single by Devo

from the album Freedom of Choice
- B-side: "Snowball"
- Released: December 29, 1980
- Studio: Record Plant (Hollywood)
- Genre: Punk rock; post-punk
- Length: 3:28
- Label: Warner Bros.
- Songwriters: Mark Mothersbaugh; Gerald Casale
- Producers: Devo; Robert Margouleff

Devo singles chronology
"Gates of Steel" (1980)	"Freedom of Choice" (1980)	"Through Being Cool" (1981)

Music video
- "Freedom of Choice" on YouTube

"Freedom of Choice" is a song by the American new wave band Devo, written by Mark Mothersbaugh and Gerald Casale. It appears on the studio album of the same name.

The song was inspired by a Carl's Jr. ad touting freedom of choice but showing four nearly identical hamburgers. In the 2024 documentary Devo, Casale explains that "because Carl's Jr. were a staunch fundamentalist, right-wing, anti-choice organization...that juxtaposition is surreal." In the same film, Bob Mothersbaugh explains further: "The whole idea of 'Freedom of Choice' is like you don't want freedom of choice. You wanna be told what to do. Freedom from choice is what you want."

The line, "In ancient Rome, there was a poem about a dog who found two bones. He picked at one, he licked the other, he went in circles 'till he dropped dead", resembles the Buridan's ass paradox about the nature of free will, with a dog changed for the donkey who dies when he can't decide which bone to eat. Ultimate Classic Rock critic Dave Swanson refers to this line as "a sarcastic view of the main subject".

Record World said that the song had "a pounding rhythm with fight-song choruses." Swanson rated "Freedom of Choice" as Devo's 10th best song, particularly praising its riff.

The single itself has no defined A or B side and instead instructs buyers to "Use your Freedom of Choice" in deciding which song is on which side. The cover and label include two empty checkboxes on either side which allow either "Freedom of Choice" or "Snowball" to be the A or B side.

== Promotional music video ==
In the music video to "Freedom of Choice", the band appeared as aliens. This video also featured professional skateboarders of the day.

== Chart performance ==
Chart (1980)	Position
US Billboard Bubbling Under the Hot 100	103
US Hot Dance Club Songs	8
Australia ARIA Top 100	71
