= Secret Agent Man (Johnny Rivers song) =

Song written by P. F. Sloan and Steve Barri

Single by Johnny Rivers

from the album ...And I Know You Wanna Dance
- B-side: "You Dig"
- Released: March 1966
- Venue: Whisky a Go Go, Los Angeles, California
- Genre: Rock; novelty
- Length: 2:58
- Label: Imperial 66159
- Songwriters: P. F. Sloan, Steve Barri
- Producer: Lou Adler

Johnny Rivers singles chronology
"Under Your Spell Again" (1965)	"Secret Agent Man" (1966)	"(I Washed My Hands in) Muddy Water" (1966)

"Secret Agent Man" is a song written by P. F. Sloan and Steve Barri. The most famous recording of the song was made by Johnny Rivers for the opening titles of the American broadcast of the British spy series Danger Man, which aired in the U.S. as Secret Agent from 1964 to 1966. Rivers's version peaked at #3 on the Billboard Hot 100 and #4 on the Canadian RPM chart, one of the biggest hits of his career. Numerous covers and adaptations have been recorded since then with the song becoming both a rock standard and one of Johnny Rivers's signature songs.

== History ==
According to composer P. F. Sloan, the American television network that licensed Danger Man, CBS, solicited publishers to contribute a 15-second piece of music for the opening of the U.S. show to replace the small section of the British theme, an instrumental by Edwin Astley entitled "High Wire", which started each episode. CBS executives were worried the show might not be successful without a "hummable" theme song. Sloan wrote the song's opening guitar lick, which echoes John Barry's "James Bond Theme", and the first few lines of the song, with his songwriting partner Steve Barri contributing to the chorus. This fragment was recorded as a demo by Sloan and Barri, submitted to CBS, and picked as the show's theme, which led to Sloan and Barri writing a full-length version of the song. The original demo of the song used the "Danger Man" title, as shown by a demo of the song sung by Sloan. When the show's American title was changed, the lyrics were changed to match. The full version of "High Wire", which plays over the episode credits following the "Secret Agent" titles, was retained.

In 1965, surf rock band The Challengers recorded a version for their album The Man From U.N.C.L.E. featuring vocal harmonies, horns, and vibraphone. This would be the first commercial release of the song, though it was never released as a single and consequently did not garner much attention.

Sloan and Barri's publisher/producer, Lou Adler, also produced and managed Johnny Rivers, so Rivers was chosen to add the vocals for the TV show. Rivers claimed to have written the guitar intro, although it is clearly heard on Sloan's demo version. Chuck Day, the father of Cass Elliot's daughter, also claims to have written the riff.

Rivers's original recording was merely the show theme, with one verse and one chorus. Later, after the song gained in popularity, Rivers recorded it live, with two new verses and the chorus repeated twice more. The live version was recorded in 1966 at the Whisky a Go Go and released with studio overdubs supervised by Adler. (Edit) According to drummer Mickey Jones' autobiography "That Would Be Me: Rock & Roll Survivor To Hollywood Actor" the song was not recorded at The Whiskey a Go Go, but in a studio. Jones says Lou Adler brought some people into a room and gave them beer and sandwiches and recorded their ambient noise to add to the studio recording to make it sound like it was live.

The lyric "they've given you a number and taken away your name" refers to the numerical code names given to secret agents, as in "007" for James Bond, although it also unintentionally foreshadows Danger Man star Patrick McGoohan's subsequent series The Prisoner, in which the main character is known only as "Number Six".

== Chart ==
Chart (1966)	Peak position
Australia (Kent Music Report)	78
Canada (RPM)	4
Sweden (Kvällstoppen)	19
Sweden (Tio i Topp)	15
US Billboard Hot 100	3
US Cash Box Top 100	4
US Record World 100 Top Pops	3

== Personnel ==
=== Musicians ===
- Johnny Rivers – vocals, electric guitar
- Chuck Day – bass guitar, guitar
- Mickey Jones – drums
- Larry Knechtel – organ
- Joe Osborn – bass guitar, guitar

=== Technical ===
- Lou Adler – producer
- Bones Howe – engineer

== The Ventures version ==
"Secret Agent Man"

Single by The Ventures

from the album Play the Batman Theme
- B-side: "007-11"
- Released: 1966
- Genre: Surf rock, instrumental rock, rock and roll
- Label: Dolton Records
- Songwriters: P. F. Sloan; Steve Barri
- Producer: Joe Saraceno

The Ventures singles chronology
"Sleigh Ride" (1965)	"Secret Agent Man" (1966)	"Blue Star" (1966)

Instrumental rock band the Ventures did an instrumental version for their 1966 album, Play the Batman Theme, which featured several instrumental covers of television themes. Released as the band's first single of 1966, it reached #54 in the US and #82 in Canada, and was on the charts concurrently with the Rivers version.

== Devo version ==
"Secret Agent Man"

Single by Devo

from the album Duty Now for the Future
- B-side: "Soo Bawlz", "Red Eye"
- Released: 1979
- Genre: New wave; hard rock
- Length: 3:37
- Label: Warner Bros.
- Songwriters: P. F. Sloan; Steve Barri; Mark Mothersbaugh
- Producer: Ken Scott

Devo singles chronology
"The Day My Baby Gave Me a Surprize" (1979)	"Secret Agent Man" (1979)	"Girl U Want" (1980)

New wave band Devo recorded a version of "Secret Agent Man" in 1974, which was featured in their 1976 short film The Truth About De-Evolution. They re-recorded the song in 1979 for their second studio album, Duty Now for the Future, with a heavily modified arrangement and significantly altered lyrics sung by guitarist Bob Mothersbaugh.

== Bruce Willis version ==
"Secret Agent Man / James Bond is Back"

Single by Bruce Willis

from the album The Return of Bruno
- B-side: "Lose Myself", "Under the Boardwalk"
- Released: September 1987
- Genre: Rock and roll, R&B, pop
- Length: 4:48
- Label: Motown
- Songwriters: P. F. Sloan; Steve Barri
- Producer: Robert Kraft

Bruce Willis recorded a version for his 1987 album The Return of Bruno which rose to #43 on the UK charts. Willis' version features introductory stock sounds and a new subtitle, "James Bond Is Back".

== Other covers and adaptations ==
- Mel Tormé recorded a cover in 1966, the same year Rivers released the song, which appears on his album Right Now!
- Quebecois band Les Classels recorded a French-language version entitled "Agent de liaison" in 1966. It appears on their album Et Maintenant... of the same year.
- Finnish singer Danny recorded a Finnish-language version entitled "Vaaksa vaaraa vain," also in 1966, which appears on his record Se olla voi toisinkin päin of the same year.
- Jazz legend Art Blakey did an instrumental soul jazz take on "Secret Agent Man" for his 1967 album Hold On, I'm Coming.
- In 1978, Detroit-area punk-styled band Cinecyde recorded a version for their Black Vinyl Threat EP on Tremor Records, a recording later collected on their CD You Live a Lie You're Gonna Die.
- In 1983, Showbiz Pizza Place band The Rock-afire Explosion covered the song on their “Christmas 1983” show tape. The third verse is removed in favor of a spoken word section where the character Earl Schmerle tells a story of dealing with the kidnapper “Diamond Rolfe”. It also mentions wearing a “bulletproof colander”, a reference to Showbiz’s Crazy Colander promotion.
- A Spanish version, "Hombre Secreto", recorded by The Plugz, is on the soundtrack to the film Repo Man (1984).
- Surf punk pioneers Agent Orange recorded a version for their 1984 When You Least Expect It EP. They released "Secret Agent Man" again in 1986 as a double A-side with "Shakin All Over."
- Blotto recorded a live version of the song in the mid-1980s, which was eventually released on their Then More Than Ever compilation album in 1999.
- Japanese band RC Succession released a Japanese version of the song on their 1988 Covers album.
- Punk rockers The Pagans recorded at least three live versions over the years, which appear on their live albums Pirate's Cove 9/24/79 and Live Road Kill as well as on the B-side of the "Dead End America" 7".
- Hank Williams Jr. included a version originally recorded for his album Montana Cafe on the 1992 compilation The Bocephus Box.
- Finnish singer Tony Montana did his own version of "Vaaksa vaaraa vain" for his 1994 album Vaaksa vaaraa.
- Blues Traveler recorded a version of the song for the soundtrack of the 1995 film Ace Ventura: When Nature Calls.
- Vicious Delite included a cover on their self-titled and only record in 1995.
- The song was also recorded by The Toasters and included on the band's 1996 album Hard Band for Dead.
- In 1996, Munch's Make Believe Band covered the song on their Awesome Adventure Machine show tape.
- The Dickies recorded a version for the 1997 album Show and Tell: A Stormy Remembrance of TV Theme Songs, a compilation of TV theme covers by various pop-punk artists.
- The band Psychotic Aztecs, composed of former members of The Plugz and Oingo Boingo, recorded a Spanish version as "Agente Secreto" on their 1998 album Santa Sangre.
- Japanese band Polysics did a version for their 1999 Plus Chicker EP.
- In 2000, a Japanese-language version was used as the theme-song for a TV drama called Heisei Meoto Jawan Dokechi no Hanamichi (Japanese:平成夫婦茶碗〜ドケチの花道〜). A one-off group called "Secret Agent", which included Noriyuki Higashiyama, Ryo Nishikido and others, was put together by Johnny's Juniors talent agency to record the song.
- Da Vinci's Notebook recorded a parody titled "Secret Asian Man" on their 2000 album The Life and Times of Mike Fanning.
- Brazilian band LP & Os Compactos recorded a cover version on their 2003 debut album Os Brutos Também Amam.
- Heavy metal band Cirith Ungol included the song on their 2001 rare tracks compilation, Servants of Chaos.
- The Swedish rockabilly band The Go Getters recorded a cover of the song 2008 album "Hot Rod Roadeo".
- The song has been recorded by Rachael MacFarlane on her 2012 debut album, Hayley Sings.
- American jam band Goose performs live covers of the song beginning in 2018.

== See also ==
- Secret Asian Man
