= The Truth About De-Evolution =

1976 short film directed by Chuck Statler

The Truth About De-Evolution (full title: In the Beginning Was the End: The Truth About De-Evolution) is a 9-minute short film written by Gerald Casale and Mark Mothersbaugh (members of the New Wave band Devo), and directed by Chuck Statler. The film contained two songs: "Secret Agent Man" and "Jocko Homo". It won at the Ann Arbor Film Festival in 1977 and was routinely screened before Devo live concerts. The Truth About De-Evolution is included as an extra on the Criterion Collection's release of Island of Lost Souls (1932). Stills from the film were used for the front and back cover of European releases and the inner sleeve of American releases of Q: Are We Not Men? A: We Are Devo! (1978).

== Synopsis ==
The film begins with an extreme close-up of a television, switching between channels while odd gibberish noises play in the background. The film title is superimposed over the television screen. The scene then fades to a shot of a factory. Members of Devo are seen in blue workmen's suits, operating machinery, until one notices it is time to go. All the band members wear clear face masks, except for Mark Mothersbaugh, who appears in his Booji Boy mask. The members leave work and get into a car. They pull up in front of the burned-out Kent bar The Water Street Saloon (two buildings down from JB's in Kent, Ohio). The next clip shows them going in JB's through the front door, carrying instruments. A sign on the door says "Tonight: 15-60-75", a reference to the Numbers Band (for which at one point Gerald Casale played bass). The "Secret Agent Man" performance begins, featuring Bob Mothersbaugh on guitar, Gerald Casale on bass, Jim Mothersbaugh on electric bongos, and Mark Mothersbaugh/Booji Boy on synthesizers. The performance routinely cuts away to bizarre visuals like two men in monkey masks spanking a woman with ping-pong paddles, or a punk playing a double-neck guitar plugged into a space heater. The segment ends with a fadeout of Mark in a John F. Kennedy mask with a painted on bullet wound.

The "Jocko Homo" segment begins with Booji Boy running through a parking lot off of Front Street in Cuyahoga Falls, Ohio. He enters a building through the fire escape to meet with General Boy. They exchange papers and General Boy says, "In the past this information has been suppressed, but now it can be told. Every man, woman, and mutant on this planet shall know the truth about de-evolution." Booji replies, "Oh, dad, we're all Devo!"

A series of rapid-fire cuts of the letters in "DEVO" appears (with the music of "Mechanical Man" also on Hardcore Devo: Volume One) where it cuts to Mark within a classroom, giving a lecture. While Mark delivers the lyrics to "Jocko Homo" (a demo that also appeared on Hardcore Devo: Volume One), the classroom enters a frenzy of excitement, ending in a near riot. As the film ends, Booji Boy is stabbed and his mask is removed. The credits play in a style similar to the title with an extremely distorted cover of "Because" by the Beatles playing. As the film ends the word "DEVO" in neon is shown flashing off.

== Production ==
In order to finance the film, Mark and Casale had set up a graphic design company called "Unit Services", where they had been able to generate $3000. The pair meanwhile had also written the film between late 1975, until mid 1976. The film was shot in May of 1976 around several places within Ohio, including the Goodyear World of Rubber (for the introductory factory scene), the basement stage at the bar JB's (for the "Secret Agent Man" section), a "President's Room" within a local McDonald's (for the General Boy scene), and the Governance Chambers in Kent State University (for the "Jocko Homo" segment (where Devo had held their second concert in 1974)).

== In popular culture ==
The Truth About De-Evolution was in a collection of film shorts which toured the U.S. On the west coast, Slash, a magazine and Search & Destroy reprinted photos they took off theater screens. Television stations were provided copies for broadcast as publicity. Devo sent videotapes to Saturday Night Live on NBC after Truth About De-Evolution, until Elliott Roberts, who had recently become their manager also managed Neil Young, arranged a performance on the show and a broadcast of a clip from The Truth About De-Evolution. A brief sample from the "Jocko Homo" segment was used by Justice, a French electronic duo for the song "Stress" on their debut album Cross.
