= Jocko Homo =

1977 single by Devo

- 1977 Booji Boy Records release of "Mongoloid"/"Jocko Homo"

Single by Devo

from the album Q: Are We Not Men? A: We Are Devo!
- B-side: "Mongoloid"
- Released: February 1978
- Recorded: February 1977
- Genre: New wave; avant-rock
- Length: 2:54 (The Truth About De-Evolution version); 3:19 (single version); 3:41 (album version)
- Label: Booji Boy; Stiff (1977 45 version); Warner Bros. (1978 LP version)
- Songwriter: Mark Mothersbaugh
- Producers: Devo (Booji Boy/Stiff version); Brian Eno (WB version)

Devo singles chronology
"(I Can't Get No) Satisfaction" (1977)	"Jocko Homo" (1978)	"Be Stiff" (1978)

Official audio
- "Jocko Homo" on YouTube

"Jocko Homo" is a song by American new wave band Devo, released on March 12, 1977, by Devo's own label, Booji Boy Records, as the B-side to Devo's first single, "Mongoloid", and later released in the UK on Stiff Records. The song was re-recorded as the feature song for Devo's debut studio album, Q: Are We Not Men? A: We Are Devo! by Warner Bros. Records on August 28, 1978. The original version peaked at No. 62 on the UK singles chart.

The title was derived from a 1924 anti-evolution tract called Jocko-Homo Heavenbound by Bertram Henry Shadduck, while its "Are we not men?"/"We are Devo!" call and response chant is a reference to the pre-Code science fiction horror film Island of Lost Souls (1932). The song had been in Devo's live set lists for several years prior to being recorded, and an early version was featured in the band's 9-minute short film The Truth About De-Evolution (1976).

== Background ==
According to the liner notes of Hardcore Devo: Volume One (2013), "Jocko Homo" was first demoed in 1974, as one of Mark Mothersbaugh's first solo compositions for the band. The earliest known live performance of the song was on Halloween night of 1975, opening for jazz composer Sun Ra. The released recording of this version is seven minutes long. However, according to a 1997 interview with Mark Mothersbaugh, they performed a half-hour rendition of the song as a joke to annoy the crowd: "We'd play 'Jocko Homo' for 30 minutes, and we wouldn't stop until people were actually fighting with us, trying to make us stop playing the song. We'd just keep going, 'Are we not men? We are Devo!' for like 25 minutes, directed at people in an aggressive enough manner that even the most peace-lovin' hippie wanted to throw fists."

Between 1975 and 1976, Devo filmed The Truth About De-Evolution, a short experimental film, part of which was set to the 1974 demo of "Jocko Homo".

== Personnel ==
(Booji Boy/Stiff version)

- Mark Mothersbaugh – lead vocals, synthesizers
- Gerald Casale – bass guitar, backing vocals
- Bob Mothersbaugh – electric guitar, backing vocals
- Jim Mothersbaugh – electronic percussion, drums

(WB version)

- Mark Mothersbaugh – lead vocals, synthesizers, organ, clavinet
- Gerald Casale – bass guitar, backing vocals
- Bob Mothersbaugh – lead guitar, backing vocals
- Bob Casale – rhythm guitar, synthesizer, backing vocals
- Alan Myers – drums

== Composition ==
The title is taken from a 1924 anti-evolution tract called Jocko-Homo Heavenbound by Bertram Henry Shadduck, where the term is defined as "ape-man".

The song's verses primarily concern themselves with the view of de-evolution, noting foibles in human society. Most versions include a bridge that begins with "God made man, but he used the monkey to do it." This is a response and reference to the Uncle Dave Macon song "The Bible's True" (1926), an anti-evolution song.

The song also contains several call and response choruses, including the repeated chant "Are we not men?/We are Devo!" Co-writer Mark Mothersbaugh has stated that the line is a reference to the 1932 film Island of Lost Souls, an adaptation of the 1896 H. G. Wells science fiction horror novel The Island of Doctor Moreau, from which the line actually originated. Mothersbaugh says of the film: "There were like, watered down, wussy versions of it in the later Islands of Dr. Moreau stuff, but that was a really intense movie."

"Jocko Homo", in its variations, has also contained other chants between the main verses and the closing chant, including "We accept you/We reject you/One of us! One of us!", a reference to Tod Browning's Freaks (1932), "I've got a rhyme that comes in a riddle/O-Hi-O!/What's round on the ends and high in the middle?/O-Hi-O!", a reference to a 1922 Broadway song by Alfred Bryan and Bert Hanlon, often performed by the Ohio State University marching band, and "White dopes on punk!", a reference to the Tubes' song "White Punks on Dope".

The original version of "Jocko Homo" lacks all call and response choruses except "Are we not men?", as well as the "God made man" bridge. This demo version appears on the Hardcore Devo: Volume One compilation, and the Greatest Misses compilation as well. The Booji Boy Records single version contains both the "O-Hi-O!" and the "God made man" bridge. The version on Q: Are We Not Men? A: We Are Devo! only includes the "God made man" bridge.

The song begins in the unusual time signature of 7/8 time, but switches partway through to common 4/4 time for the call and response sections.

== Music video ==
A music video for the song "Jocko Homo" was part of the short film, The Truth About De-Evolution, Devo's first music video, directed by Chuck Statler. It begins with an interstitial scene of Booji Boy running through a Cuyahoga Falls parking lot, up a fire escape, and into a building. There, he meets with General Boy, who is played by Mark and Bob Mothersbaugh's father (Robert Mothersbaugh, Sr.), and hands him papers. After an announcement from General Boy, there are a series of rapid fire cuts of the letters "D-E-V-O" set to the intro of the Devo song "Mechanical Man", and then the main video begins. In it, Mark Mothersbaugh plays a professor, lecturing to a class of students in surgical masks, caps, and 3-D glasses. As the song progresses, the class begins to riot.

== Other versions ==
Devo recorded a muzak version for their EZ Listening Cassette in 1981, which was reissued on their E-Z Listening Disc compilation in 1987.

On the 1988 and 1990 tours, as well as at the 1996 Park City, Utah show and the 2002 Hollywood, Los Angeles show, Devo performed a drastically re-arranged and slowed down acoustic version of "Jocko Homo", which can be heard on their live album Now It Can Be Told: Devo at the Palace (1989).

Parodist "Weird Al" Yankovic included a portion of this song in his first polka medley, "Polkas on 45", from his second studio album "Weird Al" Yankovic in 3-D (1984).

French indie rock band Sloy recorded a cover version of "Jocko Homo" for their extended play (EP), Electric Session 1 (1997).

== Charts ==
Chart (1978)	Peak position
UK singles chart	62
