= (I Can't Get No) Satisfaction =

1965 single by The Rolling Stones

- US picture sleeve

Single by The Rolling Stones
- B-side: "The Under Assistant West Coast Promotion Man" (US); "The Spider and the Fly" (UK)
- Released: 4 June 1965 (US); 20 August 1965 (UK)
- Recorded: 12 May 1965
- Studio: RCA (Hollywood, California)
- Genre: Rock; hard rock
- Length: 3:45
- Label: London (US); Decca (UK)
- Songwriter: Jagger–Richards
- Producer: Andrew Loog Oldham

The Rolling Stones singles chronology
"The Last Time" (1965)	"(I Can't Get No) Satisfaction" (1965)	"Get Off of My Cloud" (1965)

Lyric video
- "(I Can't Get No) Satisfaction" on YouTube

"(I Can't Get No) Satisfaction" is a song by the English rock band The Rolling Stones. A product of Mick Jagger and Keith Richards' songwriting partnership, it features a guitar riff by Richards that opens and drives the song. The riff is widely considered one of the greatest hooks in rock history. The song's lyrics refer to sexual frustration and commercialism.

The song was first released as a single in the United States in June 1965 and was also featured on the American version of The Rolling Stones' third studio album, Out of Our Heads, released that July. "Satisfaction" was a hit, giving the Stones their first number one in the US. In the UK, the song initially was played only on pirate radio stations, because its lyrics were considered too sexually suggestive. It later became The Rolling Stones' fourth number one in the United Kingdom.

The song was ranked No. 2 on Rolling Stone magazine's 500 Greatest Songs of All Time list in 2004. It was inducted into the Grammy Hall of Fame in 1998 and added to the National Recording Registry of the Library of Congress in 2006.

== Recording ==
Keith Richards wrote "Satisfaction" in his sleep and recorded a rough version of the riff on a Philips cassette player. He had no idea he had written it. He said when he listened to the recording in the morning, there were about two minutes of acoustic guitar before you could hear him drop the pick and "then me snoring for the next forty minutes". Sources vary as to where this story happened. While they make reference to a hotel room at the Fort Harrison Hotel in Clearwater, Florida, a house in Chelsea, and the London Hilton, Richards wrote in his most recent autobiography that he was in his flat in Carlton Hill, St. John's Wood. He specifies that Mick Jagger wrote the lyrics by the pool in Clearwater, four days before they went into the studio, hence the confusion.

The Rolling Stones first recorded the track on 10 May 1965 at Chess Studios in Chicago, Illinois, which included Brian Jones on harmonica. The Stones lip-synched to a dub of this version the first time they debuted the song on the American music variety television programme Shindig! The group re-recorded it two days later at RCA Studios in Hollywood, California, with a different beat and the Maestro fuzzbox adding sustain to the sound of the guitar riff. Richards envisioned redoing the track later with a horn section playing the riff: "this was just a little sketch, because, to my mind, the fuzz tone was really there to denote what the horns would be doing." The other band members (Jones, Watts, and Wyman), as well as producer and manager Andrew Loog Oldham and sound engineer David Hassinger eventually outvoted Richards and Jagger so the track was selected for release as a single. The song's success boosted sales of the Gibson fuzzbox so that the entire available stock sold out by the end of 1965.

Like most of The Rolling Stones' pre-1966 recordings, "(I Can't Get No) Satisfaction" was originally released in mono only. In the mid-1980s, a true stereo version of the song was released on German and Japanese editions of the CD reissue of Hot Rocks 1964–1971. The stereo mix features a piano (played by session player Jack Nitzsche, who also provides the song's iconic tambourine) and acoustic guitar that are barely audible in the original mono release (both instruments are also audible on a bootleg recording of the instrumental track). This stereo mix of "Satisfaction" also appeared on a radio-promo CD of rare stereo tracks provided to US radio stations in the mid-1980s, but has not yet been featured on a worldwide commercial CD; even later pressings of the German and Japanese Hot Rocks CDs feature the mono mix, making the earlier releases with the stereo mix collector's items. For the worldwide 2002 reissue of Hot Rocks, an alternative quasi-stereo mix was used featuring the lead guitar, bass, drums, and vocals in the center channel and the acoustic guitar and piano "split" left and right via a delay effect.

== Lyrics and melody ==
Guitar riff from "(I Can't Get No) Satisfaction"

The song opens with the guitar riff, which is joined by the bass halfway through. It is repeated three times with the drums and acoustic guitar before the vocal enters with the line: "I can't get no satisfaction." The key is E major, but with the 3rd and 7th degree occasionally lowered, creating – in the first part of the verses ("I can't get no ...") – a distinctive mellow sound. The accompanying chords (i.e. E major, D major and A major) are borrowed from the E mixolydian scale, which is often used in blues and rock.

The title line is an example of a negative concord. Jagger sings the verses in a tone hovering between cynical commentary and frustrated protest, and then leaps half singing and half yelling into the chorus, where the guitar riff reappears. The lyrics outline the singer's irritation and confusion with the increasing commercialism of the modern world, where the radio broadcasts "useless information" and a man on television tells him "how white my shirts can be – but he can't be a man 'cause he doesn't smoke the same cigarettes as me", a reference to the then ubiquitous Marlboro Cowboy style advertisement. Jagger also describes the stress of being a celebrity, and the tensions of touring. The reference in the verse to not getting any "girl reaction" was fairly controversial in its day, interpreted by some listeners (and radio programmers) as meaning a girl willing to have sex. Jagger commented that they "didn't understand the dirtiest line", as afterwards the girl asks him to return the following week as she is "on a losing streak", an apparent reference to menstruation. The song closes with a fairly subdued repetition of the song's title, followed suddenly by a full shout of the line, with the final words repeated into the fade-out.

In its day the song was perceived as disturbing because of both its sexual connotations and the negative view of commercialism and other aspects of modern culture; critic Paul Gambaccini stated: "The lyrics to this were truly threatening to an older audience. This song was perceived as an attack on the status quo." When the Rolling Stones performed the song on Shindig! in 1965, the line "trying to make some girl" was censored, although a performance on The Ed Sullivan Show on 13 February 1966 was uncensored. Forty years later, when the band performed three songs during the February 2006 Super Bowl XL halftime show, "Satisfaction" was the only one of the three songs not censored as it was broadcast. The censored songs were "Start Me Up" and "Rough Justice".

== Release and success ==
"Satisfaction" was released as a single in the US by London Records on 4 June 1965, with "The Under-Assistant West Coast Promotion Man" as its B-side. The single entered the Billboard Hot 100 chart in America in the week ending 12 June 1965, remaining there for 14 weeks, reaching the top on 10 July by displacing the Four Tops' "I Can't Help Myself (Sugar Pie Honey Bunch)". "Satisfaction" held the number one spot for four weeks, being knocked off on 7 August by "I'm Henry the Eighth, I Am" by Herman's Hermits. While in its eighth week on the American charts, the single was certified a gold record award by the RIAA for shipping over a million copies across the United States, giving the band their first of many gold disc awards in America. Later the song was also released by London Records on Out of Our Heads in America. Billboard ranked the record as the No. 3 song of 1965. Billboard said of the single that a "hard-driving blues dance beat backs up a strong vocal performance."

"Satisfaction" was not immediately released by Decca Records in Great Britain. Decca was already in the process of preparing a live Rolling Stones EP for release, so the new single did not come out in Britain until 20 August, with "The Spider and the Fly" on the B-side. The song peaked at number one for two weeks, replacing Sonny & Cher's "I Got You Babe", between 11 and 25 September, before being toppled by the Walker Brothers' "Make It Easy on Yourself".

In the decades since its release, "Satisfaction" has repeatedly been acclaimed by the music industry. In 1976, Britain's New Musical Express listed "Satisfaction" 7th among the top 100 singles of all time. There was a resurgence of interest in the song after it was prominently featured in the 1979 movie Apocalypse Now. In 1991, Vox listed "Satisfaction" among "100 records that shook the world". In 1999, BMI named "Satisfaction" as the 91st-most performed song of the 20th century. In 2000, VH1 listed "Satisfaction" first among its "Top 100 Greatest Rock Songs"; the same year, "Satisfaction" also finished runner-up to "Yesterday" in a list jointly compiled by Rolling Stone and MTV. In 2003, Q placed the song 68th out of its "1001 Best Songs Ever". Newsweek magazine has called the opening riff "five notes that shook the world".

The song and its opening riff are widely considered both iconic and one of the greatest musical hooks of all time. "Satisfaction" was ranked number 2 on both Rolling Stone's 500 Greatest Songs of All Time list in 2004, and the magazine's list of the band's best songs. A 2021 update ranked the song number 31. In 1998, the song was inducted into the Grammy Hall of Fame. It was added to the Library of Congress' National Recording Registry list of sound recordings that "are culturally, historically, or aesthetically important" in 2006.

Jagger commented on the song's appeal:

It was the song that really made The Rolling Stones, changed us from just another band into a huge, monster band ... It has a very catchy title. It has a very catchy guitar riff. It has a great guitar sound, which was original at that time. And it captures a spirit of the times, which is very important in those kinds of songs ... Which was alienation.

The song has become a staple at Rolling Stones shows. They have performed it on nearly every tour since its release, and concert renditions have been included on the albums Got Live If You Want It!, Still Life, Flashpoint, Live Licks, Shine a Light, Hyde Park Live, and Havana Moon. One unusual rendition is included in Robert Frank's film Cocksucker Blues from the 1972 tour, when the song was performed by both The Rolling Stones and Stevie Wonder's band as the second half of a medley with Wonder's "Uptight".

== Personnel ==
Credits adapted from a College of Wooster listening guide and the Library of Congress National Recording Registry essay for the song.

=== The Rolling Stones ===
- Mick Jagger – lead vocals, backing vocals
- Keith Richards – fuzz guitar, lead guitar, backing vocals
- Brian Jones – acoustic rhythm guitar
- Bill Wyman – bass guitar
- Charlie Watts – drums

=== Additional personnel ===
- Jack Nitzsche – piano, tambourine

=== Production ===
- Andrew Loog Oldham – producer
- Dave Hassinger – engineer

== Charts ==
=== Weekly charts ===
Chart (1965)	Peak position
Australia	1
Austria (Ö3 Austria Top 40)	1
Belgium (Ultratop 50 Flanders)	6
Canada Top Singles (RPM)	3
Finland (Soumen Virallinen)	1
Germany (GfK)	1
Ireland (IRMA)	1
Netherlands (Single Top 100)	1
New Zealand (Lever Hit Parade)	4
Norway (VG-lista)	1
South Africa (Springbok Radio)	1
Rhodesia (Lyons Maid)	2
Spanish Singles Chart	5
Sweden (Kvällstoppen)	1
Sweden (Tio i Topp)	1
UK (Melody Maker)	1
UK (NME)	1
UK Singles (Official Charts)	1
US Billboard Hot 100	1
US Cash Box Top Singles	1
US Record World 100 Top Pops	1

Chart (1970)	Peak position
Netherlands (Single Top 100)	16
Chart (1976)	Peak position
Netherlands (Single Top 100)	25
Chart (1990)	Peak position
Netherlands (Single Top 100)	13
Chart (2015)	Peak position
France (SNEP)	168

=== Year-end charts ===
Chart (1965)	Position
South Africa	17
UK	4
US Billboard Hot 100	3
US KHJ Boss Radio 93 records of 1965	1

== Certifications ==
Certifications and sales for "(I Can't Get No) Satisfaction"
Region	Certification	Certified units/sales
Australia (ARIA)	3× Platinum	210,000^{‡}
Brazil (Pro-Música Brasil)	Gold	30,000^{‡}
Denmark (IFPI Danmark)	Gold	45,000^{‡}
Germany (BVMI)	Gold	500,000^{^}
Germany (BVMI) reissue	Gold	250,000^{‡}
Italy (FIMI)	Platinum	50,000^{‡}
New Zealand (RMNZ)	2× Platinum	60,000^{‡}
Spain (Promusicae)	Platinum	60,000^{‡}
United Kingdom (BPI)	Platinum	600,000^{‡}
United States (RIAA)	Gold	1,000,000^{^}
^{^} Shipments figures based on certification alone.^{‡} Sales+streaming figures based on certification alone.

== Other versions ==
=== Otis Redding ===
Otis Redding recorded a rendition of "Satisfaction" for his album Otis Blue/Otis Redding Sings Soul, released in 1965. Redding claimed that he did not know the lyrics of the song. "I use a lot of words different than the Stones' version," he noted. "That's because I made them up." Of that session, Steve Cropper said, "...if you ever listened to the record you can hardly understand the lyrics, right? I set down to a record player and copied down what I thought the lyrics were and I handed Otis a piece of paper and before we got through with the cut, he threw the paper on the floor and that was it." Music writer Robert Christgau described it as an "anarchic reading" of the Stones' original. Redding's soul-style arrangement featured horns playing the main riff, as Keith Richards had originally intended. In 2003, Ronnie Wood noted that The Rolling Stones' later concert renditions of the number reflect Redding's interpretation. Redding performed the song in June 1967 at the Monterey International Pop Festival.

=== Bubblerock / Jonathan King ===
English singer-songwriter Jonathan King released his version in 1974 under the name Bubblerock, reaching No. 29 on the UK Singles Chart.

=== The Residents ===
The American avant-garde/experimental collective the Residents recorded and released their own performance of "Satisfaction" as a single in 1976. Originally released in an edition of only 200 copies, the cover quickly became a cult sensation, thanks in part to the success of Devo's cover the following year, necessitating a re-press in 1978 of 30,000 copies. Brad Laner, writing for Dangerous Minds, stated the cover "is nearly everything the better known version by Devo from a year later is not: Loose, belligerent, violent, truly fucked-up. A real stick in the eye of everything conventionally tasteful in 1976 America." The single has also been described as a forerunner to noise rock.

=== Devo ===
"(I Can't Get No) Satisfaction"

Single by Devo

from the album B Stiff and Q: Are We Not Men? A: We Are Devo!
- B-side: "Sloppy (I Saw My Baby Gettin')"
- Released: September 1977
- Recorded: July 1977
- Genre: New wave; post-punk; reggae rock
- Length: 2:40
- Label: Booji Boy; Warner Bros.
- Songwriter: Jagger/Richards
- Producers: Brian Eno; Chuck Statler

Devo singles chronology
"Mongoloid" (1977)	"(I Can't Get No) Satisfaction" (1977)	"Jocko Homo" (1978)

American new wave band Devo released their rendition of "(I Can't Get No) Satisfaction" as a single in 1977, initially in a self-produced version on their own label Booji Boy Records. The song was re-recorded with Brian Eno as producer for their first album, and that version was also released as a single in 1978, this time by Warner Brothers Records, after it was played for Mick Jagger's approval. The band filmed a video for the song that would later feature regularly on MTV, while a performance on SNL gave them a national profile. Decades after its release, Steve Huey of AllMusic would write that the cover version "reworks the original's alienation into a spastic freak-out that's nearly unrecognizable". This version of the song was featured prominently in the 1995 Martin Scorsese epic crime film Casino. Devo's version also featured in Netflix's series Sex Education.

Devo's version arose from the group's jam sessions, starting with a guitar part from Bob Casale, joined by a drum beat by Alan Myers and a bass part by Gerald Casale. At first, the band tried the lyrics to "Paint it Black", switching to "Satisfaction" when it did not fit the music.

The quirky music video for the song and several others from this album received significant airplay on the upstart MTV. A notable feature of the video was dancer Craig Allen Rothwell, known as Spazz Attack, whose signature dance move, a forward flip onto his back, drew him significant attention.

Chart (1978)	Peak position
Australia (Kent Music Report)	98
UK Singles Chart	41

=== Britney Spears ===
"(I Can't Get No) Satisfaction"

Song by Britney Spears

from the album Oops!... I Did It Again
- Released: May 3, 2000
- Studio: Pacifique (Los Angeles)
- Genre: Pop
- Length: 4:23
- Label: Jive

Audio
- "[I Can't Get No] Satisfaction" on YouTube

American singer Britney Spears recorded the song with producer Rodney "Darkchild" Jerkins for her second studio album, Oops!... I Did It Again, on 24–26 February 2000 at Pacifique Recording Studios in Hollywood. The song was remixed into a dance-pop and R&B style.

Spears' version received mixed reviews from critics. While reviewing Oops!, Stephen Thomas Erlewine of AllMusic selected the song as Track Pick, describing "the clenched-funk revision of the Stones' deathless 'Satisfaction'" as emblematic of a "bewildering magpie aesthetic" on Spears' early albums. Robert Christgau declared the song a 'choice cut,' meaning a good song on an otherwise lackluster album," while New Musical Express gave the cover a negative review, saying, "the long-awaited [...] [Spears'] cover of the Stones' '(I Can't Get No) Satisfaction' is a letdown".

Spears first performed the song on her 2000's Oops!... I Did It Again Tour. The performance ended with a dance sequence set to the familiar Richards guitar lick that was omitted from her recorded version (played here by her guitarist "Skip"). Spears also performed "(I Can't Get No) Satisfaction" on a medley with her song "Oops!... I Did It Again" at the 2000 MTV Video Music Awards.

=== Other notable versions ===
- Gloria Trevi released a Spanish-language version of the song with female-oriented lyrics, featured on her debut album ...¿Qué hago aquí? (1989).
- Frankie Ruiz recorded a 1999 salsa version that peaked at No. 7 on the Billboard Latin Tropical Airplay chart.
- In 2023, Dolly Parton teamed up with Pink and Brandi Carlile to record a cover of the song. The track was included on Parton's album titled Rockstar released in November.
