= Pioneers Who Got Scalped: The Anthology =

Compilation album by Devo
- Released: 2000
- Recorded: 1976–2000
- Genre: New wave; art punk; punk rock; hardcore punk; synthpop
- Length: 2:34:39
- Label: Rhino
- Producer: Devo; Brian Eno; Ken Scott; Robert Margouleff; Roy Thomas Baker; Bob Casale; Gerald Casale

Devo chronology
| Adventures of the Smart Patrol (1996) | Pioneers Who Got Scalped: The Anthology (2000) | Recombo DNA (2000) |

Professional ratings
Review scores
| Source | Rating |
|---|---|
| AllMusic | 4/5 stars |
| Rolling Stone | 3.5/5 stars |

Pioneers Who Got Scalped: The Anthology is a compilation album by the American new wave band Devo, released in 2000 by Rhino Records. 17 of the 50 tracks were previously unreleased on CD, including single B-sides, outtakes, remixes, soundtrack songs and spoken word material. The band recorded the long-time concert favorite "The Words Get Stuck in My Throat" (from the film The War of the Gargantuas) in the studio for the first time, specifically for inclusion on this compilation.

== Background ==
Pioneers Who Got Scalped came about after Rhino Entertainment was acquired by Warner Bros, giving Rhino access to Devo's old contract with Warners. Devo co-founder Gerald Casale had initially wanted to structure the anthology as a four-disc set, with each disc following a theme: first, the early, pre-Warners years; second, the best of the Warners recordings; third, songs from the band's tenure with Enigma Records, focusing on remixes and unreleased material; and fourth, the band's soundtrack work, called "Devo Goes to the Movies". However, according to Casale, he was told by the label, "that doesn't work for us at retail".

== Title and packaging ==
The title is a reference to the band's opinion that, at the start of their career, they were criticized for originating approaches that soon became common practice.

The packaging, 52-page booklet and 3D cover were conceived by Casale. The original Rhino package used lenticular printing to create "animated" front and back covers. The front cover animation showed tomahawks flying towards the band members who are tied to stakes, causing their energy dome hats to fly off their heads. The back cover shows the animated music executives, who were actual Rhino employees, throwing the tomahawks.

The liner notes are by music historian Andy Zax, most famous for being the "Music Geek" on the Comedy Central program Beat the Geeks.

== Track listing ==
Adapted from the album's liner notes. Asterisks denote songs previously unavailable on CD.

All tracks are written by Mark Mothersbaugh and Gerald Casale, except where otherwise noted.

Disc one
| No. | Title | Writer(s) | Source | Length |
|---|---|---|---|---|
| 1. | "We're All Devo!" (Booji Boy & General Boy) (*) | | From the short film In the Beginning Was the End: The Truth About De-Evolution, 1977 | 1:04 |
| 2. | "Jocko Homo" (Booji Boy Version) (*) | M. Mothersbaugh | B-side of "Mongoloid" (Booji Boy Version), 1977 | 3:18 |
| 3. | "Mongoloid" (Booji Boy Version) | G. Casale | Single A-Side, 1977 | 3:34 |
| 4. | "Be Stiff" (Stiff Version) | G. Casale, Bob Lewis | Single A-side, 1978 | 2:34 |
| 5. | "Uncontrollable Urge" | M. Mothersbaugh | Q: Are We Not Men? A: We Are Devo!, 1978 | 3:10 |
| 6. | "(I Can't Get No) Satisfaction" | Mick Jagger, Keith Richards | Q: Are We Not Men? A: We Are Devo! | 2:40 |
| 7. | "Too Much Paranoias" | M. Mothersbaugh | Q: Are We Not Men? A: We Are Devo! | 1:58 |
| 8. | "Come Back Jonee" | | Single A-side; from Q: Are We Not Men? A: We Are Devo! | 3:48 |
| 9. | "Triumph of the Will" | | Duty Now for the Future, 1979 | 2:16 |
| 10. | "Smart Patrol/Mr. DNA" | | Duty Now for the Future | 6:05 |
| 11. | "Secret Agent Man" | P. F. Sloan, Steve Barri | Single A-side; from Duty Now for the Future | 3:34 |
| 12. | "The Day My Baby Gave Me a Surprize" | M. Mothersbaugh | Single A-side; from Duty Now for the Future | 2:41 |
| 13. | "Soo Bawlz" | M. Mothersbaugh | B-side of "Secret Agent Man", 1979 | 2:21 |
| 14. | "It Takes a Worried Man" (*) | Traditional, arr. Tom Glazer, Donald Guard | From the film Human Highway, 1982; recorded 1979 | 3:28 |
| 15. | "Girl U Want" | | Single A-side; from Freedom of Choice, 1980 | 2:56 |
| 16. | "Freedom of Choice" | | Single A-side; from Freedom of Choice | 3:28 |
| 17. | "Gates of Steel" | G. Casale, M. Mothersbaugh, Sue Schmidt, Debbie Smith | Freedom of Choice | 3:28 |
| 18. | "Whip It" | | Single A-side; from Freedom of Choice | 2:40 |
| 19. | "Snowball" (Single Remix) (*) | | B-side of "Freedom of Choice"; original version from Freedom of Choice | 2:28 |
| 20. | "Mr. B's Ballroom" | M. Mothersbaugh | Freedom of Choice | 2:47 |
| 21. | "Working in the Coal Mine" | Allen Toussaint | Single A-side; bonus 7" included with some copies of New Traditionalists, 1981 | 2:50 |
| 22. | "Love Without Anger" | | New Traditionalists | 2:36 |
| 23. | "Through Being Cool" | G. Casale, M. Mothersbaugh, Bob Mothersbaugh | Single A-side; from New Traditionalists | 3:13 |
| 24. | "Jerkin' Back 'n' Forth" | | New Traditionalists | 3:04 |
| 25. | "Beautiful World" | | Single A-side; from New Traditionalists | 3:34 |
| 26. | "Nu-Tra Speaks (New Traditionalist Man)" (Protar) | G. Casale | B-side of "Beautiful World" picture disc, 1981 | 1:40 |

Disc two
| No. | Title | Writer(s) | Source | Length |
|---|---|---|---|---|
| 1. | "General Boy Visits Apocalypse Now" (General Boy) (*) | | Previously unreleased; recorded 1979 | 1:45 |
| 2. | "Peek-a-Boo!" | | Single A-side; from Oh, No! It's Devo, 1982 | 3:02 |
| 3. | "That's Good" | | Single A-side; from Oh, No! It's Devo | 3:26 |
| 4. | "Big Mess" | | Oh, No! It's Devo | 2:45 |
| 5. | "One Dumb Thing" (*) | | Interstate '82 CD-ROM game, 1999; recorded 1982/1998 | 2:45 |
| 6. | "Theme from Doctor Detroit" (Dance Mix) (*) | | Single A-side; original version from the film Doctor Detroit, 1983 | 6:03 |
| 7. | "Shout" | | Shout | 3:17 |
| 8. | "Here to Go" (Go Mix Version) | | Single A-side; original version from Shout, 1984 | 5:31 |
| 9. | "Are You Experienced?" | Jimi Hendrix | Single A-side; from Shout | 3:09 |
| 10. | "I Wouldn't Do That to You" (*) | | From the film Happy Hour, 1987; recorded 1985 | 3:14 |
| 11. | "Bread and Butter" (*) | Larry Parks, Jay Turnbow | From the film 9½ Weeks, 1986 | 2:31 |
| 12. | "Let's Talk" (*) | M. Mothersbaugh | From the film Fright Night, 1985; recorded 1984 | 2:42 |
| 13. | "Itsy Bitsy Teenie Weenie Yellow Polka Dot Bikini" (*) | Paul Vance, Lee Pockriss | From the film Revenge of the Nerds II: Nerds in Paradise, 1987 | 2:11 |
| 14. | "Baby Doll" (Devo Single Mix) | | Single A-side; original version from Total Devo, 1988 | 3:29 |
| 15. | "Disco Dancer" (7-Inch Version) | | Single A-side; original version from Total Devo | 4:13 |
| 16. | "Some Things Never Change" | | Total Devo | 4:11 |
| 17. | "It Doesn't Matter to Me" (Live 1988) | M. Mothersbaugh | Now It Can Be Told: DEVO at the Palace, 1989 | 2:15 |
| 18. | "Stuck in a Loop" | | Smooth Noodle Maps, 1990 | 3:50 |
| 19. | "Post Post-Modern Man" | | Single A-side; from Smooth Noodle Maps | 2:52 |
| 20. | "Head Like a Hole" | Trent Reznor | From the film Supercop, 1996 | 4:52 |
| 21. | "Thanks to You" | | From the film Meet Wally Sparks, 1997 | 3:19 |
| 22. | "Communication Break-up" (*) | M. Mothersbaugh, Leslie Greif | From the film Meet Wally Sparks | 2:43 |
| 23. | "Duty Now for the Future!" (General Boy) (*) | | From the short film The Men Who Make the Music, 1981; recorded 1979 | 0:30 |
| 24. | "The Words Get Stuck in My Throat" (Booji Boy) (*) | M. Mothersbaugh, Akira Ifukube | New recording, 2000 | 2:49 |

== Personnel ==
All credits adapted from the album's liner notes.

Devo

- Mark Mothersbaugh – vocals, keyboards, guitar, voice (as Booji Boy) on "We're All Devo!" and "The Words Get Stuck in My Throat"
- Gerald Casale – vocals, bass guitar, keyboards
- Bob Mothersbaugh – lead guitar, vocals
- Bob Casale – rhythm guitar, keyboards, vocals
- Jim Mothersbaugh – drums (1974–1976)
- Alan Myers – drums (1976–1986)
- David Kendrick – drums (1986–1990), bongos on "Communication Break-up"
- Josh Freese – drums (1995–)

Additional musicians

- Robert L. Mothersbaugh – voice (as General Boy) on "We're All Devo!", "General Boy Visits Apocalypse Now" and "Duty Now for the Future!"
- Annerose Bücklers – voice (as nurse) on "Theme from Doctor Detroit"
- Roli Rox – additional programming on "Here to Go"
- Steve Lindsay – bass sample on "Disco Dancer"
- Paul C. – additional programming on "Disco Dancer"
- Bob Lee – drums on "Head Like a Hole"
- Nick Vincent – drums on "Thanks to You"
- Ralf Rickert – trumpet on "Communication Break-up"
- Larry Klimas – saxophone on "Communication Break-up"
- Paul Morin – stand-up bass on "Communication Break-up"

Technical

- Devo – producer (disc one: 2, 3, 14–26 / disc 2: 1, 5–16, 18–22, 24), engineer (disc one: 2, 3 / disc 2: 6), compilation producer
- Brian Eno – producer (disc one: 4–8)
- Ken Scott – producer, engineer (disc one: 9–13)
- Robert Margouleff – producer, engineer (disc one: 15–20)
- Roy Thomas Baker – producer (disc two: 2–4)
- Bob Casale – producer (disc two: 17), engineer (disc two: 5, 7–22, 24), mixing (disc two: 20)
- Gerald Casale – producer, engineer (disc two: 17)
- Conny Plank – engineer (disc one: 4–8)
- Patrick Gleeson – engineer (disc one: 8)
- Brian Leshon – assistant engineer (disc one: 9–13)
- Phil Jost – assistant engineer (disc one: 9–13)
- Buck Herring – engineer (disc one: 14)
- Wally Duguid – engineer (disc one: 14)
- Howard Siegal – engineer (disc one: 15–20)
- Karat Faye – assistant engineer (disc one: 15–20, 22, 23, 25)
- Ian Taylor – remix (disc one: 19)
- Michael Boshears – engineer (disc one: 21)
- Larry Alexander – engineer (disc one: 22, 23, 25)
- Phil Brown – engineer (disc one: 24)
- Gordon Fordyce – engineer (disc two: 2–4)
- Stuart Graham – assistant engineer (disc two: 2–4)
- Ed Delena – assistant engineer (disc two: 7–9, 12)
- Mike Shipley – mixing (disc two: 7)
- Ivan Ivan – remix (disc two: 8, 15)
- Steve Peck – remix engineer (disc two: 8)
- Clive Taylor – assistant engineer (disc two: 11)
- Ted Pattison – assistant engineer (disc two: 14–16)
- Roey Shamir – remix engineer (disc two: 15)
- Roger Pauletta – editing (disc two: 15)
- Biff Dawes – live engineer (disc two: 17)
- Andrew Ballard – assistant engineer (disc two: 18, 19)
- Jeff Lord-Alge – mixing (disc two: 18, 19)
- Bill Inglot – remastering, compilation sound producer
- Dan Hersch – remastering
- Gary Peterson – compilation producer
- David McLees – compilation producer
- David Baker – compilation producer
- Josh Mancell – compilation assistance, tape research
- Hugh Brown – art direction, design
- Rachel Gutek – design
