= B Stiff =

B Stiff EP

EP by Devo
- Released: 1978
- Recorded: February 1977–October 1977
- Genre: Art punk; new wave; punk rock
- Length: 17:31
- Label: Stiff
- Producer: Devo; Brian Eno

Devo chronology
B Stiff EP (1978)	Mechanical Man EP (1978)

Singles from Be Stiff EP
- 1. "Mongoloid" Released: March 12, 1977; 2. "(I Can't Get No) Satisfaction" Released: September 1977; 3. "Be Stiff" Released: 1978

Professional ratings
Review scores
Source	Rating
AllMusic	4/5 stars

B Stiff is the first EP by American new wave band Devo, released in 1978 by Stiff Records.

== Background ==
B Stiff is a compilation of three 7-inch singles released by Stiff in the UK, the first two of which had initially been released independently by the band. The EP collects the only three Devo singles released by Stiff. The cover was created by graphic designer Barney Bubbles and photographer Brian Griffin.

== Availability ==
Although the B Stiff EP has never had a proper CD release, five of its six tracks have been re-released on various compilation albums in the digital format:

- "Jocko Homo" – Pioneers Who Got Scalped: The Anthology
- "(I Can't Get Me No) Satisfaction" – Greatest Misses, Hardcore Devo: Volume One
- "Be Stiff" – Greatest Misses, Pioneers Who Got Scalped: The Anthology
- "Mongoloid" – Pioneers Who Got Scalped: The Anthology (A slightly different mix appeared on Hardcore Devo: Volume One.)
- "Sloppy (I Saw My Baby Getting)" – Recombo DNA (The extra few seconds of drum noise and shouting before the song starts have been removed from this version.)

A re-recording of "Social Fools" produced by Brian Eno appeared as the B-side of the "Come Back Jonee" single in 1978. It was later reissued as a bonus track on the Virgin CD release of Q: Are We Not Men A: We Are Devo!/Dev-O Live EP in 1993 and was subsequently reissued again on Social Fools (The Virgin Singles 1978-1982) in 2015 and Turn Around: B-Sides & More (1978-1984) in 2019.

== Track listing ==
Side one

No.	Title	Writer(s)	Length
1.	"Jocko Homo"	Mark Mothersbaugh	3:21
2.	"(I Can't Get Me No) Satisfaction"	Mick Jagger, Keith Richards	2:53
3.	"Be Stiff"	Gerald Casale, Bob Lewis	2:35

Side two

No.	Title	Writer(s)	Length
1.	"Mongoloid"	G. Casale	3:30
2.	"Sloppy (I Saw My Baby Getting)"	M. Mothersbaugh, Bob Mothersbaugh. G. Casale, Gary Jackett	2:20
3.	"Social Fools"	G. Casale, M. Mothersbaugh	2:52
Total length:			17:31

== Personnel ==
Devo

- Bob Casale – rhythm guitar, additional keyboards, occasional backing vocals
- Gerald Casale – bass guitar, additional keyboards, lead vocals
- Bob Mothersbaugh – lead guitar, backing vocals
- Jim Mothersbaugh – electronic drums
- Mark Mothersbaugh – keyboards, occasional guitar, lead vocals
- Alan Myers – drums

Technical

- Devo – producers
- Brian Eno – producer ("Be Stiff")
