= Recombo DNA =

- Cover art by KRK Ryden

Compilation album by Devo
- Released: 2000
- Recorded: 1977–1988
- Genres: New wave; punk rock; synthpop; electronic
- Length: 2:32:36
- Label: Rhino
- Producer: Devo

Devo chronology
Pioneers Who Got Scalped: The Anthology (2000)	Recombo DNA (2000)	Live in Central Park (2004)

Professional ratings
Review scores
Source	Rating
AllMusic	4/5 stars

Recombo DNA is a collection of studio demos and unreleased tracks by the American new wave band Devo. It was originally released in 2000 by Rhino Entertainment's Rhino Handmade label and limited to 5,000 copies.

== Background ==
Recombo DNA is culled from cassettes, reel-to-reel tapes, multi-tracks and DATs from the Devo archives, with an emphasis on recordings that had not previously been illicitly circulated, augmented with some sonically upgraded versions of tracks that had previously leaked. The recordings span the era following the band's first independently released singles to the year prior to their signing with Enigma Records.

On August 11, 2017, Futurismo Records reissued Recombo DNA on quadruple vinyl with additional material and new artwork. For this LP edition, "Somewhere With Devo" was removed from the main track listing, retitled "The Somewhere Suite" and included on a 3-inch Mini CD, a release which had been originally planned for May 1989.

"The Somewhere Suite" is in six parts, and an original advertisement from 1989, reproduced inside the LP reissue, labels them as follows:

- Part 1 DEPARTURE: Search for Somewhere / Somewhere (Prelude) / Somewhere
- Part 2 RECRUITMENT: First Stop the Orient (Society's Fools) / Second Stop Africa (Something Else) / Third Stop Europa (Are You Ready?)
- Part 3 BATTLE FOR THE MIND ITSELF
- Part 4 VICTORY PARADE
- Part 5 FINALE: Somewhere (Refrain) / Shot Into Space...
- Part 6 I'M A DISCO DANCER WITH NOWHERE TO GO

== Track listing ==
Notes adapted from liner notes of original 2000 Rhino Handmade edition.

=== 2000 Rhino Handmade CD edition ===
All tracks are written by Mark Mothersbaugh and Gerald V. Casale, unless otherwise noted.

Sequence A (Disc one)
No.	Title	Writer(s)	Notes	Length
1.	"Recombo DNA (Demo)"	M. Mothersbaugh	4-track demo recorded summer 1977	2:06
2.	"The Words Get Stuck in My Throat (Live)"	M. Mothersbaugh	Live in Minneapolis, 1978, with vocal by Booji Boy; a studio version was recorded for Pioneers Who Got Scalped: The Anthology	5:28
3.	"Sloppy (I Saw My Baby Gettin') (Demo)"	M. Mothersbaugh, Bob Mothersbaugh, Casale, Gary Jackett	Basement 4-track demo from Hardcore Devo sessions	2:17
4.	"Be Stiff (Alternate Mix)"	Casale, Bob Lewis	Basement 4-track demo from Hardcore Devo sessions	2:43
5.	"Pink Pussycat (Demo)"	M. Mothersbaugh, B. Mothersbaugh	Duty Now for the Future album demo; recorded c. late 1978/early 1979	4:08
6.	"Goo Goo Itch (Alternate Version)"	M. Mothersbaugh	Duty Now for the Future album demo; music recorded 1976, vocals re-recorded c. late 1978/early 1979	2:25
7.	"Strange Pursuit (Demo)"		Duty Now for the Future album demo; recorded c. late 1978/early 1979	2:31
8.	"The Day My Baby Gave Me a Surprise (Demo)"	M. Mothersbaugh	Duty Now for the Future album demo; recorded c. late 1978/early 1979	3:32
9.	"Bushwhacked (Prosthetic Version)"		Live jam recorded on 2-track tape during Freedom of Choice sessions in 1979. Edited version released as a flexi-disc with Reflex Magazine in August 1988.	4:41
10.	"Girl U Want (Demo Alternate Version)"		Freedom of Choice album demo, recorded at Modern Music studio, 1980	2:59
11.	"Turn Around (Demo Alternate Version)"		Freedom of Choice album demo, recorded at Modern Music studio, 1980	2:12
12.	"Snowball (Demo Alternate Version)"		Freedom of Choice album demo, recorded at Modern Music studio, 1980	2:49
13.	"Luv & Such"	M. Mothersbaugh	Freedom of Choice album demo, recorded at Modern Music studio, 1980; early version of "Mr. B's Ballroom"	2:53
14.	"Gates of Steel (Demo Alternate Version)"	M. Mothersbaugh, Casale, Susan Schmidt, Deborah Smith	Freedom of Choice album demo, recorded at Modern Music studio, 1980	3:29
15.	"Planet Earth (Demo Alternate Version)"	Casale	Freedom of Choice album demo, recorded at Modern Music studio, 1980	3:17
16.	"Whip It (Demo Alternate Version)"		Freedom of Choice album demo, recorded at Modern Music studio, 1980	2:39
17.	"Cold War (Demo Alternate Version)"	B. Mothersbaugh, Casale	Freedom of Choice album demo, recorded at Modern Music studio, 1980	2:33
18.	"Time Bomb"		Freedom of Choice album demo, recorded at Modern Music studio, 1980; Mark Mothersbaugh vocal version	3:14
19.	"That's Pep (Demo Alternate Version)"	M. Mothersbaugh	Freedom of Choice album demo, recorded at Modern Music studio, 1980	2:32
20.	"Make Me Dance" (labelled "Make Me Move")		Freedom of Choice outtake, recorded February 11, 1980	2:16
21.	"Gotta Serve Somebody (Live)"	Bob Dylan	Recorded December 31, 1980 at Long Beach Arena, Long Beach, California; performed by Devo alter ego "Dove", with vocal by Booji Boy	6:31
22.	"I Saw Jesus"		Studio demo by "Dove"; recorded April 1, 1981	1:31
23.	"Psychology of Desire (Demo)"		New Traditionalists album demo, recorded April 3, 1981; early version of "The Super Thing"	4:23
24.	"Pity You (Demo)" (labelled "You Say You Gotta Problem")	M. Mothersbaugh	New Traditionalists album demo, recorded March 24, 1981	2:54

All tracks are written by Mark Mothersbaugh and Gerald V. Casale, unless otherwise noted.

Sequence B (Disc two)
No.	Title	Writer(s)	Notes	Length
1.	"Beautiful World (Demo)"		New Traditionalists album demo, recorded March 24, 1981	3:41
2.	"Race of Doom (Demo)"		New Traditionalists album demo, recorded March/April 1981	3:44
3.	"I Desire (Demo)"	M. Mothersbaugh, Casale, John Hinckley	Oh, No! It's Devo album demo, recorded early 1982	3:18
4.	"Big Mess (Demo)"		Oh, No! It's Devo album demo; music recorded March 27, 1981 as "Chinese Nighttime", vocals recorded 1982; M. Mothersbaugh vocal version	2:48
5.	"The 4th Dimension (Alternate Version Rough Mix)"		For potential Shout album, recorded c. late 1982	4:19
6.	"Here to Go (Alternate Version Rough Mix)"		For potential Shout album, recorded c. late 1982	3:18
7.	"Some Things Don't Change (Rough Mix)"		For potential Shout album, recorded c. late 1982; unused	2:55
8.	"Big Adventure (Rough Mix)"	M. Mothersbaugh	For potential Shout album, recorded c. late 1982; unused; lyrics written and sung by M. Mothersbaugh	2:46
9.	"No Noise (Rough Mix)"		For potential Shout album, recorded c. late 1982; unused; same music as "Big Adventure", with lyrics written and sung by G. Casale	2:50
10.	"Love Is Stronger Than Dirt"		Demo recorded May 20, 1982	2:11
11.	"Faster and Faster"	M. Mothersbaugh	Unfinished recording from Oh, No! It's Devo sessions, recorded June 1982; restored, remixed and completed in November 1998 for CD-ROM video game Interstate '82	2:49
12.	"Modern Life"	M. Mothersbaugh	Unfinished recording from Oh, No! It's Devo sessions, recorded June 1982; restored, remixed and completed in November 1998 for CD-ROM video game Interstate '82	3:05
13.	"The Only One (Demo)"	M. Mothersbaugh	Demo from post-Warner Bros. Devo Demos 86-87 cassette; vocals by Toni Basil	4:06
14.	"Baby Doll (Demo)"		Demo from post-Warner Bros. Devo Demos 86-87 cassette; re-recorded for Total Devo album	3:37
15.	"Some Things Never Change (Demo)"		Demo from post-Warner Bros. Devo Demos 86-87 cassette; re-recorded for Total Devo album	5:28
16.	"Plain Truth (Demo)"		Demo from post-Warner Bros. Devo Demos 86-87 cassette; re-recorded for Total Devo album	4:00
17.	"Happy Guy (Demo)"		Demo from post-Warner Bros. Devo Demos 86-87 cassette; re-recorded for Total Devo album	3:33
18.	"Somewhere With Devo (Studio Version Demo)"	Leonard Bernstein, Stephen Sondheim / M. Mothersbaugh, Casale	Suite featuring "Somewhere", "Shout", "Social Fools" and "Disco Dancer"; later recorded live for Now It Can Be Told: Devo at the Palace album	18:23

== Personnel ==
Devo

- Mark Mothersbaugh – vocals, keyboards, guitars
- Gerald V. Casale – vocals, bass, keyboards
- Bob Mothersbaugh – lead guitar, vocals
- Bob Casale – rhythm guitar, keyboards, vocals
- Alan Myers – drums (1976–1985)
- David Kendrick – drums (1986–1987)
- Jim Mothersbaugh – drums (1974–1976)

Technical

- Devo – original recording producers
- Roland Worthington Hand – compilation producer
- Josh Mancell – compilation assistance, tape research
- Rectangle Van Elk – curator assistant
- D K Baker – deputy chief archivist
- Kanona Nooksack — archival assistance
- Dan Hersch – remastering
- Bill Inglot – remastering
- Bryan Lasley – art direction, design
- Patrick Pending – art direction assistant, design assistant
- Devo, Inc – artwork, photography
- John Tremblay – photography
- Barbara Watson – photography
- Janet Macoska – photography
- Hugh Brown – photography
