= Mechanical Man (EP) =

Mechanical Man EP

EP by Devo
- Released: 1978
- Recorded: 1975–1976
- Genres: Punk rock; new wave; art punk
- Length: 13:48
- Label: Elevator
- Producer: Devo

Devo chronology
B Stiff EP (1978)	Mechanical Man EP (1978)	Q: Are We Not Men? A: We Are Devo! (1978)

Mechanical Man is an extended play (EP) by American new wave band Devo, released in 1978 by Elevator Records. It includes four home demos by the band recorded before they were signed to Warner Bros. Records.

== Background ==
The EP was released as a 7-inch record housed in a plain sleeve that came in a variety of colors including pink, blue, red, yellow and green. Most EP sleeves were numbered on the back, although the exact number pressed is unknown.

Opinions differ as to the legitimacy of the EP, with some sources considering it a bootleg. In a Trouser Press article on the band dating from January 1979, Cole Springer refers to it as a bootleg of British origin. However, Devo webmaster and archivist Michael Pilmer later stated that it was produced by Virgin Records and included with some copies of the band's 1978 debut album Q: Are We Not Men? A: We Are Devo! in the UK. In 2023, Devo co-founder Gerald Casale called the songs on the EP "the five tracks we were most excited about at the time".

"Blockhead" later appeared on Devo's 1979 album Duty Now for the Future; that album also features "Clockout", a rework of "Blackout". "Auto-Modown" includes the unlisted track "Space Girl Blues".

== Recording ==
"Mechanical Man" and "Auto-Modown" were recorded in 1975, when the band was a quartet and Jim Mothersbaugh was their drummer. "Blackout" was recorded in 1976, by which time Bob Casale had joined and Alan Myers had replaced Mothersbaugh.

== Reissue ==
In 2023, Electronic Sound magazine repressed a limited edition of the Mechanical Man EP on yellow 7-inch vinyl and offered it as a bundle with issue 103, a 100-page celebration of Devo's 50th anniversary. The bundle became their fastest-selling issue ever, quickly selling out on the website, and the magazine later made a poster of the cover available for sale.

== Track listing ==
Side one

No.	Title	Writer(s)	Length
1.	"Mechanical Man"	Mark Mothersbaugh	3:27
2.	"Blockhead"	Bob Mothersbaugh, M. Mothersbaugh	3:08

Side two

No.	Title	Writer(s)	Length
1.	"Blackout"	Gerald Casale	3:11
2.	"Auto-Modown" (Includes hidden track "Space Girl Blues")	G. Casale	3:51

== Personnel ==
Instrumental credits adapted from liner notes of 2013 Superior Viaduct reissues of Hardcore Devo: Volume One (1990) and Hardcore Devo: Volume Two (1991). Credits for "Blockhead" cannot be confirmed.

Devo

- Mark Mothersbaugh – synthesizers (all tracks); vocals (A1)
- Gerald Casale – bass guitar (A1, B1, B2), vocals (B1, B2)
- Bob Mothersbaugh – electric guitar (A1, B1, B2)
- Jim Mothersbaugh – electronic drums (A1, B2)
- Bob Casale – electric guitar (B1)
- Alan Myers – drums (B1)

Technical

- Devo (as "Mechanical Man") – producers
