= Hot Potatoes: The Best of Devo =

Greatest hits album by Devo
- Released: 7 September 1993
- Recorded: October 1977–September 1982
- Genre: Art rock; new wave; post-punk; punk rock; synth-pop
- Length: 59:14
- Label: Virgin
- Producer: Brian Eno; Ken Scott; Robert Margouleff; Roy Thomas Baker; Devo

Devo chronology
Devo Live: The Mongoloid Years (1992)	Hot Potatoes: The Best of Devo (1993)	Adventures of the Smart Patrol (1996)

Hot Potatoes: The Best of Devo is a compilation of songs by American new wave band Devo, released in 1993 by Virgin Records in the United Kingdom. It contains an exclusive remix of "Whip It" by Psychoslaphead. Originally released on CD and cassette formats, a double-LP edition by Simply Vinyl was later released in 2001.

== Critical reception ==
Professional ratings
Review scores
Source	Rating
Allmusic	4.5/5 stars

Steve Huey of Allmusic called Hot Potatoes "the best available single-disc overview of Devo's career, hitting nearly all of the most significant moments from their first five albums", and "superior to the American Greatest Hits, which for some reason does not feature 'Mongoloid', one of the most obvious choices for a Devo hits collection."

== Track listing ==
All tracks are written by Mark Mothersbaugh and Gerald Casale, except where otherwise indicated.

No.	Title	Writer(s)	Album	Length
1.	"Jocko Homo"	Mark Mothersbaugh	Q: Are We Not Men? A: We Are Devo! (1978)	3:37
2.	"Mongoloid"	Gerald Casale	Q: Are We Not Men? A: We Are Devo!	3:44
3.	"Satisfaction (I Can't Get No)"	Mick Jagger, Keith Richards	Q: Are We Not Men? A: We Are Devo!	2:40
4.	"Whip It"		Freedom of Choice (1980)	2:39
5.	"Girl U Want"		Freedom of Choice	2:57
6.	"Freedom of Choice"		Freedom of Choice	3:28
7.	"Peek-a-Boo!"		Oh, No! It's Devo (1982)	3:03
8.	"Through Being Cool"	G. Casale, M. Mothersbaugh, Bob Mothersbaugh	New Traditionalists (1981)	3:12
9.	"That's Good"		Oh, No! It's Devo	3:25
10.	"Working in the Coal Mine"	Allen Toussaint	New Traditionalists	2:49
11.	"Devo Corporate Anthem"	M. Mothersbaugh	Duty Now for the Future (1979)	1:14
12.	"Be Stiff"	Bob Lewis, G. Casale	Single A-side (1978)	2:35
13.	"Gates of Steel"	G. Casale, M. Mothersbaugh, Sue Schmidt, Debbie Smith	Freedom of Choice	3:28
14.	"Come Back Jonee"		Q: Are We Not Men? A: We Are Devo!	3:23
15.	"Secret Agent Man"	P. F. Sloan, Steve Barri	Duty Now for the Future	3:36
16.	"The Day My Baby Gave Me a Surprize"	M. Mothersbaugh	Duty Now for the Future	2:42
17.	"Beautiful World"		New Traditionalists	3:33
18.	"Big Mess"		Oh, No! It's Devo	2:46
19.	"Whip It (HMS & M Mix)" (Remixed by Psychoslaphead)		Previously unreleased	7:41
Total length:				59:14

== Personnel ==
Devo

- Mark Mothersbaugh
- Gerald Casale
- Bob Mothersbaugh
- Bob Casale
- Alan Myers

Technical

- Brian Eno – producer (1–3, 12, 14)
- Roy Thomas Baker – producer (7, 9, 18)
- Devo – producer (8, 10, 17), co-producer (4–6, 13, 19)
- Ken Scott – producer, engineer (11, 15, 16)
- Robert Margouleff – co-producer (4–6, 13, 19)
- David Quantick – liner notes
