= Hardcore Devo =

Hardcore Devo may mean:

- Hardcore Devo: Volume One, the first volume (1990) of a pair of albums by Devo
- Hardcore Devo: Volume Two, the second volume (1991) of a pair of albums by Devo
- Hardcore Devo Live!, a concert film and live album (2014), by Devo
