= Mothersbaugh =

Mothersbaugh is a surname. It is an anglicized version of the German surname Muttersbach, meaning "mother stream."

This surname can refer to the three American brothers who have had links with the avant-garde rock band Devo:

- Mark Mothersbaugh (born 1950), musician and co-founder of Devo
- Bob Mothersbaugh (born 1952), guitarist
- Jim Mothersbaugh (born 1956), early drummer and later equipment technician
