= Smooth Noodle Maps =

- CD cover, emulated for the 2019 LP reissue

Studio album by Devo
- Released: June 1990
- Recorded: October 1989 – January 1990
- Studio: Master Control (Burbank)
- Genre: Dance-pop
- Length: 34:28
- Label: Enigma
- Producer: Devo

Devo chronology
Now It Can Be Told: Devo at the Palace (1989)	Smooth Noodle Maps (1990)	Hardcore Devo: Volume One (1990)

Singles from Smooth Noodle Maps
- 1. "Stuck in a Loop" Released: June 1990; 2. "Post Post-Modern Man" Released: October 1990

Smooth Noodle Maps (stylized as smoothnoodlemaps) is the eighth studio album by the American new wave band Devo. It was originally released in June 1990 and would be their last album released through Enigma. The album was recorded over a period of three months between October 1989 and January 1990, at Master Control Studios, in Burbank, California. Smooth Noodle Maps was Devo's last full-length studio album until the release of Something for Everybody in 2010, as well as the last Devo studio album to feature David Kendrick on drums.

"Post Post-Modern Man" hit No. 7 on the Billboard Modern Rock Tracks chart for the week of August 11, 1990 and No. 26 on Billboard's Hot Dance/Club Play chart for the week of September 29, 1990.

== Artwork and packaging ==
Devo member Gerald Casale was reading James Gleick's 1987 book Chaos: Making a New Science during the making of the album, which resulted in a visit to Jet Propulsion Laboratory in Pasadena, California, where they had constructed computer-generated models of chaos theory. In December 2018, Casale stated, "The animations were called SMOOTH NOODLE MAPS. They resembled neo-psychedelic, spiraling, multi-colored fluids like the type projected in concert on screens behind bands during the acid-fueled 1960s. But they were 'high tech' at the same time, floating in a black void." After being informed that these animations were available on film, Casale requested to license them for use on Devo's upcoming album and was granted permission, with the images subsequently used on the LP, CD and poster. The visit also inspired the lyrics for the album's song "A Change Is Gonna Cum".

Smooth Noodle Maps was also issued on limited edition red vinyl by the Dutch East India Trading label.

== Promotion ==
Two music videos were made for the album's second single, "Post Post-Modern Man". The first, which was directed by Devo co-founder and bassist Gerald Casale and was never officially released, saw the band driving a Lincoln Town Car along the desolate Interstate 10 in Southern California. According to Casale, when the finished video was delivered to Enigma Records, they demanded the video include March 1990's Playboy Playmate of the Month, Deborah Driggs, in order to make it more marketable. After acquiescing to Enigma's demands, MTV then rejected the video because it used the "Macro Post Modern Mix" of the song instead of the "college alternative track" they wanted to market, as featured on the original album. This resulted in a second video directed by Rocky Schenck, which featured Devo in a spoof of the Home Shopping Network, selling various Devo-related merchandise.

Casale later stated that "Enigma failed to bring our record to market in any serious way. It was what is known in the industry as a 'soft' release." The unsuccessful album and subsequent tour of the U.S. and UK led to Devo parting ways with Enigma and going into "self-imposed hibernation." Devo would not perform again until a reunion gig at the Sundance Film Festival of 1996.

In an interview for their 1996 computer game Adventures of the Smart Patrol, Mark Mothersbaugh stated:

Around '88, '89, '90 maybe, we did our last tour in Europe, and it was kind of at that point, we were watching This Is Spinal Tap on the bus and said, "Oh my God, that's our life." And we just said, "Things have to change." So we kind of agreed from there that we wouldn't do live shows anymore.

== Reissue ==
In 2019, Futurismo Inc. issued a two-disc deluxe edition of Smooth Noodle Maps, on both CD and vinyl formats. The double CD set comes housed in a digipak while the double LP comes in three vinyl color variations. Both formats include gatefold sleeves with die-cut windows and changeable covers, a fold-out poster and liner notes from band member Gerald Casale.

== Critical reception ==
Professional ratings
Review scores
Source	Rating
AllMusic	2/5 stars
Robert Christgau	(dud)

Village Voice critic Robert Christgau awarded the album a "Dud" rating, which meant he did not write a review to accompany it. In retrospective reviews, AllMusic's Steve Huey noted that while the album was "inconsistent, especially in terms of subject matter, the band does try some new ideas in its arrangements." Similarly, Mark Prindle noted that the album "features newer synths and an attempt to incorporate dance elements into Devo's late-period faceless boring dance-pop, but it's just as hookless, generic and dated as its two predecessors."

In 2023, Smooth Noodle Maps placed at No. 33 on Rolling Stone's list of "50 Genuinely Horrible Albums Made by Brilliant Artists", with writer Andy Greene opining that "The album attempted to infuse Devo's music with elements of contemporary dance-pop, but it simply didn't work. [...] Mark Mothersbaugh was already devoting much of his time to TV and movie projects when Devo cut this record, and it sounds like his mind was clearly somewhere else."

== Track listing ==
All tracks are written by Mark Mothersbaugh and Gerald Casale, except "Morning Dew", by Bonnie Dobson.

No.	Title	Length
1.	"Stuck in a Loop"	3:52
2.	"Post Post-Modern Man"	2:55
3.	"When We Do It"	2:57
4.	"Spin the Wheel"	3:46
5.	"Morning Dew"	3:01
6.	"A Change Is Gonna Cum"	3:10
7.	"The Big Picture"	2:45
8.	"Pink Jazz Trancers"	3:13
9.	"Jimmy"	2:51
10.	"Devo Has Feelings Too"	2:40
11.	"Dawghaus"	3:23
Total length:		34:28

== Personnel ==
Credits adapted from Pioneers Who Got Scalped: The Anthology CD liner notes:

Devo

- Mark Mothersbaugh – vocals, keyboards, guitar
- Gerald Casale – vocals, bass guitar, keyboards
- Bob Mothersbaugh – lead guitar, vocals
- Bob Casale – rhythm guitar, keyboards, vocals
- David Kendrick – drums

Credits adapted from the original album's liner notes:

Additional musician

- Frank Schubert – guitar (tracks 10–11)

Technical

- Devo – producer
- Bob Casale – engineer
- Andrew Ballard – assistant engineer
- Jeff Lord Alge – mixing
- Ryan S. Moore – digital programming
- Marty Frazoo – technical assistance
- Björn Almstedt – mastering
- Pat Dillon – art direction
- Gerald Casale – art direction, graphic concepts
- Laddy Van Jansky – photography
- Claudia Fitzpatrick-Taylor – digital realization (Digital Design Centre)
- Phillip S. Marcus – computer animation of Jupiter
- Nicholas Socci – computer animation of Jupiter
