= Devo Presents Adventures of the Smart Patrol (album) =

Adventures of the Smart Patrol

Compilation album by Devo
- Released: 1996
- Recorded: 1974–1996
- Genre: New wave
- Length: 35:30
- Label: Discovery
- Producer: Devo

Devo chronology
Hot Potatoes: The Best of Devo (1993)	Adventures of the Smart Patrol (1996)	Pioneers Who Got Scalped: The Anthology (2000)

Professional ratings
Review scores
Source	Rating
AllMusic	2/5 stars

Adventures of the Smart Patrol (or Devo Presents Music from Adventures of the Smart Patrol) is a compilation album featuring tracks from the 1996 Inscape CD-ROM computer game of the same name created by American new wave band Devo. It was released in 1996 by Discovery Records.

== Contents ==
Six of the tracks had been previously released on proper Devo albums and compilations, but the album is noteworthy for containing two new Devo tracks: "Theme from Adventures of the Smart Patrol" (a studio recording of a song that had been played live at the beginning of concerts on the 1981 New Traditionalists tour) and "That's What He Said." Both songs are credited to the Smart Patrol but are performed by Devo.

Also of note is this mix of "U Got Me Bugged," a track which first appeared on the compilation Hardcore Devo: Volume 2 (1991), as it features a new vocal track by Booji Boy.

Additionally, this version of "Jocko Homo" is the 4-track demo version, previously released on Hardcore Devo: Volume One (1990). However, this version was taken directly from the audio track of the short film The Truth About De-Evolution (1976) and is thus of lesser sound quality. It also includes audio from the film sequence where a series of rapid-fire cuts spell the letters "Devo" to introduce the song, lifted from the intro of "Mechanical Man" (also found on Hardcore Devo: Volume One).

== Track listing ==
All tracks are written by Mark Mothersbaugh and Gerald Casale, except where noted.

No.	Title	Writer(s)	Credited artist	Length
1.	"Theme from Adventures of the Smart Patrol"	M. Mothersbaugh	The Smart Patrol	2:29
2.	"That's What He Said"		The Smart Patrol	3:15
3.	"Mechanical Man" (From Hardcore Devo: Volume One, 1990)	M. Mothersbaugh	Devo	4:20
4.	"U Got Me Bugged"	M. Mothersbaugh	Mark Mothersbaugh	2:49
5.	"34C"	Brian Applegate	Brian Applegate	3:35
6.	"The Spirit of JFK"	Scott Orsi	Scott Orsi	3:17
7.	"Peek-a-Boo!" (From Oh, No! It's Devo, 1982)		Devo	3:02
8.	"Beautiful World" (From New Traditionalists, 1981)		Devo	3:32
9.	"Whip It" (From Freedom of Choice, 1980)		Devo	2:38
10.	"Freedom of Choice" (From Freedom of Choice, 1980)		Devo	3:27
11.	"Jocko Homo" (From The Truth About De-Evolution, 1976)		Devo	3:06
Total length:				35:30
