= Hardcore Devo Live! =

Live album (CD, LP, DVD, Blu-ray) by Devo
- Released: February 24, 2015
- Recorded: June 28, 2014
- Venue: Fox Theatre (Oakland, California)
- Genre: Experimental rock
- Length: 74:59 (CD/LP); 84:42 (DVD)
- Label: MVD Audio (CD/LP); MVD Visual (DVD)
- Director: Keirda Bahruth (DVD)
- Producer: Devo

Devo chronology
Something Else for Everybody (2013)	Hardcore Devo Live! (2015)	50 Years of De-Evolution 1973–2023 (2023)

Alternative covers
- DVD Cover

Professional ratings
Review scores
Source	Rating
AllMusic	4/5 stars

Hardcore Devo Live! is a concert film and live album, showcasing Devo's June 28, 2014, performance at the Fox Theatre in Oakland, California on the 2014 Hardcore Devo Live tour. The tour commemorates the 40th anniversary of the band and pays tribute to former band member Bob Casale, who died February 17, 2014. The set list exclusively focuses on songs written between 1974 and 1977, before Devo had a recording contract. Many of the songs had not been performed by the band since 1977. While the music is largely performed as a quartet, the band is augmented offstage by Brian Applegate on additional keyboards and bass guitar.

The show is performed in two-halves; the first, focusing on earlier material, is presented with the band seated, in street clothes, with minimal lighting, as if the audience were watching them rehearsing in a basement. After "Midget", the band puts on blue coveralls, as worn in early live shows, adding songs that would later appear on Q: Are We Not Men? A: We Are Devo! (1978) and Duty Now for the Future (1979). The band is joined on the final song of the night, "Clockout", by Bob Casale's son Alex on bass.

Interviews with the surviving band members, as well as V. Vale and Toni Basil, are interspersed into the performance. A "Concert-Only" option is available on the DVD and Blu-ray releases.

== Track listing ==
Adapted from the album's liner notes.

No.	Title	Writer(s)	Original demo recording date	Length
1.	"Mechanical Man"	Mark Mothersbaugh	1975	6:00
2.	"Auto Modown"	Gerald Casale	1974	2:07
3.	"Space Girl Blues"	G. Casale	1974	2:01
4.	"Baby Talkin' Bitches"	G. Casale, Bob Mothersbaugh	1975	2:42
5.	"Fraulein"	M. Mothersbaugh	1975	3:45
6.	"I Been Refused"	G. Casale	1974	2:44
7.	"Bamboo Bimbo"	G. Casale, M. Mothersbaugh	1975	3:50
8.	"Beehive"	G. Casale, Peter Gregg	1974	2:48
9.	"Midget"	G. Casale, B. Mothersbaugh	1975	3:27
10.	"Satisfaction"	Mick Jagger, Keith Richards	1977	4:01
11.	"Timing X/Soo Bawls"	M. Mothersbaugh	1976	3:59
12.	"Stop, Look, and Listen"	M. Mothersbaugh	1976	2:45
13.	"O No"	G. Casale, M. Mothersbaugh	1974	3:00
14.	"Be Stiff"	G. Casale, Bob Lewis	1974	2:59
15.	"Uncontrollable Urge"	M. Mothersbaugh	1977	3:42
16.	"Social Fools"	G. Casale	1975	3:20
17.	"Jocko Homo"	M. Mothersbaugh	1975	5:18
18.	"Fountain of Filth"	G. Casale, Bob Casale	1977	4:14
19.	"Gut Feeling"	M. Mothersbaugh, B. Mothersbaugh	1977	4:13
20.	"U Got Me Bugged" (Booji Boy)	M. Mothersbaugh	1975	3:10
21.	"Clockout"	G. Casale	1976	4:54
Total length:				74:59

Note

- The uncredited audio playback "Booji Boy's Funeral" precedes Booji Boy's live performance of "U Got Me Bugged".

DVD extras

- Concert only version
- Alternate opening
- Building Satisfaction guitar

== Personnel ==
Credits adapted from CD liner notes:

Devo

- Mark Mothersbaugh – lead vocals, synthesizers, keyboards, EFX guitar
- Bob Mothersbaugh – vocals, rhythm guitar, lead guitar
- Gerald Casale – lead vocals, bass guitar, percussion
- Josh Freese – drums

Additional musicians

- Brian Applegate – keyboards on "Bamboo Bimbo" and "Social Fools", bass guitar on "Midget"
- Alex Casale – bass guitar on "Clockout"

Technical

- Devo – producer
- Paul David Hager – record mix engineer
- Ray Amico – sound recordist
- Isaac Betesh – vinyl mastering
- Mark Moskin – packaging photos
- Mike Altishin – packaging photos
- Michael Pilmer – packaging photos
- Raymond Ahner – packaging photos
- Daniel Noble – packaging photos
- Sabrina Koerber – packaging design

Credits adapted from DVD liner notes:

Technical

- Keirda Bahruth – director, producer
- Richard Ballard – editor, producer
- Ed Seaman – producer
- Gerald Casale – producer
- Scott Pourroy – producer
- Bruce Dickson – director of photography
- Sabrina Koerber – packaging design
- Devo – concert audio producer
- Ray Amico – concert audio recordist
- Paul David Hager – concert audio mixing
