= Run Hit Wonder =

Road running events sponsored by Nike

Run Hit Wonder was a 5K and 10K run series sponsored by Nike. It started in 2003 and was held in 2004 and 2005 before being renamed "Run Hit Remix" in 2006. Events were held in several cities around the United States, each with popular one-hit-wonder bands playing along the course and at a post-race concert.

In 2004, the bands included: A Flock of Seagulls, Devo, General Public, Tone Loc, Tommy Tutone, and The Run Hit Wonders (a 1980s cover band created by Nike for the event).

In 2005, the event was held in New York (July 20), Portland (July 24), Chicago (13 September) and Los Angeles (September 24), and includes: Joan Jett and the Blackhearts, The Aquabats, Chingy, The Donnas, Fountains of Wayne, Nina Sky, and DJ Z-Trip.
