= Hardcore Devo: Volume Two =

Compilation album by Devo
- Released: August 23, 1991
- Recorded: April 1974 – December 1977
- Genre: Proto-punk; art rock
- Length: 66:01
- Label: Rykodisc

Devo chronology
Hardcore Devo: Volume One (1990)	Hardcore Devo: Volume Two (1991)	Devo Live: The Mongoloid Years (1992)

Professional ratings
Review scores
Source	Rating
AllMusic	link
Pitchfork Media	7.9/10

Hardcore Devo: Volume Two is the last of two collections of demos by the American new wave band Devo, released on August 23, 1991, by Rykodisc.

== Background ==
The Hardcore Devo albums are collections of 4-track basement demos recorded by the band between April 1974 and December 1977. The early recordings were made using a TEAC 4-track recorder and incorporated guitars, Minimoog, bass guitar and homemade electronic drums, the latter built and performed by Jim Mothersbaugh.

Some tracks are early versions of songs that Devo would later rerecord for their studio albums, including a few that became some of their best known (e.g. "Be Stiff"). However, the majority of the tracks were never revisited and remained unreleased until the Hardcore Devo compilations.

Hardcore Devo: Volume Two was out of print for years; however, it was re-issued by Superior Viaduct in 2013, both as a vinyl release (May 2013) and a CD containing both volumes and bonus tracks (July 2013).

== Track listing ==
No.	Title	Writer(s)	Recording Date	Length
1.	"Booji Boy's Funeral"	Mark Mothersbaugh	1977	3:59
2.	"Can U Take It?"	Gerald Casale	1974	3:00
3.	"Bamboo Bimbo"	G. Casale; M. Mothersbaugh	1975	3:16
4.	"A Plan for U"	G. Casale	1974	3:11
5.	"The Rope Song"	G. Casale; Bob Lewis	1974	3:21
6.	"Goo Goo Itch"	M. Mothersbaugh	1976	2:17
7.	"Be Stiff"	G. Casale; Lewis	1974	3:19
8.	"All of Us"	G. Casale	1974	4:53
9.	"Baby Talkin' Bitches"	G. Casale; Bob Mothersbaugh	1975	2:25
10.	"I Need a Chick"	G. Casale; Peter Gregg	1974	2:51
11.	"U Got Me Bugged"	M. Mothersbaugh	1975	2:45
12.	"Chango"	G. Casale; M. Mothersbaugh	1975	3:10
13.	"Fraulein"	M. Mothersbaugh	1975	3:06
14.	"Dogs of Democracy"	M. Mothersbaugh	1976	3:25
15.	"37"	G. Casale; B. Mothersbaugh	1975	2:57
16.	"Bottled Up"	G. Casale	1976	2:21
17.	"Working in the Coal Mine"	Allen Toussaint	1977	3:13
18.	"I Been Refused"	G. Casale	1974	3:32
19.	"Fountain of Filth"	G. Casale; Bob Casale	1977	3:09
20.	"Clockout"	G. Casale	1976	3:09
21.	"Let's Go"	M. Mothersbaugh	1977	2:42
Total length:				66:01

Bonus tracks on 2013 Superior Viaduct re-release
No.	Title	Writer(s)	Recording Date	Length
22.	"Man from the Past"	G. Casale	1974	3:22
23.	"Doghouse Doghouse"	G. Casale	1974	2:40
24.	"Hubert House"	G. Casale; M. Mothersbaugh	1975	1:50
25.	"Shimmy Shake"	B. Mothersbaugh	1975	2:57

== Personnel ==
Credits adapted from liner notes of Superior Viaduct 2013 reissue:

Devo

- Gerald Casale – lead vocals (2, 4–5, 7–8, 10–12, 16–20, 22–23), backing vocals (3, 9, 13), bass guitar, drums (16), acoustic guitar (23)
- Mark Mothersbaugh – vocals (3, 6, 12–14, 17, 21, 24), synthesizers
- Bob Mothersbaugh – lead vocals (9, 15, 25), background vocals (8), guitar
- Jim Mothersbaugh – drums (1–15, 18)

Additional personnel

- Bob Casale – additional guitar (8, 17, 19–20)
- Alan Myers – drums (17, 19–20)
- Bob Lewis – additional guitar (5, 8)
- Booji Boy – vocals (11)

Technical

Credits adapted from liner notes of original Rykodisc 1991 issue:

- Devo – engineers, mixing
- Bernie Grundman – mastering
- Barbara Watson – photography
- Lisa Laarman – design

Credits adapted from Devo: The Brand (2018):

- Devo – photo concept, art direction
- Moshe Brakha – photography

== See also ==
- Hardcore Devo: Volume One
