= General Boy =

Character created by new wave band Devo

General Boy is a character created around 1975 by American new wave band Devo. He is usually seen portrayed by Robert Mothersbaugh, Sr., the father of Devo's lead singer Mark Mothersbaugh, former drummer Jim Mothersbaugh, and lead guitarist Bob Mothersbaugh.

== History ==
General Boy, along with his son Booji Boy, were first introduced in the 1976 short film The Truth About De-Evolution. Both characters have made numerous appearances in various short films, music videos, written propaganda and even concerts by the band.

Both characters were also incorporated into Devo's 1996 PC CD-ROM video game Devo Presents Adventures of the Smart Patrol (with Booji Boy being re-christened "Boogie Boy"). The booklet of the game claims that the Boys' true last name was Rothwell and that Booji Boy's true name was Craig Allen Rothwell.

The game's booklet also contained more information about General Boy's back story:

General Boy's career as a military intelligence officer was cut short over his claim that he experienced an alien abduction. He was made to undergo psychiatric testing which resulted in progressive mental instability. Shortly after his son's transformation into Boogie Boy, he stopped answering to Mr. Rothwell and became General Boy out of love and sympathy for his son.

General Boy was portrayed by actor Tom Finnegan in the game. However, Robert Mothersbaugh, Sr. reprised his role as General Boy at the annual 2002 DEVOtional event held in Cleveland, Ohio.

Under the General Boy pseudonym, Robert Mothersbaugh, Sr. is credited as a co-writer on "Enough Said", the closing track of Devo's 1981 album New Traditionalists.

Robert Mothersbaugh, Sr. died in 2016.
