= Now It Can Be Told: Devo at the Palace =

Live album by Devo
- Released: 1989
- Recorded: December 9, 1988
- Venue: The Palace (Hollywood, Los Angeles)
- Genre: New wave
- Length: 60:01
- Label: Enigma
- Producer: Gerald Casale; Bob Casale

Devo chronology
Total Devo (1988)	Now It Can Be Told: Devo at the Palace (1989)	Smooth Noodle Maps (1990)

Professional ratings
Review scores
Source	Rating
AllMusic	link

Now It Can Be Told: Devo at the Palace is a live album by American new wave band Devo, released on December 9, 1988 by Enigma Records. The album was recorded during their 1988 "comeback tour" in promotion of their seventh studio album Total Devo.

Music historian Andy Zax noted that the album presented reshaped versions of old songs from the band's repertoire as well as some new material, including a "twangy country ballad" version of "Jocko Homo" and the new composition "It Doesn't Matter to Me", "sounding like a long lost '60s folk-rock nugget".

The album's closing track is an eleven-minute medley of "Shout", "Somewhere" from West Side Story and "Disco Dancer". A longer studio version totaling 18 minutes later appeared on the 2000 Devo rarities compilation Recombo DNA.

== Artwork and packaging ==
The cover art and tagline were based on the 1971 book The Beginning Was the End. Initial vinyl pressings were double LPs that contained three sides of music and a fourth "blank" side with etched signatures from the band. The label of the fourth side was marked, "ATTENTION SPUDS! NO GROOVE! DO NOT PLAY!"

== Track listing ==
All tracks are written by Mark Mothersbaugh and Gerald Casale, except where noted.

Side one
No.	Title	Writer(s)	Length
1.	"Jocko Homo"	M. Mothersbaugh	3:51
2.	"It Doesn't Matter to Me"	M. Mothersbaugh	2:52
3.	"Going Under"		4:17
4.	"Working in a Coal Mine"	Allen Toussaint	3:59
5.	"Happy Guy"		3:22

Side two
No.	Title	Writer(s)	Length
1.	"That's Good"		3:31
2.	"Jerkin' Back 'n' Forth"		3:05
3.	"Girl U Want"		3:02
4.	"Whip It"		2:37
5.	"Baby Doll"		3:53
6.	"(I Can't Get No) Satisfaction"	Mick Jagger, Keith Richards	3:36

Side three
No.	Title	Writer(s)	Length
1.	"Uncontrollable Urge"	M. Mothersbaugh	3:28
2.	"Gut Feeling"	M. Mothersbaugh, Bob Mothersbaugh	3:13
3.	"Gates of Steel"	M. Mothersbaugh, G. Casale, Sue Schmidt, Debbie Smith	3:46
4.	"Somewhere With Devo (Suite includes "Shout" and "Disco Dancer")"		11:20
Total length:			60:01

== Personnel ==
Credits adapted from the album's liner notes.

Devo

- Mark Mothersbaugh – vocals, keyboards, guitar
- Gerald Casale – vocals, bass guitar, keyboards
- Bob Casale – guitar, keyboards, backing vocals
- Bob Mothersbaugh – guitar, backing vocals
- David Kendrick – drums

Technical

- Gerald Casale – producer, engineer, graphic concepts
- Bob Casale – producer, engineer
- Recorded by Westwood One
- Biff Dawes – engineer
- Mark Mothersbaugh – graphic concepts
- Patrick Pending – art direction
