= Devo (film) =

- Directed by: Chris Smith
- Produced by: Danny Gabai; Anita Greenspan; Chris Holmes; David C. McCourt
- Edited by: Joey Scoma
- Distributed by: Netflix
- Release dates: January 21, 2024 (Sundance); August 19, 2025 (Netflix)
- Running time: 94 minutes
- Countries: United States; United Kingdom
- Language: English

Devo is a 2024 documentary film about the new wave band Devo. It is directed by Chris Smith. It premiered at the 2024 Sundance Film Festival. The band performed at the event. The film was released on Netflix on August 19, 2025.

== Reception ==
=== Critical response ===
On the review aggregator website Rotten Tomatoes, 86% of 29 critics' reviews are positive, with an average rating of 7.9/10. The website's consensus reads: "Devo is a visually dazzling, music-filled documentary that playfully captures the band's eccentricity while offering a thoughtful exploration of their fight for artistic integrity." Metacritic, which uses a weighted average, assigned the film a score of 80 out of 100, based on 14 critics, indicating "generally favorable" reviews.

Matt Zoller Seitz of RogerEbert.com gave the film three and a half out of four stars and wrote, "This is a fun movie if you love the band, and maybe even if you've never heard of them before. The interviews are thought-provoking, funny, and moving; the filmmaking is superb, and the music kicks ass."

=== Accolades ===
Devo was nominated for Best Music Film at the 68th Annual Grammy Awards.
