= Be Stiff =

Single by Devo

from the album Be Stiff EP
- B-side: "Social Fools"
- Released: August 4, 1978
- Genre: New wave; punk rock
- Label: Stiff
- Songwriters: Gerald Casale; Bob Lewis
- Producers: A-side – Brian Eno; B-side – Devo

Devo singles chronology
"Jocko Homo" (1978)	"Be Stiff" (1978)	"Come Back Jonee" (1978)

"Be Stiff" is the third single by American new wave band Devo, released in 1978 by Stiff Records. The song was taken from the sessions for Q: Are We Not Men? A: We Are Devo! (1978), produced by Brian Eno. Guitarist Bob Lewis wrote the music and came up with the title concept, while bassist and singer Gerald Casale penned the verses.

The song became an anthem for Stiff, and was a minor success in the UK. It was covered multiple times, including on a Stiff-released EP of their own artists' interpretations. It was performed by the band in 1980 and live recordings appear on DEV-O Live (1981) and Devo Live 1980 (2005). It was also performed as an encore for the Freedom of Choice shows of Devo's November 2009 tour, and was included in the setlist of their 2014 Hardcore Devo Live! tour.

According to author Simon Reynolds, with its stop-start rhythms and angular arrangement, "Be Stiff" exemplified Devo's stance against soft rock complacency.

== Release history ==
An early demo of "Be Stiff" with a very different sound appears on the collection Hardcore Devo: Volume Two (1991), recorded in either 1974 or 1975.

In early 1978, Devo toured the UK for the first time and Stiff Records released three Devo singles in a row: "Jocko Homo" which charted at number 51; their arrangement of the Rolling Stones' "(I Can't Get No) Satisfaction", which reached number 41; and "Be Stiff", which rose to number 71. These three singles were later compiled on the B Stiff EP.

"Be Stiff" was also produced in London in limited quantities on clear and yellow vinyl, released at the same time as five colored vinyl versions of "Whoops-a-Daisy" by Stiff Records artist Humphrey Ocean and the Hardy Annuals.

== Covers and alternate versions ==
Following Devo's popular July 1978 performance at the Knebworth Festival, Stiff released an EP (catalog number ODD-2) featuring six artists from the Be Stiff '78 tour performing versions of "Be Stiff". The artists were Lene Lovich, Mickey Jupp, Wreckless Eric, Rachel Sweet, Jona Lewie, and the Be Stiff Ensemble (led by Lovich). A website devoted to Mickey Jupp offers the following review:

All versions were recorded on the Stiff mobile at a sound check during the tour one very cold October afternoon. Mickey Jupp's version is simply a twelve-bar. The guitar player, Peter Gosling, said, "We just played a twelve-bar a couple of times, Mickey wrote down some words and we recorded it the third time round. It was all over in half an hour." Wreckless Eric's version was done on the second play-through. He just sang the words, "Be Stiff" over and over again, then Brady suddenly decided to put in a bit out of Hendrix's "Purple Haze". "I fluffed it the first time but got it right two bars later," he reported. It's all there on the record. Rachel's version is plain country and Jona's is just Jona's. The final version on the album is the full blown live version. It was always moving to see five bands on stage laughing and joking their way through this last number in the set. The rhythm section is great... three drummers!

Live recordings of the song from Devo's 1980 tour have been released on DEV-O Live and Devo Live 1980, and an alternate demo version (erroneously labeled as an "alternate mix" of the single version) appears on the compilation Recombo DNA (2000).

In 1980, Devo backed singer/choreographer Toni Basil for a 12” single, contributing three of their own songs, including a new four-minute arrangement's of “Be Stiff.” The following year a shorter Devo-backed version appeared on Basil’s album Word of Mouth, and an even shorter version was used for Basil’s video album that aired in the United Kingdom. In live performances in the 1980s, Devo played the Toni Basil arrangement of “Be Stiff.”

The version of "Social Fools" featured on the B-side of the single is a Devo-produced studio version. A second studio version produced by Brian Eno was later issued as the B-side of the "Come Back Jonee" 7-inch single.

Big Business released a cover of "Be Stiff" on their 2006 Tour EP II.

== Chart positions ==
Chart (1978)	Peak position
UK Singles Chart	71
