= Interstate '82 =

1999 video game

- Developer: Activision
- Publisher: Activision
- Director: Zachary Norman
- Producers: Daiva Venckus; Doug Pearson
- Programmer: Marshall Robin
- Artist: Alexander Stein
- Writer: Zachary Norman
- Composer: Josh Mancell
- Platform: Microsoft Windows
- Release: NA: November 22, 1999; EU: December 10, 1999
- Genre: Vehicular combat
- Modes: Single-player, multiplayer

Interstate '82 is a vehicular combat video game developed and published by Activision for Microsoft Windows in 1999.

== Setting ==
The game is set in the Southwestern United States in an alternate version of the year 1982, during the Reagan Administration. The game is less complex than its predecessor, Interstate '76, lacking the detailed armor and weapon management of the original. Its play-style is closer to console-based vehicular combat games like Twisted Metal, with a single health bar displaying both armor and chassis strength, as opposed to '76's armor/chassis strength system. The vehicle models have been updated to reflect the change in era, and overall, the game has a new wave feel, with several hitherto-unreleased Devo songs being on the soundtrack, as opposed to the first game's funk-inspired style.

Interstate '82 features a story-mode like its predecessor, with one new option: the player can exit one vehicle and enter another, adding some strategy to the game's storyline. Another new addition is the ability to skin the new vehicle models.

== Reception ==
Reception

Aggregate score
Aggregator	Score
GameRankings	62%

Review scores
Publication	Score
CNET Gamecenter	5/10
Computer Games Strategy Plus	2.5/5
Computer Gaming World	2/5
EP Daily	6.5/10
Eurogamer	6/10
GamePro	3.5/5
GameRevolution	B
GameSpot	6.2/10
GameSpy	81%
GameZone	7/10
IGN	6.9/10
Next Generation	3/5
PC Accelerator	5/10
PC Gamer (US)	68%

The game received a bit more mixed reviews than the original according to the review aggregation website GameRankings. Eric Bratcher of NextGen said, "Some of the '80s nods may be missed by those who weren't paying attention back then, but the game is still fun."
