= Hardcore Devo: Volume One =

Compilation album by Devo
- Released: August 17, 1990
- Recorded: April 1974 – December 1977
- Genre: Proto-punk; art rock
- Length: 42:20
- Label: Rykodisc

Devo chronology
Smooth Noodle Maps (1990)	Hardcore Devo: Volume One (1990)	Hardcore Devo: Volume Two (1991)

Professional ratings
Review scores
Source	Rating
AllMusic	link
Robert Christgau	(dud)
Pitchfork Media	8.6/10

Hardcore Devo: Volume One is the first of two collections of demos by the American new wave band Devo, released on August 17, 1990, as a CD by Rykodisc. The French label Fan Club also released the album on LP that same year.

== Background ==
The Hardcore Devo albums are collections of 4-track basement demos recorded by the band between April 1974 and December 1977. The early recordings were made using a TEAC 4-track recorder and incorporated guitars, Minimoog, bass guitar and homemade electronic drums, the latter built and performed by Jim Mothersbaugh.

Some tracks are early versions of songs that Devo would later rerecord for their studio albums, including a few that became some of their best known (e.g. "Jocko Homo", "Mongoloid"). However, the majority of the tracks were never revisited and remained unreleased until the Hardcore Devo compilations.

Hardcore Devo: Volume One was out of print for years; however, it was re-issued by Superior Viaduct in 2013, both as a vinyl release (May 2013) and a CD containing both volumes and bonus tracks (July 2013).

== Track listing ==
No.	Title	Writer(s)	Recording Date	Length
1.	"Mechanical Man"	Mark Mothersbaugh	1975	4:23
2.	"Auto Modown"	Gerald Casale	1975	2:01
3.	"Space Girl Blues"	G. Casale	1975	1:52
4.	"Social Fools"	G. Casale	1975	3:41
5.	"Soo Bawlz"	M. Mothersbaugh	1976	2:43
6.	"(I Can't Get No) Satisfaction"	Mick Jagger, Keith Richards	1977	3:00
7.	"Jocko Homo"	M. Mothersbaugh	1974	2:56
8.	"Golden Energy"	M. Mothersbaugh	1976	2:32
9.	"Buttered Beauties"	M. Mothersbaugh, G. Casale	1974	3:38
10.	"Midget"	Bob Mothersbaugh, G. Casale	1976	2:41
11.	"I'm a Potato"	Bob Casale, G. Casale	1974	2:38
12.	"Uglatto"	G. Casale	1976	2:00
13.	"Stop Look and Listen"	M. Mothersbaugh	1976	2:33
14.	"Ono"	M. Mothersbaugh, G. Casale	1974	2:46
15.	"Mongoloid"	G. Casale	1977	3:34
Total length:				42:20

== Personnel ==
Credits adapted from liner notes of Superior Viaduct 2013 reissue:

Devo

- Gerald Casale – vocals (2–4, 9–12, 14–15), backing vocals (5, 6, 7), bass guitar
- Mark Mothersbaugh – vocals (1, 5–8, 13), backing vocals (9, 14), synthesizer
- Bob Mothersbaugh – backing vocals (4–7, 9–10, 15), guitar
- Jim Mothersbaugh – drums (1–4, 7–11, 14)

Additional personnel

- Bob Casale – additional guitar (5–6, 11, 13–15)
- Alan Myers – drums (5–6, 12–13, 15)

Technical

Credits adapted from liner notes of original Rykodisc 1991 issue:

- Devo – engineers, mixing
- Barbara Watson – photography
- Koepke Design Group – package design
- Bernie Grundman – mastering

Credits adapted from Devo: The Brand (2018):

- Devo – photo concept, art direction
- Moshe Brakha – photography

== See also ==
- Hardcore Devo: Volume Two
