= Devo =

American new wave band

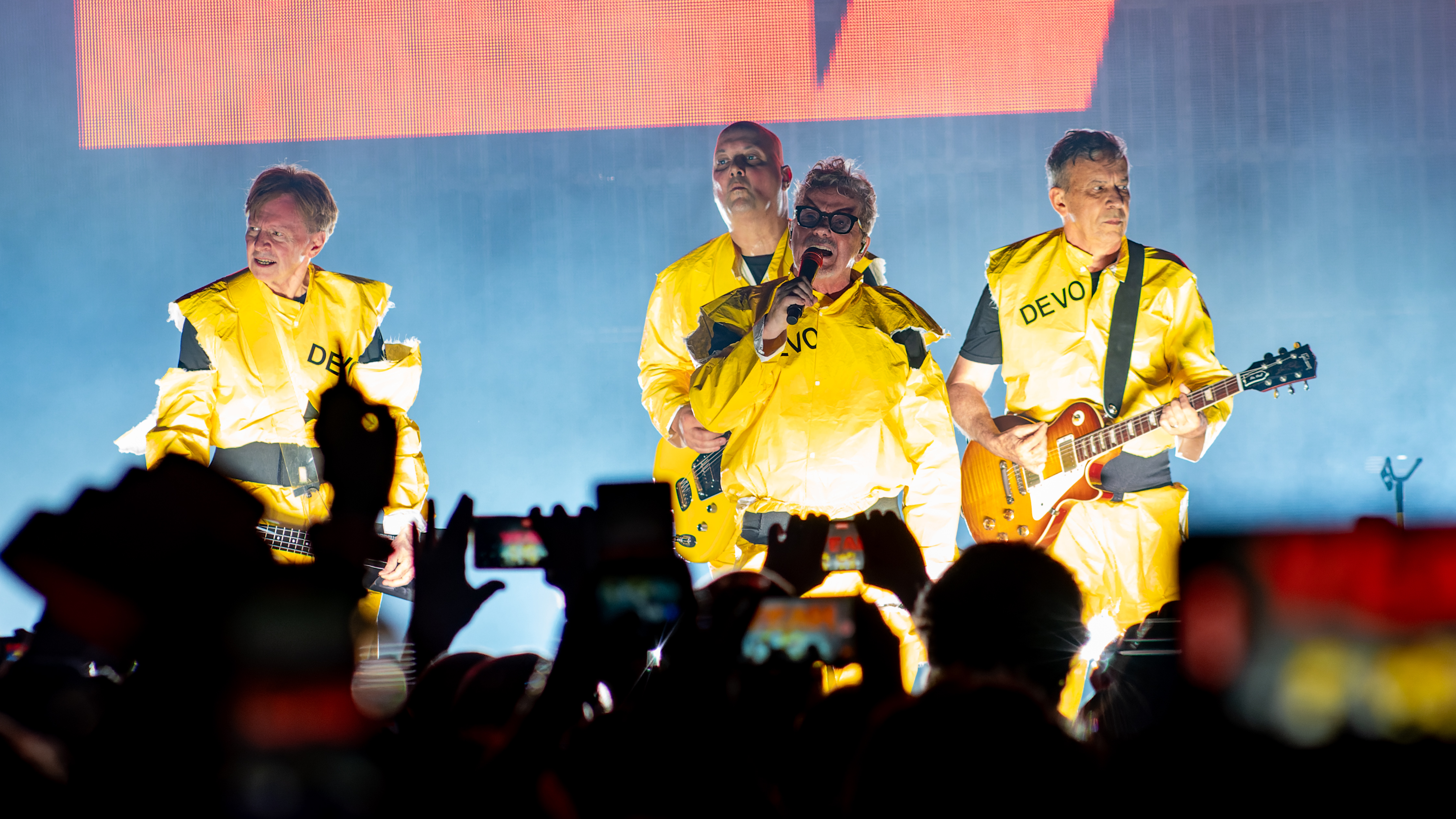
- Devo performing live at the Eventim Apollo, in Hammersmith, London, England, 2023; Left to right: Gerald Casale (vocals; bass), Josh Hager (guitar; keyboards), Mark Mothersbaugh (vocals; keyboards), and Bob Mothersbaugh (guitar)

Background information
- Also known as: DEV-O; Dove; The De-Evolution Band
- Origin: Akron, Ohio, U.S.
- Genres: New wave; synth-pop; post-punk; art rock
- Works: Discography
- Years active: 1973–1991; 1996–present
- Labels: Warner Bros.; Virgin; Enigma; Rykodisc; Stiff; Restless
- Spinoffs: Visiting Kids; The Wipeouters; Devo 2.0; Jihad Jerry & the Evildoers
- Spinoff of: Flossy Bobbitt; The Numbers Band; The Mothersbaugh Band
- Members: Gerald Casale; Mark Mothersbaugh; Bob Mothersbaugh; Josh Hager; Jeff Friedl
- Past members: Bob Lewis; Bob Casale; Rod Reisman; Fred Weber; Jim Mothersbaugh; Alan Myers; David Kendrick; Josh Freese
- Website: clubdevo.com

Devo (Note: /ˈdiːvoʊ/, originally /diːˈvoʊ/; often stylized as DEVO) is an American new wave band from Akron, Ohio, formed in 1973. Their classic line-up consisted of two sets of brothers, the Mothersbaughs (vocalist Mark and lead guitarist Bob) and the Casales (bassist Gerald and rhythm guitarist Bob), along with drummer Alan Myers. While the band is best known for their 1980 single "Whip It," their only top 40 hit on the Billboard Hot 100, they continue to have a loyal following.

Devo's music and visual presentation (including stage shows and costumes) mingle kitsch science fiction themes, deadpan surrealist humor and mordantly satirical social commentary. The band's namesake, the tongue-in-cheek social theory of "de-evolution", was an integral concept in their early work, which was marked by experimental and dissonant art punk that merged rock music with electronics. Their output in the 1980s embraced synth-pop and a more mainstream, less conceptual style, though the band's satirical and quirky humor remained intact. Their music has proven influential on subsequent movements, particularly on new wave, industrial, and alternative rock artists, as well as an internet microgenre originally known as "devo-core". Devo (most enthusiastically Gerald Casale) was also a pioneer of the music video format.

== History ==
=== 1973–1978: Formation ===
The name Devo comes from the concept of "de-evolution" and the band's related idea that instead of continuing to evolve, mankind had begun to regress, as evidenced by the dysfunction and herd mentality of American society. In the late 1960s, this idea was developed as a joke by Kent State University art students Gerald Casale and Bob Lewis, who created a number of satirical art pieces in a devolution vein. At this time, Casale had also performed with the local band 15-60-75 (The Numbers Band). They met Mark Mothersbaugh around 1970, a talented keyboardist who had been playing with the band Flossy Bobbitt. Mothersbaugh brought a more humorous feel to the band, introducing them to material like the pamphlet "Jocko Homo Heavenbound", which includes an illustration of a winged devil labelled "D-EVOLUTION" and would later inspire the song "Jocko Homo". The "joke" about de-evolution became serious following the Kent State massacre of May 4, 1970. This event would be cited multiple times as the impetus for forming the band Devo. Throughout the band's career, they have often been considered a "joke band" by the music press.

The first form of Devo was the "Sextet Devo" which performed at the 1973 Kent State performing arts festival. It included Casale, Lewis and Mothersbaugh, as well as Gerald's brother Bob Casale on guitar, and friends Rod Reisman and Fred Weber on drums and vocals, respectively. This performance was filmed and an excerpt was later included on the home video release The Complete Truth About De-Evolution. This lineup performed only once. Devo returned to perform in the Student Governance Center (featured prominently in the film) at the 1974 Creative Arts Festival with a lineup including the Casale brothers, Bob Lewis, Mark Mothersbaugh, and Jim Mothersbaugh on drums.

The band continued to perform, generally as a quartet, but with a fluid lineup including Mark's brothers Bob Mothersbaugh and Jim Mothersbaugh. Bob played electric guitar, and Jim provided percussion using a set of home-made electronic drums. Their first two music videos, "Secret Agent Man" and "Jocko Homo", which both appeared in The Truth About De-Evolution, were filmed in Akron, and Cuyahoga Falls, Ohio, the hometown of most members. This lineup of Devo lasted until late 1975 when Jim left the band. Lewis would sometimes play guitar during this period, but mainly stayed in a managerial role. In concert, Devo would often perform in the guise of theatrical characters, such as Booji Boy and the Chinaman. A recording of an early Devo performance from 1975 with the quartet lineup appears on Devo Live: The Mongoloid Years (1992), ending with the promoters unplugging Devo's equipment.

Following Jim Mothersbaugh's departure, Bob Mothersbaugh found a new drummer, Alan Myers, who played on a conventional, acoustic drum kit. Casale re-recruited his brother Bob Casale, and the lineup of Devo remained the same for nearly ten years.

Devo gained some fame in 1976 when their short film The Truth About De-Evolution, directed by Chuck Statler, won a prize at the Ann Arbor Film Festival. This attracted the attention of David Bowie, who began work to get the band a recording contract with Warner Music Group. In 1977, Devo were asked by Neil Young to participate in the making of his film Human Highway. Released in 1982, the film featured the band as "nuclear garbagemen". The band members were asked to write their own parts and Mark Mothersbaugh scored and recorded much of the soundtrack, his first of many.

In March 1977, Devo released their first single, "Mongoloid" backed with "Jocko Homo", the B-side of which came from the soundtrack to The Truth About De-Evolution, on their independent label Booji Boy. This was followed by a cover of the Rolling Stones' "(I Can't Get No) Satisfaction".

In 1978, the B Stiff EP was released by British independent label Stiff, which included the single "Be Stiff" plus two previous Booji Boy releases. "Mechanical Man", a 4-track 7-inch extended play (EP) of demos, an apparent bootleg, but actually put out by the band, was also released that year.

=== 1978–1980: Recording contract, Q: Are We Not Men? A: We Are Devo!, and Duty Now for the Future ===
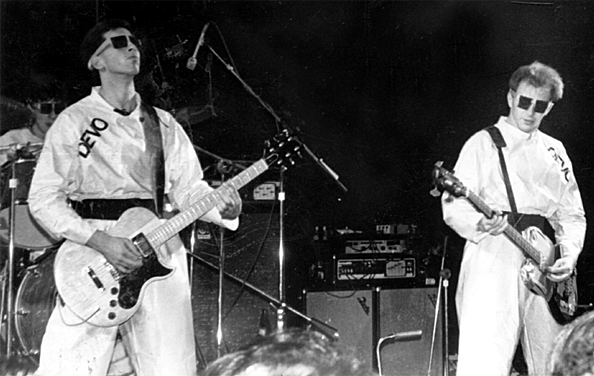
Live performance in Atlanta, Georgia, 1978: Bob Casale and Gerald Casale

Recommendations from David Bowie and Iggy Pop enabled Devo to secure a recording contract with Warner Bros. in 1978. After Bowie backed out of the business deal due to previous commitments, their first album, Q: Are We Not Men? A: We Are Devo!, was produced by Brian Eno and featured rerecordings of their previous singles "Mongoloid" and "(I Can't Get No) Satisfaction". On October 14, 1978, Devo gained national exposure with an appearance on the late-night show Saturday Night Live, a week after the Rolling Stones, performing "(I Can't Get No) Satisfaction" and "Jocko Homo".

The band followed up with Duty Now for the Future in 1979, which moved the band more towards electronic instrumentation. While not as successful as their first album, it did produce some fan favorites with the songs "Blockhead" and "The Day My Baby Gave Me a Surprize" [sic], as well as a cover of the Johnny Rivers hit "Secret Agent Man". "Secret Agent Man" had been recorded first in 1974 for Devo's first film and performed live as early as 1976. In 1979, Devo traveled to Japan for the first time, and a live show from this tour was partially recorded. Devo appeared on Don Kirshner's Rock Concert in 1979, performing "Blockhead", "Secret Agent Man", "Uncontrollable Urge", and "Mongoloid". Also in 1979, Rhino, in conjunction with the Los Angeles radio station KROQ-FM, released Devotees, a tribute album. It contained a set of covers of Devo songs interspersed with renditions of popular songs in Devo's style.

Devo actively embraced the parody religion Church of the SubGenius. In concert, Devo sometimes performed as their own opening act, pretending to be a Christian soft rock band called "Dove (the Band of Love)", which is an anagram of "Devo". They appeared as Dove in the 1980 televangelism spoof film Pray TV.

=== 1980–1982: Mainstream breakthrough, Freedom of Choice, and New Traditionalists ===
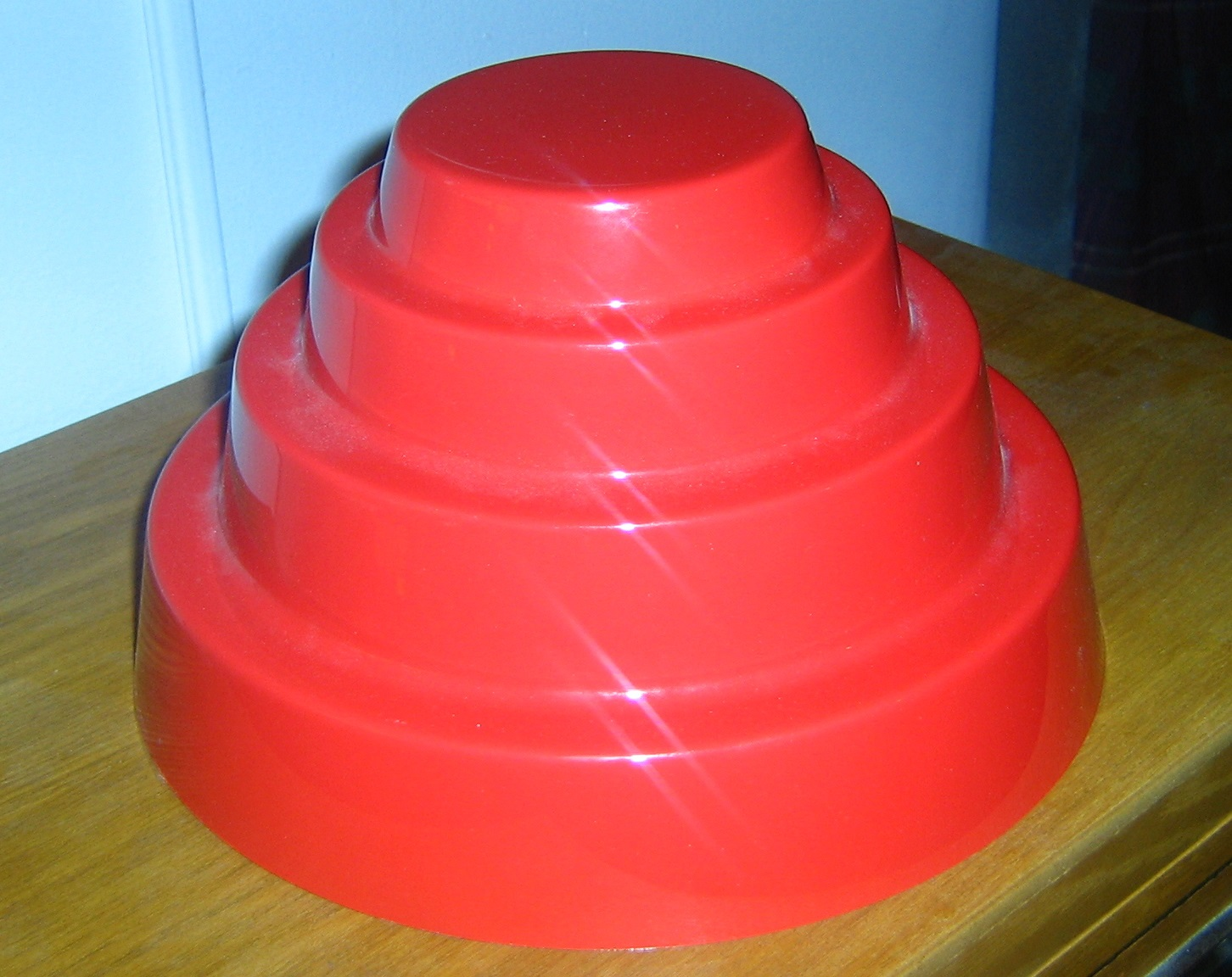
Energy domes became a staple of Devo's fashion after Freedom of Choice.

Devo gained a new level of visibility with 1980's Freedom of Choice. This album included their best-known hit, "Whip It", which quickly became a Top 40 hit. The album moved to an almost completely electronic sound, with the exception of acoustic drums and Bob Mothersbaugh's guitar. The tour for Freedom of Choice was ambitious for the band, including dates in Japan, the United Kingdom, France, Germany, Italy, the Netherlands, and Canada. The band used a minimalist set including large custom light boxes which could be laid on their back to form a second, smaller stage during the second half of the set. Other popular songs from Freedom of Choice were "Girl U Want", the title-track, and "Gates of Steel". The band released popular music videos for "Whip It" and "Girl U Want". Devo made three appearances on the TV show Fridays in 1980 and 1981, as well as on Don Kirshner's Rock Concert, American Bandstand, and other shows. The band members often wore red, terraced energy dome hats as part of its stage outfit. The dome was first worn during the band's Freedom of Choice campaign of 1980. It reappeared in the 1981, 1982, and 1988 tours, as well as in most of their performances since 1997. Devo also recorded two albums of their own songs as elevator music for their fan club, Club Devo, released on cassette in 1981 and 1984. These were later re-released on the album E-Z Listening Disc (1987), with all but two of the original Club Devo songs. These songs were often played as house music before Devo concerts.

In August 1981, the band's DEV-O Live EP spent three weeks at the top of the Australian charts. In 1982, they toured Australia and appeared on the TV show Countdown. Devo enjoyed continued popularity in Australia, where the nationally broadcast 1970s–1980s pop TV show Countdown was one of the first programs in the world to broadcast their video clips. They were given consistent radio support by Sydney-based non-commercial rock station Double Jay (2JJ) and Brisbane-based independent community station Triple Zed (4ZZZ), two of the first rock stations outside America to play their recordings. The late-night music program Nightmoves aired The Truth About De-Evolution.

In 1981, Devo contributed a cover of "Working in the Coal Mine", recorded during the Freedom of Choice sessions, to the film Heavy Metal. They offered the song to be used in the film when Warner Bros. refused to include it on the album. Warner then included it as an independent bonus single accompanying their 1981 release, New Traditionalists. For this album Devo wore self-described "Utopian Boy Scout uniforms" topped with a "New Traditionalist Pomp"—a plastic half-wig modeled on the hairstyle of John F. Kennedy. Among the singles from the album was "Through Being Cool", written as a reaction to their new-found fame from "Whip It" and seen as a response to new fans who had misinterpreted the message behind the hit song. The album's accompanying tour featured the band performing an intensely physical show with treadmills and a large Greek temple set. That same year they served as Toni Basil's backing band on Word of Mouth, her debut album, which included versions of three Devo songs, recorded with Basil singing lead.

=== 1982–1987: Oh, No! It's Devo, Shout, and Myers' departure ===
Oh, No! It's Devo followed in 1982. Produced by Roy Thomas Baker, the album featured a more synth-pop-oriented sound than its predecessors. According to Gerald Casale, the album's sound was inspired by reviewers alternately describing them as both "fascists" and "clowns". The album's tour featured the band performing seven songs in front of a 12-foot high rear-projection screen with synchronized video, an image recreated using blue screen effects in the album's accompanying music videos. Devo also contributed two songs, "Theme from Doctor Detroit" and "Luv-Luv", to the 1983 Dan Aykroyd film Doctor Detroit, and produced a music video for "Theme from Doctor Detroit" featuring clips from the film interspersed with live-action segments.

The band's sixth studio album, Shout (1984), which featured extensive use of the Fairlight CMI digital sampling synthesizer, was received poorly, and the expensive music video they'd produced for their cover of the Jimi Hendrix Experience's "Are You Experienced?" was criticized by some as being "disrespectful", all of which caused Warner Bros. to buy out the remainder of Devo's contract. Shortly thereafter, Myers left the band, citing creative unfulfillment.

In the interim, Mark Mothersbaugh began composing music for the TV show Pee-wee's Playhouse and released an elaborately packaged solo cassette, Musik for Insomniaks, which was later expanded and released as two CDs in 1988.

=== 1987–1991: Total Devo, Smooth Noodle Maps, and breakup ===
In 1987, Devo re-formed with former Sparks drummer David Kendrick to replace Myers. Their first project was a soundtrack for the horror film Slaughterhouse Rock (1988), starring Toni Basil. The band released the album Total Devo in 1988, on Enigma Records. This album included two songs used in the Slaughterhouse Rock soundtrack. The song "Baby Doll" was used that same year in the comedy film Tapeheads, with newly recorded Swedish lyrics, and was credited to (and shown in a music video by) a fictitious Swedish band called Cube-Squared. Devo followed this up with a world tour, and released the live album Now It Can Be Told: Devo at the Palace in 1989. However, Total Devo was not a commercial success and received poor critical reviews.

In 1989, members of Devo were involved in the project Visiting Kids, releasing a self-titled EP on the New Rose label in 1990. The band featured Mark's then-wife Nancye Ferguson, as well as David Kendrick, Bob Mothersbaugh, and Bob's daughter Alex Mothersbaugh. Their record was produced by Bob Casale and Mark Mothersbaugh, and Mark also co-wrote some of the songs. Visiting Kids appeared on the soundtrack to the film Rockula, as well as on Late Night with David Letterman. A promotional video was filmed for the song "Trilobites".

In 1990, Smooth Noodle Maps, Devo's last album for twenty years, was released. It too was a critical and commercial failure which, along with its two singles "Stuck in a Loop" and "Post Post-Modern Man", were Devo's worst-selling efforts; all failed to appear on the U.S. charts. Devo launched a concert tour in support of the album, but poor ticket sales and the bankruptcy and dissolution of Enigma Records, which was responsible for organizing and financing the tour, caused it to be cancelled part way through.

In 1990, the members of Devo, bar Bob Mothersbaugh, appeared in the film The Spirit of '76. Two albums of demo recordings from 1974 to 1977, namely Hardcore Devo: Volume One (1990) and Hardcore Devo: Volume Two (1991), were released on Rykodisc, as well as an album of early live recordings, Devo Live: The Mongoloid Years (1992).

The band played one final show in March 1991 before breaking up. In an interview with Mark Mothersbaugh concerning their 1996 computer game Devo Presents Adventures of the Smart Patrol, he explained, "Around '88, '89, '90 maybe, we did our last tour in Europe, and it was kind of at that point, We were watching This Is Spinal Tap on the bus and said, 'Oh my God, that's our life.' And we just said, 'Things have to change.' So we kind of agreed from there that we wouldn't do live shows anymore."

=== 1991–1996: Hiatus ===
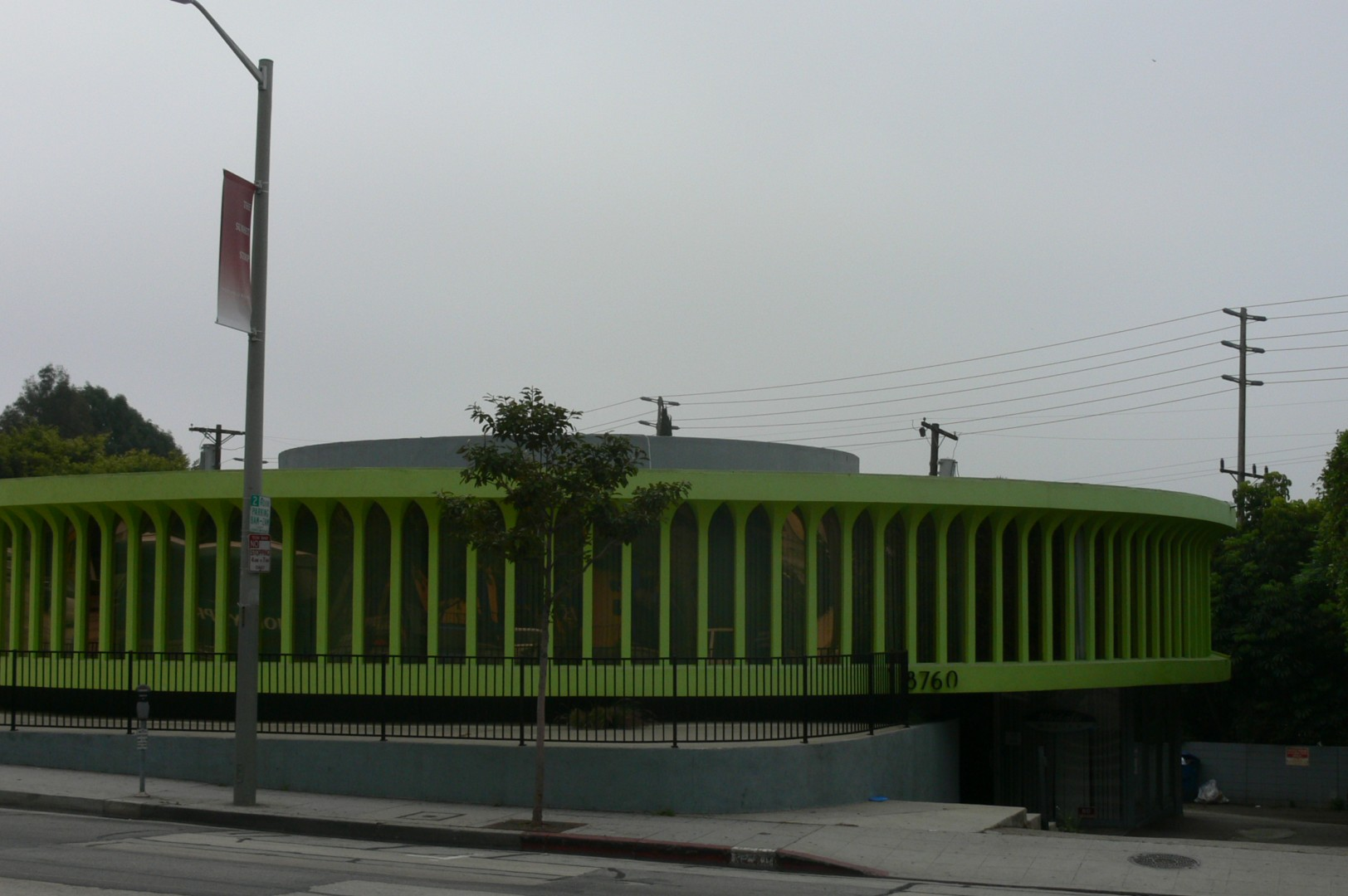
Mutato Muzika building on Sunset Boulevard in Los Angeles, California.

Following the split, Mark Mothersbaugh established Mutato Muzika, a commercial music production studio, along with Bob Mothersbaugh and Bob Casale. Mothersbaugh meant to further a career as a composer, and the latter worked as an audio engineer. Mothersbaugh has had considerable success writing and producing music for television programs, including Pee-wee's Playhouse and Rugrats, video games, cartoons, and films, where he worked alongside director Wes Anderson. David Kendrick also worked at Mutato for a period during the early 1990s. Gerald Casale began a career as a director of music videos and commercials, working with bands including Rush, Soundgarden, Silverchair and the Foo Fighters. In the wake of Devo's dissolution, Bob Mothersbaugh attempted to start a solo career with The Bob I Band, recording an album that was never released. The tapes for this are now lost, though a bootleg recording of the band in concert exists and can be obtained through the bootleg aggregator Booji Boy's Basement.

While they did not release any studio albums during this period, Devo sporadically reconvened to record a number of songs for various films and compilations, including a new recording of "Girl U Want" on the soundtrack to the 1995 film Tank Girl and a cover of the Nine Inch Nails hit "Head Like a Hole" for the 1996 North American version of the film Supercop.

=== 1996–2007: Reunion ===
In January 1996, Devo performed a reunion concert at the Sundance Film Festival in Park City, Utah. The band performed on part of the 1996 Lollapalooza tour in the rotating Mystery Spot. On these tours and most subsequent tours, Devo performed a set-list mostly composed of material from between 1978 and 1982, ignoring their Enigma Records-era material. Also in 1996, Devo released a multimedia CD-ROM adventure game, Adventures of the Smart Patrol with Inscape. The game was not a success, but the Lollapalooza tour was received well enough to allow Devo to return in 1997 as a headliner. Devo performed sporadically from 1997 onwards.

In 1999, the Oh, No! It's Devo era outtakes "Faster and Faster" and "One Dumb Thing", as well as the Shout era outtake "Modern Life", were restored, completed and used in the video game Interstate '82, developed by Activision and released. Also that year, Mothersbaugh started the Devo side-project The Wipeouters, after their band in junior high, featuring himself (keyboards, organ), Bob Mothersbaugh (guitar), Bob Casale (guitar), and Mutato Muzika composer Josh Mancell (drums). The Wipeouters performed the theme song to the Nickelodeon animated series Rocket Power, and in 2001 they released an album of surf rock material, titled P'Twaaang!!!.

By 2000, Devo's online fandom continued to grow, leading to 'DEVOtional', a Devo fan convention held annually in Cleveland, Ohio. The festival was most recently held in September 2024.

In 2005, Devo recorded a new version of "Whip It" to be used in Swiffer television commercials, a decision they have said they regretted. During an interview with the Dallas Observer, Gerald Casale said, "It's just aesthetically offensive. It's got everything a commercial that turns people off has." The song "Beautiful World" was also used in a re-recorded form for an advertisement for Target stores. Due to rights issues with their back catalog, Devo has re-recorded songs for films and advertisements.

In 2005, Gerald Casale announced his "solo" project, Jihad Jerry & the Evildoers (the Evildoers, including the other members of Devo), and released the first EP, Army Girls Gone Wild in 2006. A full-length album, Mine Is Not a Holy War, was released on September 12, 2006, after a several-month delay. It featured mostly new material, plus re-recordings of four obscure Devo songs: "I Need a Chick" and "I Been Refused" (from Hardcore Devo: Volume Two), "Find Out" (which appeared on the single and EP of "Peek-a-Boo!" in 1982), and "Beehive" (which was recorded by the band in 1974, whereupon it was apparently abandoned, with the exception of one appearance at a special show in 2001). Devo continued to tour actively in 2005 and 2006, unveiling a new stage show at appearances in October 2006, with the Jihad Jerry character performing "Beautiful World" as an encore.

Also in 2006, Devo worked on a project with Disney known as Devo 2.0. A band of child performers was assembled and re-recorded Devo songs. A quote from the Akron Beacon Journal stated, "Devo recently finished a new project in cahoots with Disney called Devo 2.0, which features the band playing old songs and two new ones with vocals provided by children. Their debut album, a two disc CD/DVD combo entitled DEV2.0, was released on March 14, 2006. The lyrics of some of the songs were changed for family-friendly airplay, which has been claimed by the band to be a play on irony of the messages of their classic hits."

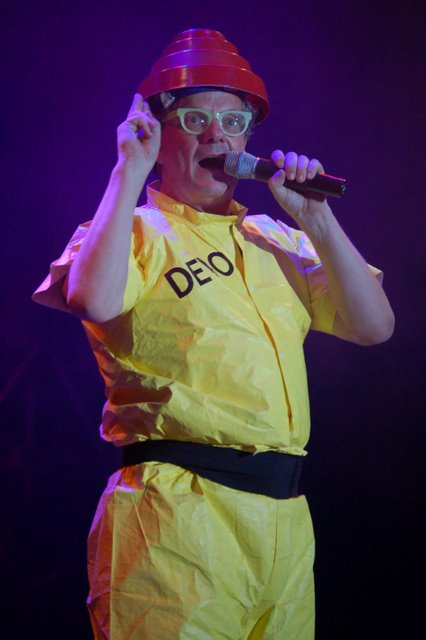
Mark Mothersbaugh performing live with Devo at the Festival Internacional de Benicàssim, 2007 (Gerald Casale vacuum forms thermoplastic using an Art Deco lamp as a mold, with a hat liner, to make the "energy" helmets)

In an April 2007 interview, Gerald Casale mentioned a tentative project for a biographical film about Devo's early days. According to Casale, a script was supposedly in development, called The Beginning Was the End. Devo played their first European tour since 1990 in the summer of 2007, including a performance at Festival Internacional de Benicàssim (FIB).

=== 2007–2013: Something for Everybody ===
In December 2007, Devo released their first new single since 1990, "Watch Us Work It", which was featured in a commercial for Dell. The song features a sampled drum track from the New Traditionalists song "The Super Thing". Casale said that the song was chosen from a batch that the band was working on, and that it was the closest the band had been to releasing a new album.

Devo performed at the South by Southwest (SXSW) festival in March 2009, unveiling a new stage show with synchronized video backdrops (similar to the 1982 tour), new costumes, and three new songs: "Don't Shoot, I'm a Man!", "What We Do", and "Fresh". On September 16, Warner Bros. and Devo announced rereleases of Q: Are We Not Men? A: We Are Devo! and Freedom of Choice, as well as a subsequent tour, where they would perform both albums in their entirety.

A new album, Something for Everybody, was eventually released on June 15, 2010, preceded by a 12-inch single of "Fresh"/"What We Do" on June 10. Devo was awarded the first Moog Innovator Award on October 29, during Moogfest 2010 in Asheville, North Carolina. The Moog Innovator Award has been said to celebrate "pioneering artists whose genre-defying work exemplifies the bold, innovative spirit of Bob Moog". Devo was scheduled to perform at Moogfest, but Bob Mothersbaugh severely injured his hand three days prior, and the band was forced to cancel. Mark Mothersbaugh and Gerald Casale collaborated with Austin-based band the Octopus Project to perform "Girl U Want" and "Beautiful World" at the event instead.

The band split from Warner Bros in 2012 and launched a new "post-Warner Brothers" website that would offer "new protective gear" and "unreleased material from the archives in vinyl disc format". In August of that year, the band released a single called "Don't Roof Rack Me, Bro (Seamus Unleashed)", dedicated to the Republican Party presidential candidate Mitt Romney's former pet dog Seamus. The title refers to the Mitt Romney dog incident of 1983, when Romney travelled twelve hours with the dog in a crate on his car's roof rack.

On June 24, 2013, the group's former drummer Alan Myers died of stomach cancer in Los Angeles, California. He was 58. News reports at the time of his death incorrectly cited brain cancer as the cause. One month later, Devo released their Something Else for Everybody album, which collected "Unreleased Demos and Focus Group Rejects" from 2006 to 2009. Gerald Casale had earlier teased the album in a 2012 interview with Billboard magazine.

=== 2014–2016: Hardcore Devo Tour and deaths ===
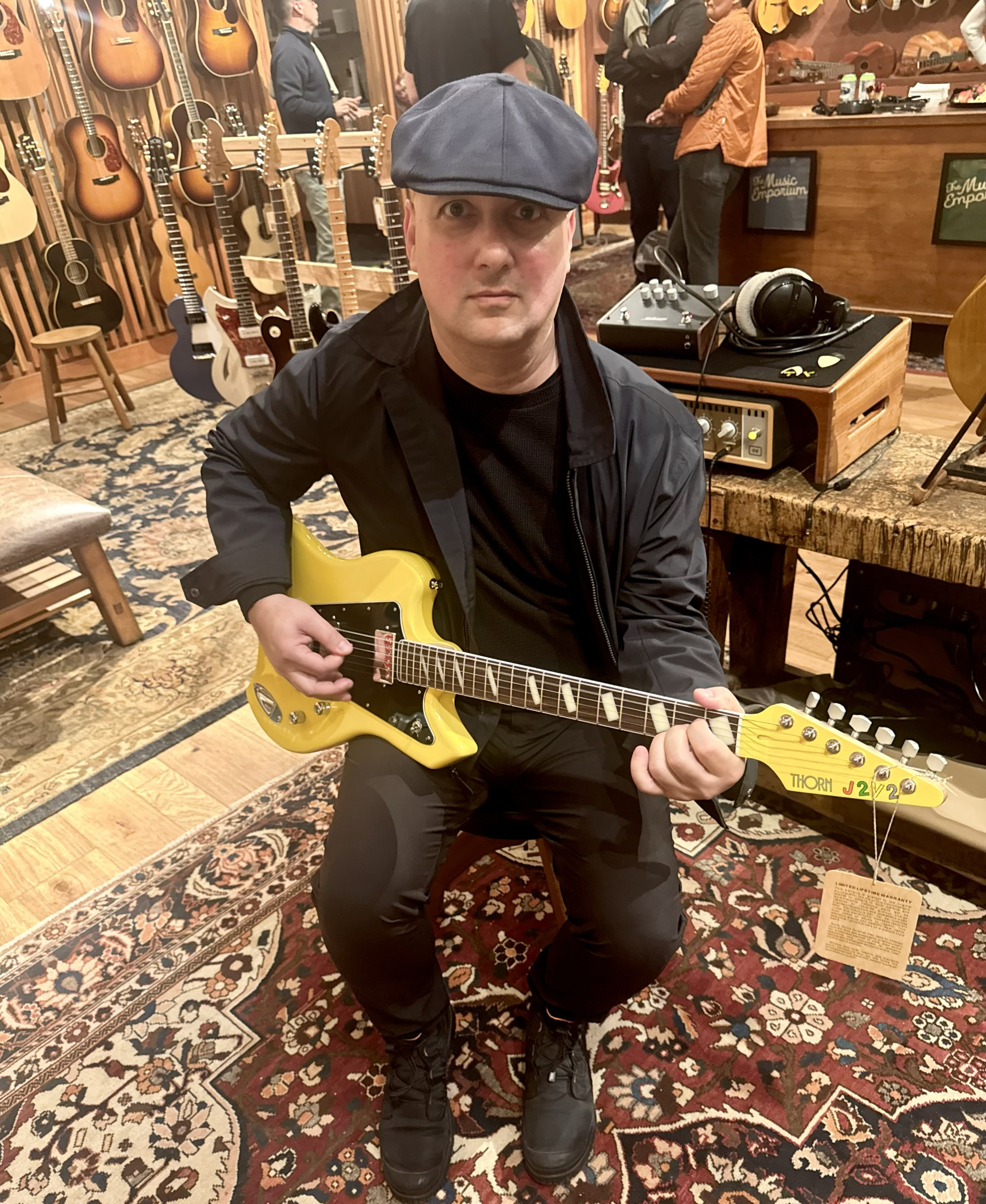
Josh Hager became Devo's rhythm guitarist after Bob Casale's death.

On February 17, 2014, founding member Bob Casale died of heart failure at age 61. Shortly afterwards, the group, a quartet for the first time in 38 years, embarked on their Hardcore Devo Tour, a ten-show tour across the US and Canada between June 18 and July 2, 2014. The tour focused on material the group had written before the release of their first album, which was largely written when the group were a quartet. Partial proceeds for the ten shows went to support Bob Casale's family after his sudden death. The show featured the group performing material written during 1974–1977. The June 28 Oakland show was filmed and later released as the concert film Hardcore Devo Live!, released on Blu-ray, DVD, and Video on Demand on February 10, 2015, accompanied by CD and double-vinyl audio releases.

Immediately following from the Hardcore tour, Devo continued to tour a 'greatest hits' style show. Josh Hager joined the band at this time, playing guitar and keyboards. On April 29, 2016, Devo performed at Will Ferrell and Chad Smith's Red Hot Benefit. On May 22, Robert Mothersbaugh Sr., father of Mark, Bob, and Jim Mothersbaugh, died. Robert had portrayed General Boy in various Devo films.

=== 2017–present: Current activities ===
In 2017, the official Twitter account for the Are We Not Men? documentary film, which had been in production since 2009, stated that "the film was finished years ago" and that "mm [Mark Mothersbaugh] is blocking its release". Jeff Winner, who was consulting producer for the Devo documentary, went on to state that he and director Tony Pemberton had "delivered the film that was contracted, and on schedule. It's now in the hands of the band to decide when/how it's released/distributed."

Devo headlined the Burger Boogaloo festival in Oakland, California, on June 30, 2018, with comedian and former Trenchmouth drummer Fred Armisen on drums. On October 12, 2020, Devo performed at the Desert Daze festival, with Jeff Friedl on drums.

On October 24, 2021, John Hinckley Jr posted on Twitter that he had not received any royalties for Devo's song "I Desire" in 35 years. "I Desire" had been written by Mark Mothersbaugh and Gerald Casale for their 1982 album Oh, No! It's Devo, inspired by a poem written by Hinckley that was published in a tabloid newspaper, following his attempt to assassinate then-current president Ronald Reagan. Hinckley had been adequately credited for his contributions through a co-writing credit on all releases. Casale claimed that Devo were not at fault, as it was the publishing company's duty to pay him, not the band's.

Devotional 2021, an annual convention for Devo fans, was held on November 5–6, with the annual 5KDEVO race taking place on the 7. On November 15, it was announced that Devo would perform a one-off show at the Rooftop at Pier 17 on May 18, 2022, in order to make up for their cancelled Radio City Music Hall gig in September 2021.

In December, it was announced that rare images of Devo would feature in a book of rock photography from 1977 to 1980 titled HARD + FAST, to be released on February 1, 2022. The book will also include a 7-inch single of live recordings from the band, which were also released on SoundCloud prior to the book's release. The recordings were dated 1977, but the performances are identical to those found on an audience bootleg recorded on October 10, 1978.

On May 14 and 15, 2022, Devo performed at the Cruel World Festival at the Rose Bowl's Brookside golf course in Pasadena, California, followed three days later by their performance at The Rooftop at Pier 17.

In a February 20, 2023, article by the Akron Beacon Journal promoting the film Cocaine Bear, Mothersbaugh announced that the group would celebrate the year as their 50th anniversary, and that he had plans for Devo to remain active for 50 more years. He also stated that he, Gerald Casale and Bob Mothersbaugh were all interested in touring. This was followed by the announcement of a European tour, taking place between August 8th and 19th of 2023, with shows at London's Eventim Apollo, Øyafestivalen in Norway, Way Out West festival in Sweden, Flow Festival in Finland, Green Man Festival in Wales, and Luna Fest in Portugal. This was followed in November and December by a string of shows in the US and Australia.

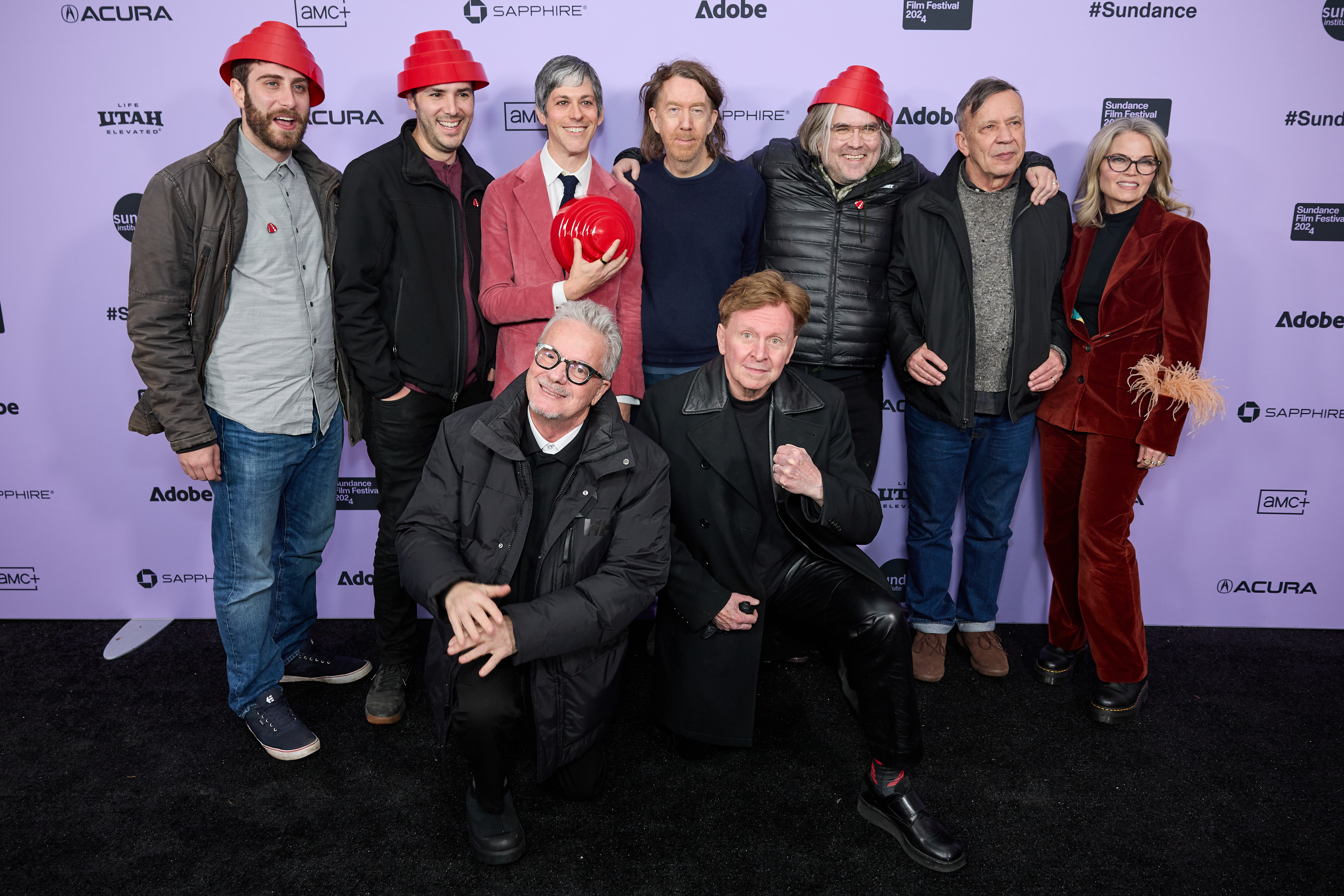
Mark Mothersbaugh (centre left), Gerald Casale (centre right) and Bob Mothersbaugh (second to the right) at the premiere of the documentary about the band at the 2024 Sundance Film Festival

On January 21, 2024, Devo, a Chris Smith directed documentary on the band premiered at Sundance Film Festival, with the group performing at the event. The film was produced and financed by BMG, Fremantle Documentaries, and Warner Music Entertainment, and according to a statement by the band "explores Devo's evolution from hippie artistes to art-rockers with a message, to their unexpected mainstream success as a hit rock band and the pioneers of the MTV age," following the group's career arc up to its status as "elder statesmen". Smith was executive producer on Tiger King, which had been scored by Mark Mothersbaugh, with Bob Mothersbaugh co-scoring its first season.

Between May 4 and 26, Devo underwent another short United States tour, including a show at the Andy Warhol Museum and at this same time, Mothersbaugh released an art book titled Apotropaic Beatnik Graffiti. On June 5, 2024, a collaboration between David Byrne and Devo was released. The recording was an early version of Byrne's song "Empire", recorded during the sessions for his 1997 Feelings album, seven years before the song appeared on his Grown Backwards album.

On February 14, 2025, Devo appeared on Saturday Night Live's SNL50: The Homecoming Concert special, performing "Uncontrollable Urge" with Fred Armisen again serving as drummer. In late 2025, they co-headlined with the B-52s on the "Cosmic De-Evolution" tour, with Lene Lovich as the opening act.

In April 2026, Devo launched their "Mutate Don't Stagnate" tour with performances scheduled at venues in North America and the United Kingdom.

== Musical style ==
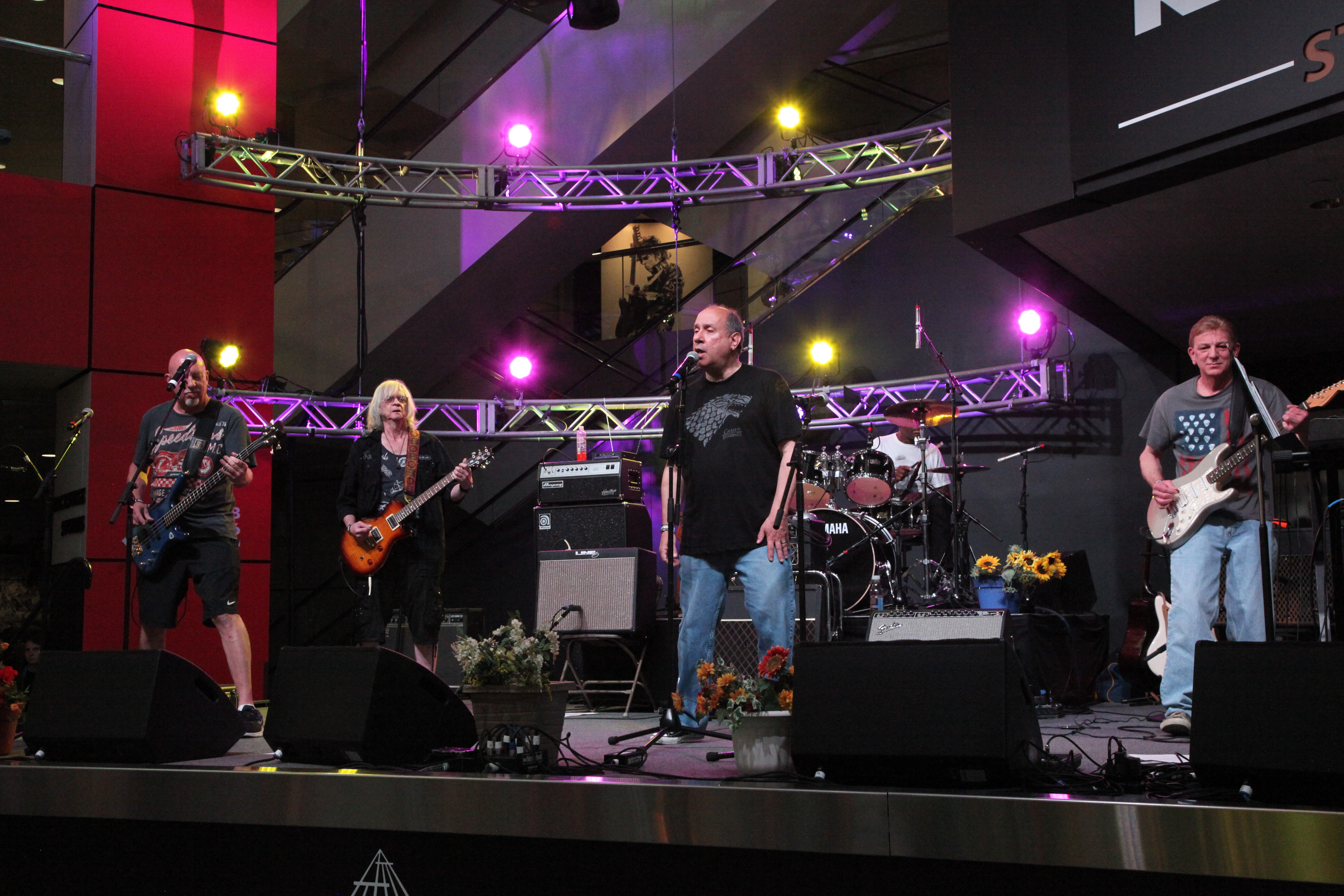
The Bizarros are among the bands who emerged from the Akron Sound in Devo's wake.

Devo are pioneers of new wave, specifically the Akron Sound, which birthed bands like Tin Huey and the Waitresses. They are also among the only groups to span proto-punk, punk rock and post-punk, being influenced by the Ramones to speed up their dissonant art rock sound. As such, the band has also been described as art punk, and because of their fusion of rock with electronics, electronic rock and synth-punk. Despite this, and their sampling of unorthodox sounds like toys, space heaters, toasters, and other objects being influential to industrial, most of Devo's music in the 1970s was guitar-driven. However, they began toning down their punk attitude in favor of hookier art pop by their second album, Duty Now For The Future, as their fanbase and knowledge of synthesizers grew.

By the early 1980s, Devo underwent a musical transformation. Gerald Casale's and Bob Mothersbaugh's mutual love of R&B and pressure from Warner Bros. encouraged the band to developer a funkier, synth-pop sound on their third album, Freedom of Choice. They are among the first artists to find success in the genre, alongside the Buggles, Gary Numan and M. Their fourth album, New Traditionalists, recalled their darker and more minimalist post-punk tendencies, while continuing to delve deeper into electronic. Otherwise, they tried keeping up with the dance-pop they inspired until disbanding in 1991.

While the band later returned to a more rock-oriented sound, critics still struggle to describe their overall sound. Some consider them progenitors of geek rock, however this is more due to their aesthetic than sound. Others have labeled them as "zolo," a retrospective term coined in 1989 by college radio DJ Terry Sharkie for artists with "angular guitars, funk bass and schnozzy talk singing," though many doubt whether it counts as a genre. Trent Reznor of Nine Inch Nails concluded that "Devo challenged the idea of what a rock band could be. It felt like rock was mutating."

== Legacy ==
Devo has sold almost 2 million records worldwide, with the gold-certified Q: Are We Not Men? A: We Are Devo! and platinum-certified Freedom of Choice accounting for most of this total. Despite the modest sales, many of the band's early work have been ranked among the best in their genres, with both albums in particular being included on "best of" lists from publications including Rolling Stone, Pitchfork, and Spin. The band was nominated for induction into the Rock and Roll Hall of Fame in 2018, 2021 and 2022, with John Patrick Gatta of Ultimate Classic Rock arguing them having one of the best debut albums, being equally an art project and a band, being sincere about de-evolution, managing to find mainstream success and having a huge influence were reasons they should be inducted.

Corey Irwin, also of Ultimate Classic Rock, included Devo on his "5 New Wave Bands That Belong in the Rock and Roll Hall of Fame" list and at number 13 on his "20 Greatest New Wave Bands" ranking, touting them as "rock's favorite weirdos" on the latter. Jeff Terich of Treble called the band "legends," and included their song "Gut Feeling/Slap Your Mammy" on his 90-minute guide to new wave. The magazine also included hit single "Whip It" on their list of 50 essential synth-pop songs, writing that it "maybe accidentally defined" the genre for an entire generation.

David Bowie introduced the band onstage at New York City venue Max's Kansas City in 1977, calling them the "band of the future." He even planned to produce Q: Are We Not Men? A: We Are Devo! but could not commit, so Brian Eno filled his role. While he and the band had creative differences, they still respected each other's talents. Other celebrity fans of the band include Debbie Harry, Iggy Pop, Jack Nicholson, Leonard Cohen and Neil Young, who even featured them in his 1982 comedy film, Human Highway, as nuclear garbage men.

=== Influence ===
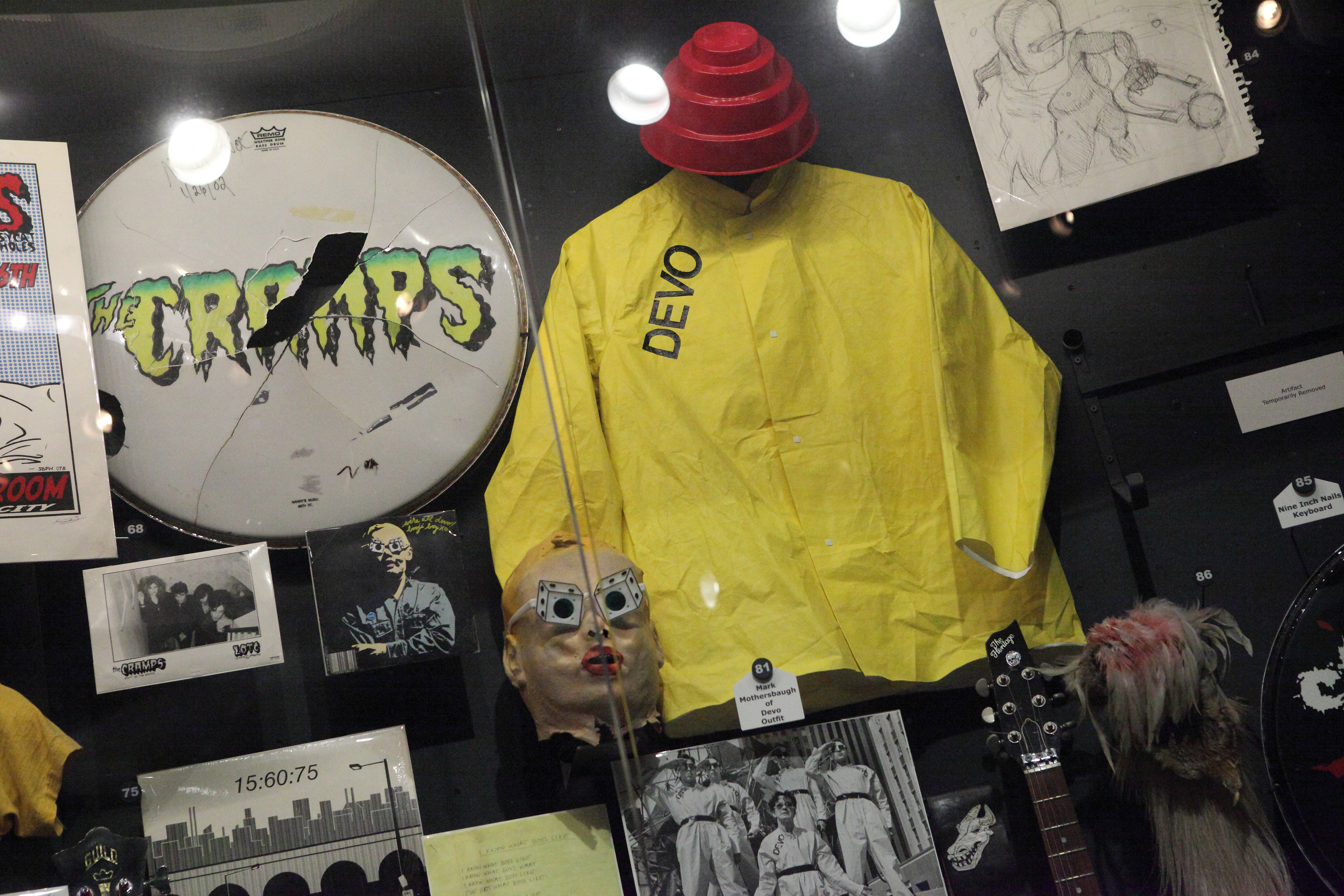
Artifacts from Devo at the Rock and Roll Hall of Fame in Cleveland, Ohio

The band is not only considered pioneers of new wave and punk rock, but alongside artists like Kraftwerk and Talking Heads, ushered in a new era of electronic music. On top of inspiring other artists within their genres, Devo was also a major influence on egg punk, an internet microgenre that was originally called devo-core, and electroclash, which Andy Gill of The Independent claimed they set the foundation for with their "mechanized swing" electropop. The band has influenced and/or been covered by artists such as Arcade Fire, Brainiac, Dave Grohl, Lady Gaga, LCD Soundsystem, Nine Inch Nails, Nirvana, Pearl Jam, Radiohead, Rage Against the Machine, Six Finger Satellite and Soundgarden.

In January 2021, Funko released two Devo Funko Pops inspired by the group's "Whip It" and "Satisfaction" music videos. One month later, the band starred in Devolution: A Devo Theory, a television documentary based entirely on their theory of devolution, which had been completed in 2020. In September, Devo performed a short three-date tour of the US, including a show at Riot Fest. These performances marked the return of Josh Freese on drums, who had not played live with Devo in over five years. Shortly afterwards, Gerald Casale announced the release of an official Devo potato-based vodka through the Trust Me Vodka brand. The packaging for the drink was themed around Devo imagery and featured original artwork. It was signed by the group's co-founders Gerald Casale and Mark Mothersbaugh, as well as Bob Mothersbaugh.

== Band members ==
Current

- Gerald Casale – lead and backing vocals, bass, keyboards (1973–1991, 1996–present)
- Mark Mothersbaugh – lead and backing vocals, keyboards, occasional guitar (1973–1991, 1996–present)
- Bob Mothersbaugh – lead guitar, backing and occasional lead vocals (1974–1991, 1996–present)
- Josh Hager – guitar, keyboards, backing vocals (2014–present)
- Jeff Friedl – drums (2023–present; touring 2008–2014, 2019 (Note: A Perfect Circle drummer Jeff Friedl (formerly of Eagles of Death Metal and Puscifer) performed with Devo on June 5, 2010, at the KROQ Weenie Roast in Los Angeles, and accompanied Devo on other selected dates between 2008 and 2013 due to Freese performing with Weezer. Friedl returned for several performances in late 2014 following the "Hardcore Devo" tour for similar reasons, and also played drums on a few tracks from the 2013 compilation album Something Else for Everybody.))

Former

- Bob Casale – rhythm guitar, keyboards, backing vocals (1973–1974, 1976–1991, 1996–2014; his death)
- Bob Lewis – lead guitar (1973–1974)
- Rod Reisman – drums (1973)
- Fred Weber – vocals (1973)
- Jim Mothersbaugh – drums (1974), electronic percussion (1974–1975)
- Alan Myers – drums (1976–1986; died 2013), electronic percussion (1982–1986)
- David Kendrick – drums (1987–1991, 1996–2004) (Note: David Kendrick performed with Devo at several 2002–2004 shows (including their tour of Japan (commemorated on the "Devo – Live in the Land of the Rising Sun" DVD) as well as the 2004 Nike Run Hit Wonder) due to the unavailability of Josh Freese. In addition, Kendrick also continued to play drums on all Devo studio tracks in the late 1990s and early 2000s. This would include "It's All Good", "Are You Ready", and "Go Monkey Go".) electronic percussion (1987–1991)
- Josh Freese – drums, percussion (1996–2023)

Touring

- Neil Taylor – drums (2008)
- Pete Parada – drums (2011)
- Brian Applegate – keyboards, bass guitar (2014)
- Alex Casale – bass guitar (2014)
- Ed Marshall – bass guitar (2014)
- Fred Armisen – drums (2018, 2025)

== Discography ==
Studio albums

- Q: Are We Not Men? A: We Are Devo! (1978)
- Duty Now for the Future (1979)
- Freedom of Choice (1980)
- New Traditionalists (1981)
- Oh, No! It's Devo (1982)
- Shout (1984)
- Total Devo (1988)
- Smooth Noodle Maps (1990)
- Something for Everybody (2010)
