= Bob Lewis (musician) =

American composer and musician (born 1947)

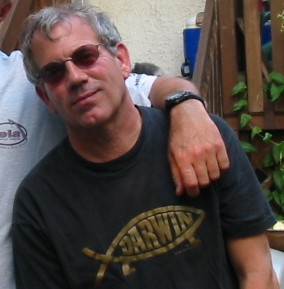
- Lewis in 2006
- Born: March 4, 1947 (age 79); Akron, Ohio, U.S.
- Other name: Hurricane Bob
- Occupations: Composer; musician; basketballer
- Musical career
- Genres: Art punk; electronic rock; proto-punk; new wave; synth-punk
- Instrument: Guitar

Robert Curtis Lewis (born March 4, 1947) is an American composer and musician. He is best known as a co-founder (along with Gerald Casale) of the new wave band Devo.

== Early years ==
Bob Lewis was born in Akron, Ohio, and played basketball briefly for Bobby Knight at Cuyahoga Falls High School. He was a National Merit Scholar and attended Kent State, where he was the first student to graduate with a major in anthropology. He graduated from Kent State University shortly after the Kent State shootings on May 4, 1970.

Lewis studied poetry with Black Mountain poet Ed Dorn, British poet Eric Mottram and Robert Bertholf, an English professor at Kent who later was named the curator of the poetry collection and Charles D. Abbot Scholar at the University at Buffalo.

== Devo ==
In 1970, Lewis and Gerald Casale began working on a theme of de-evolution in response to the Kent State shootings. In 1971, Lewis, along with Devo co-founder Casale and Peter Gregg, recorded three proto-Devo songs—"I Been Refused", "I Need a Chick" and "Auto Modown"—on primitive recording equipment located over Guido's Pizza Shop in Kent, Ohio. Lewis and Casale wrote seminal tracts on de-evolution for the now-defunct LA Staff. In 1973, they formed the band Devo with Mark Mothersbaugh and in late 1974, Bob Mothersbaugh took over the band's duties as lead guitarist, causing Lewis to take a more managerial position.

Recommendations from David Bowie and Iggy Pop enabled Devo to secure a recording contract with Warner Bros. In 1978, after the band achieved success, Lewis asked for accreditation and compensation for his contributions to the band. The band refused to negotiate and sued Lewis in Los Angeles County Superior Court, seeking a declaratory judgment stating that Lewis had no rights to the name or theory of de-evolution. Lewis then filed an action in United States District Court for the Northern District of Ohio, alleging theft of intellectual property. During discovery, Lewis produced articles, promotional materials, documentary evidence and an interview with Lewis and band members recorded at the Akron Art Museum following the premiere of In the Beginning was the End. In the interview, Mark Mothersbaugh, drummer Alan Myers and other band members credited Lewis with developing the theory of de-evolution [see external link 10 below]. The band settled for an undisclosed sum.

In 2017, Lewis appeared at the annual DEVOtional fan gathering in Cleveland, performing early Devo songs with Casale and others. This event was reportedly the first time Lewis and Casale had performed together in over 40 years.

== Other work ==
Lewis' poetry has been published in Creedences, Shelley's and in Poetry Review when Eric Mottram was editor. In 1977, he released a book of poetry titled Viscerally, illustrated by Fran Fecko and published by Tom Beckett.

In 1980, Lewis wrote and performed the song "Andrea" under the name Hurricane Bob for the Akron new wave compilation album Bowling Balls from Hell and later worked on videos with new wave groups Tin Huey, Hammer Damage and Human Switchboard. In the 1980s, while working as a consultant in Damascus, Syria, he was Middle East Correspondent for Rolling Stock magazine, published by Ed and Jennifer Dunbar Dorn.

== Films ==
- Devo (dir. Chris Smith, 2024)
