= Jim Mothersbaugh =

American drummer (born 1954)

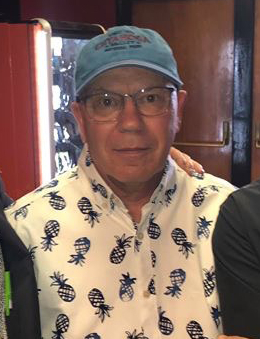
- Mothersbaugh in 2019

Background information
- Born: James Michael Mothersbaugh; January 18, 1954 (age 72); Akron, Ohio, U.S.
- Genres: Art punk; electronic rock; proto-punk; new wave; synth-punk
- Occupations: Musician; equipment technician; sound engineer
- Instrument: Drums
- Years active: 1973–present

James Michael Mothersbaugh (/ˈmʌðərzbɔː/; born January 18, 1954) is an American electronic engineer and former musician. He was the second drummer of the new wave band Devo, replacing Rod Reisman who played for only one show. Mothersbaugh joined Devo with his older brothers, Mark and Bob. He was in the band from 1973 to 1976.

Mothersbaugh appears on several early Devo demos. Later on, he performed as an equipment technician for the band on the 1980 tour, and worked at Roland through much of the 1980s helping to develop MIDI technology.
