= Bob Mothersbaugh =

American songwriter, composer, and musician (born 1952)

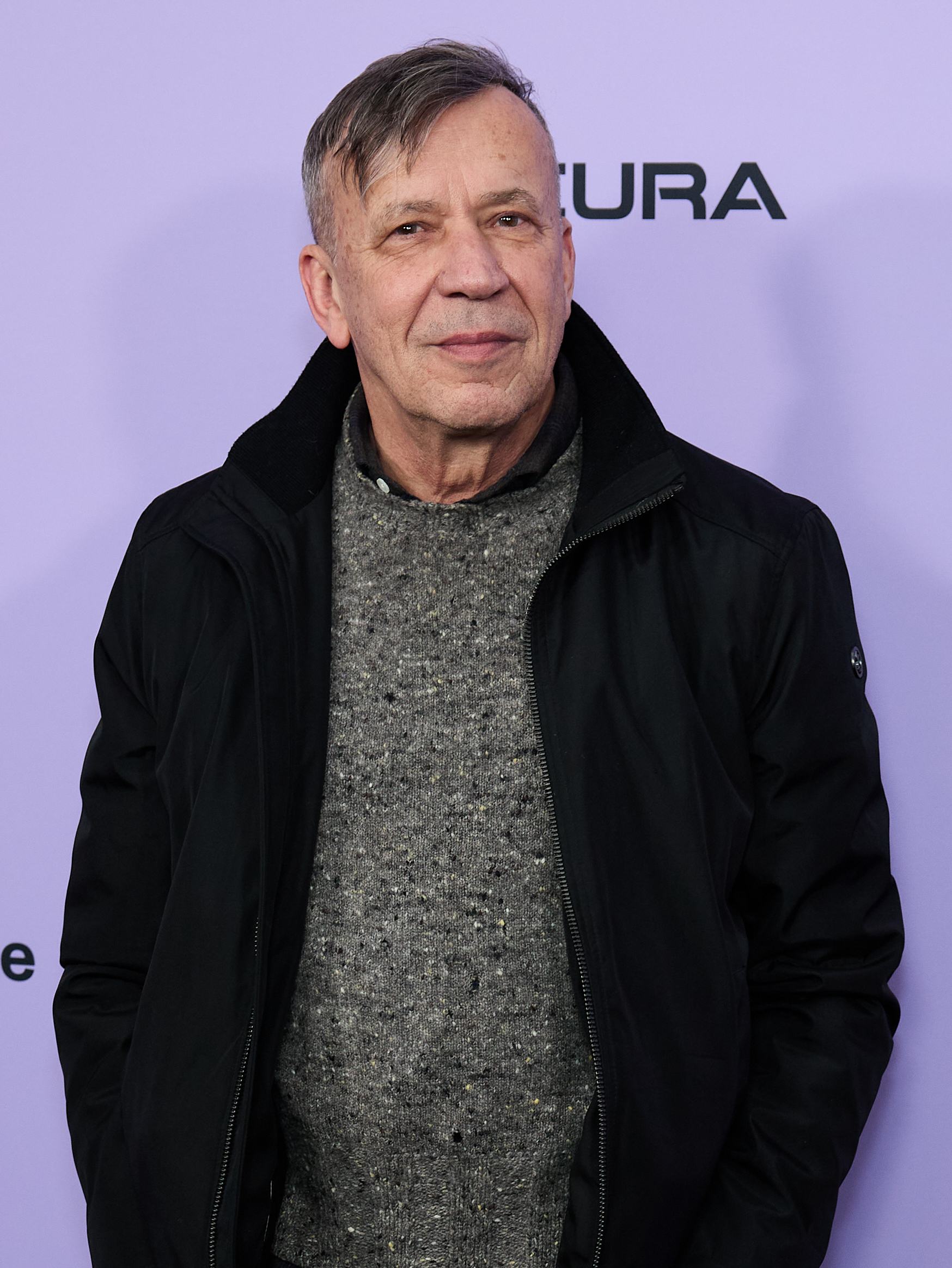
- Mothersbaugh at the premiere of the documentary film Devo at the 2024 Sundance Film Festival

Background information
- Also known as: Bob 1
- Born: Robert Leroy Mothersbaugh Jr. August 11, 1952 (age 74); Akron, Ohio, U.S.
- Genres: New wave; punk rock; post-punk; electropunk; art punk; synth-pop; electronic rock
- Occupations: Singer; songwriter; composer; musician
- Instruments: Vocals; guitar
- Years active: 1974–present

Robert Leroy Mothersbaugh Jr. (/ˈmʌðərzbɔː/; born August 11, 1952), also known by his stage name Bob 1, is an American musician, singer, songwriter and composer.

Mothersbaugh's music career spans more than 45 years. He came to prominence in the late 1970s as lead guitarist and occasional lead singer of the new wave band Devo, which released a top 20 hit in 1980 with the single "Whip It". The band has maintained a cult following throughout its existence. He is the younger brother of co-founder and lead singer Mark Mothersbaugh.

== Early years ==
Robert Leroy Mothersbaugh Jr. was born on August 11, 1952, in Akron, Ohio. He is the son of Mary Margaret ("Mig") and Robert Mothersbaugh Sr. He grew up with one older brother, Mark, and one younger brother, Jim, and two sisters, Amy and Susan. In high school, he played in the cover band Jitters with his brother Jim Mothersbaugh and Greg Brosch on guitar and Greg Kaiser on bass. His father appeared in early Devo films and fan events as the character General Boy, and his brothers participated in the band, although Jim's tenure was brief, appearing only on several early demos.

== Career ==
=== Devo ===
Devo had been founded by Mothersbaugh's older brother, Mark, and Gerald Casale in 1973. Mothersbaugh joined the band playing lead guitar in 1974, together with their other brother Jim playing drums. After the band underwent various line-up changes, Bob Mothersbaugh became part of the most popular five-piece incarnation, which comprised the Casale brothers: Gerald and Bob ("Bob 2") and the Mothersbaugh brothers: Mark and Bob ("Bob 1"), as well as drummer Alan Myers. In 1981, Mothersbaugh, with Devo, served as Toni Basil's backing band on Word of Mouth, her debut album, which included versions of three Devo songs, recorded with Basil singing lead.

Mothersbaugh and the other Devo members were part of the Church of the SubGenius.

=== Other work ===
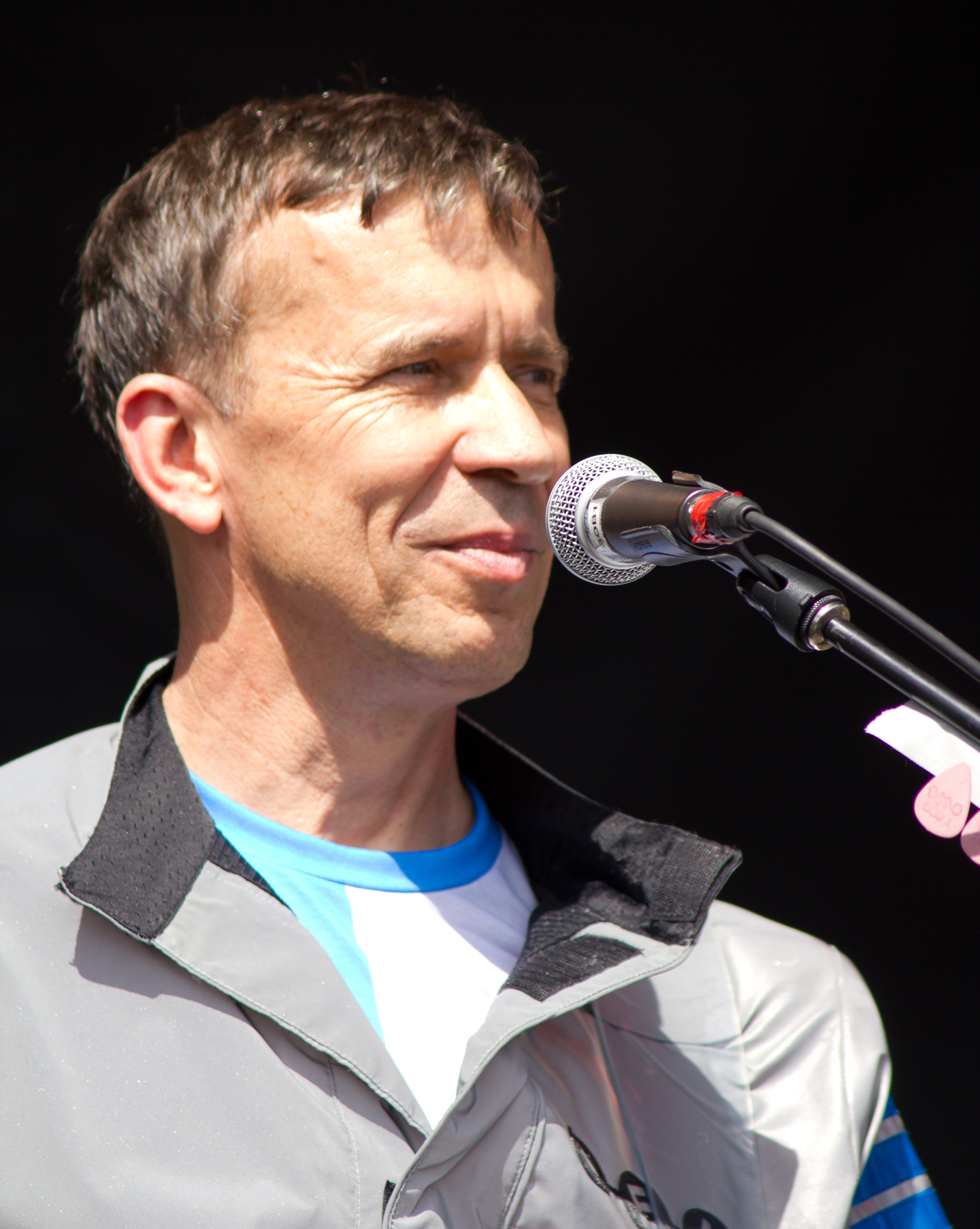
Mothersbaugh in 2011

In 1989, Bob Mothersbaugh and other members of Devo were involved in the project Visiting Kids, releasing a self-titled EP on the New Rose label in 1990. The group featured Mark Mothersbaugh's then-wife Nancye Ferguson, as well as David Kendrick, Bob Mothersbaugh and Bob's daughter Alex Mothersbaugh. Their record was produced by Bob Casale and Mark Mothersbaugh, and Mark also co-wrote some of the songs. Visiting Kids appeared on the soundtrack to the film Rockula, as well as on the Late Show with David Letterman. A promotional video was filmed for the song "Trilobites".

Following Devo's hiatus in 1991, Mothersbaugh founded his own band called The Bob I Band and recorded an unreleased album with the drummer, David Kendrick. The master tapes were lost, although a bootleg of the band is circulating.

Mothersbaugh produces soundtracks for film and television, such as the animated television series Rugrats, as part of the production company Mutato Muzika.

In 2015, Mothersbaugh performed the theme to Harvey Beaks.

== Equipment ==
=== Current ===
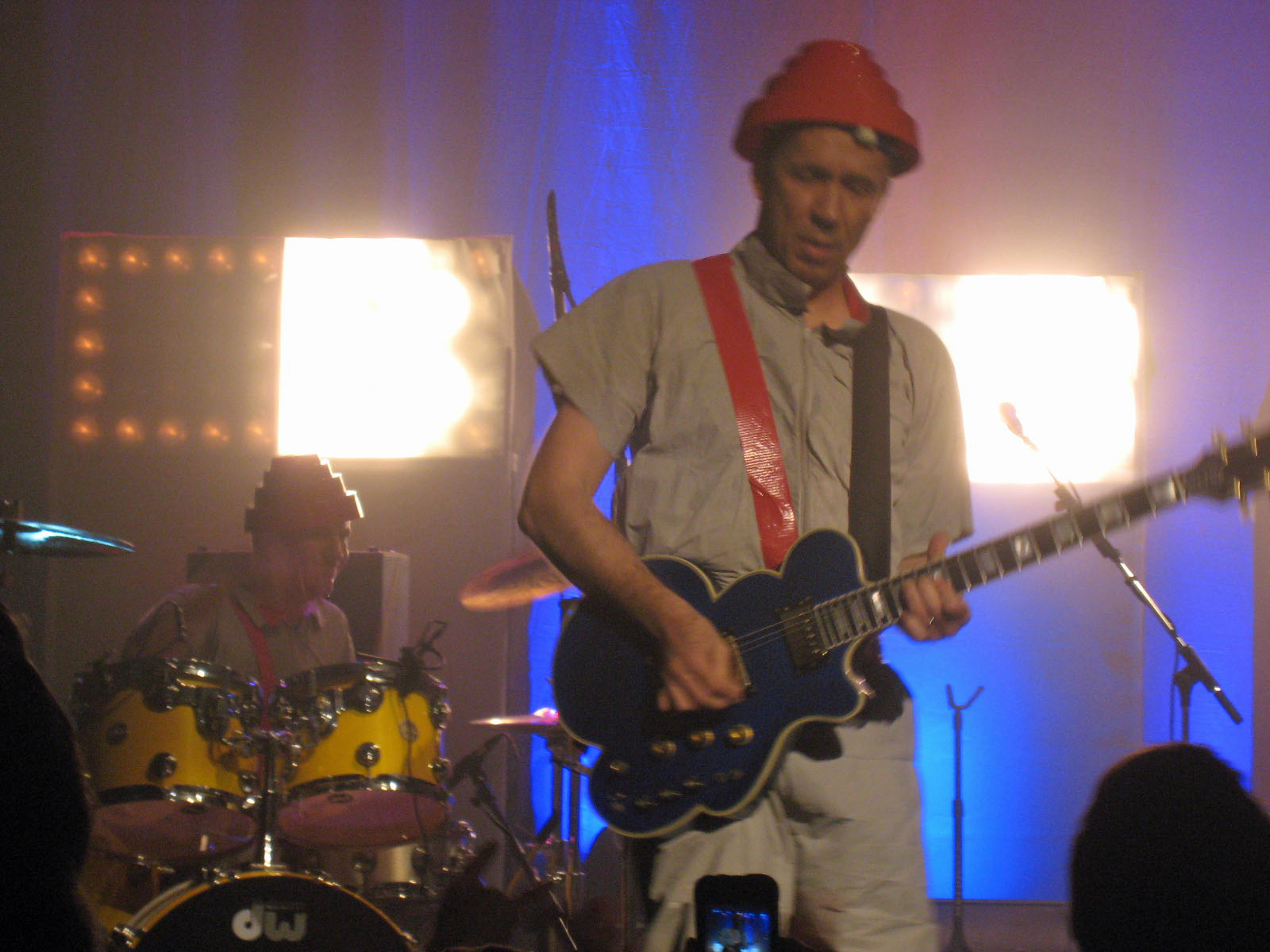
Bob playing his Ibanez "Spud" guitar live in 2009

- Gibson Custom Michael Bloomfield 1959 Les Paul
- LaBaye 2x4
- Fractal Audio Axe-FX Ultra
- Ibanez TS-9 Tube Screamer

=== Former ===
- G&L SC2 Student Model
- G&L F100 Series II
- G&L Comanche
- J.B. Player "Buick" (with Bigsby vibrato tailpiece)
- Kay K1962
- Fender Mustang
- Fender Swinger
- Fender Telecaster
- Gibson Les Paul (modified w/ inverted horn)
- Gibson Les Paul Jr. Doublecut
- Gibson SG
- Chopper Guitars "Spudocaster"
- Gibson L6-S Natural Maple
- Ibanez custom blue "Spud" guitar
- Ibanez Destroyer (Gibson Explorer copy)
- Ibanez Iceman
- Green "T-style" guitar built by Buzz Feiten
- Line 6 POD XT and X3s

== Soundtracks ==
=== Television ===
Years	Title	Notes
1992-1995	Adventures in Wonderland	with Mark Mothersbaugh, Denis M. Hannigan, Rusty Andrews, Josh Mancell and Ryan Moore
1994–2004	Rugrats	with Denis M. Hannigan, Rusty Andrews, and Mark Mothersbaugh
1995	Santo Bugito	with Mark Mothersbaugh, and Bruce Young Berman
1996–1997	Life's Work	with Mark Mothersbaugh
1998–2004	The Wild Thornberrys	with Mark Mothersbaugh and Drew Neumann
2003	The Groovenians	with Mark Mothersbaugh, Bob Casale, Albert Fox, Al Mothersbaugh, Josh Mancell, Andrew Todd, and Pat Irwin (additional music)
2003–2008	All Grown Up!	with Mark Mothersbaugh
2015	Exchange Student Zero	with Bradley Hugh Denniston, and Ray Plaza
2015–2017	Harvey Beaks	with Ego Plum, Steve Bartek, David J.
2016-2018	Beat Bugs	28 episodes
2018	Motown Magic	
2021–2024	Rugrats	Theme by Mark Mothersbaugh

=== Film ===
Year	Title	Director(s)	Studio(s)	Notes
1988	Slaughterhouse Rock	Dimitri Logothetis	Arista Films	—N/a
1999	200 Cigarettes	Risa Bramon Garcia	Paramount Pictures	with Mark Mothersbaugh
2002	Hansel and Gretel	Gary J. Tunnicliffe	Tag Entertainment	with Rusty Andrews
2004	The Life Aquatic with Steve Zissou	Wes Anderson	Touchstone Pictures	—N/a
2006	How to Eat Fried Worms	Bob Dolman	New Line Cinema	with Mark Mothersbaugh
