= Devo discography =

Summary of the music published by the band Devo

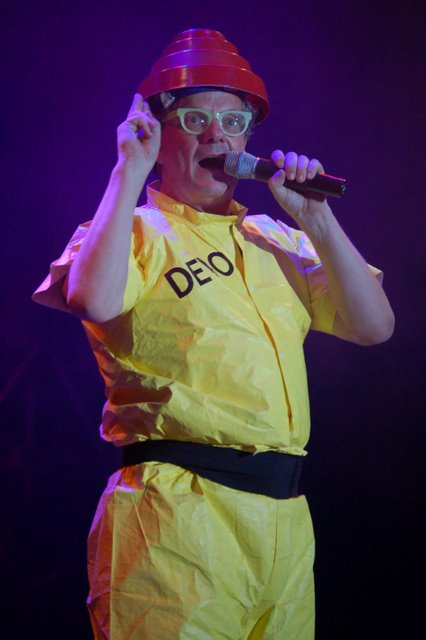
- Mark Mothersbaugh performing as part of Devo at Benicàssim, on July 20, 2007.
- Studio albums: 9
- Extended plays: 10
- Soundtrack albums: 1
- Live albums: 10
- Compilation albums: 16
- Singles: 25
- Video albums: 9

The discography of Devo, an American new wave band formed in 1973, consists of 25 singles and 9 studio albums. Devo was founded by Gerald Casale, Bob Lewis and Mark Mothersbaugh. Devo currently consists of brothers Mark Mothersbaugh (synthesizers, guitar, lead vocals) and Bob Mothersbaugh (lead guitar, lead and backing vocals), Gerald Casale (bass guitar, keyboards, lead and backing vocals), Josh Hager (rhythm guitar, keyboards) and Josh Freese (drums). The band rose to prominence in the US during the new wave era with their single "Whip It". The band have released nine studio albums, ten extended plays, fourteen compilation albums, ten live albums, one soundtrack album and twenty-five singles.

Before signing a record contract with Warner Bros. in the US, the band released several singles on the independent Stiff Records label that charted in the UK. Devo followed up with their debut full-length album Q: Are We Not Men? A: We Are Devo! in July 1978. The album reached No. 12 in the UK and No. 78 in the US. In 1980, Devo released Freedom of Choice, which went Platinum in the US and Gold in Canada, making it their highest selling album. Their 1981 follow-up, New Traditionalists, peaked at No. 23 on the American charts and was their final album to chart in the UK. Devo's chart success slowly fell throughout the decade until they released their apparently final studio album, Smooth Noodle Maps, in 1990; it failed to chart in either the US or the UK.

In 1996, Devo released a multimedia CD-ROM adventure game, Devo Presents Adventures of the Smart Patrol, through Inscape. Members of Devo also began recording together under different aliases, including the surf rock-influenced the Wipeouters and Jihad Jerry & the Evildoers. From 1990 through 2009, no new albums under the Devo name were released. However, a new single, "Watch Us Work It", was released as a digital download in 2007 and as part of a 12-inch EP in 2008. A new studio album, Something for Everybody, was released on June 15, 2010.

A tribute album to Devo, entitled We Are Not Devo, was released by Centipede Records in 1997 and featured various artists—including the Aquabats, Voodoo Glow Skulls and the Vandals—covering some of the band's songs.

== Albums ==
=== Studio albums ===
| Year | Title | Peak chart positions | | | | | Certifications |
| Year | Title | US | AUS | CAN | NZ | UK | Certifications |
|---|---|---|---|---|---|---|---|
| 1978 | Q: Are We Not Men? A: We Are Devo!: Released: August 1978; Label: Warner Bros.; Formats: CD, cassette, vinyl, 8-track tape | 78 | 57 | — | 7 | 12 | RIAA: Gold; BPI: Silver |
| 1979 | Duty Now for the Future: Released: July 1979; Label: Warner Bros.; Formats: CD, cassette, vinyl, 8-track tape | 73 | 51 | 87 | 13 | 49 | |
| 1980 | Freedom of Choice: Released: May 1980; Label: Warner Bros.; Formats: CD, cassette, vinyl, 8-track tape | 22 | 5 | 75 | 9 | 47 | RIAA: Platinum; MC: Gold |
| 1981 | New Traditionalists: Released: August 1981; Label: Warner Bros.; Formats: CD, cassette, vinyl, 8-track tape | 23 | 3 | 32 | 6 | 50 | |
| 1982 | Oh, No! It's Devo: Released: October 1982; Label: Warner Bros.; Formats: CD, vinyl, 8-track tape | 47 | 57 | — | 10 | — | |
| 1984 | Shout: Released: October 1984; Label: Warner Bros.; Formats: CD, cassette, vinyl | 83 | — | 92 | — | — | |
| 1988 | Total Devo: Released: May 1988; Label: Enigma; Formats: CD, cassette, vinyl, DAT | 189 | — | — | — | — | |
| 1990 | Smooth Noodle Maps: Released: June 1990; Label: Enigma; Formats: CD, cassette, vinyl, DAT | — | — | — | — | — | |
| 2010 | Something for Everybody: Released: June 15, 2010; Label: Warner Bros.; Formats: CD, vinyl, digital | 30 | — | — | — | 164 | |
"—" denotes releases that did not chart.

=== Live albums ===
| Year | Title | Notes |
|---|---|---|
| 1981 | DEV-O Live: Released: 1981; Label: Warner Bros. | Live EP |
| 1989 | Now It Can Be Told: Devo at the Palace: Released: 1989; Label: Enigma | Live 1988 |
| 1992 | Devo Live: The Mongoloid Years: Released: October 1992; Label: Rykodisc | |
| 2005 | Devo Live 1980: Released: July 12, 2005; Label: Target Video | DualDisc containing both audio and video performance. |
| 2005 | Live in Central Park: Released: July 26, 2005; Label: DiscLive | |
| 2012 | Live 1981 Seattle: Released: April 21, 2012; Label: Booji Boy | Record Store Day release; CD version released on May 14, 2013, with two bonus tracks |
| 2014 | Live at Max's Kansas City – November 15, 1977: Released: April 19, 2014; Label: Jackpot | Record Store Day release |
| 2014 | Butch Devo and the Sundance Gig: Released: April 19, 2014; Label: MVD | Record Store Day release; 12-inch vinyl picture disc; Also includes DVD |
| 2014 | Miracle Witness Hour: Released: November 17, 2014; Label: Futurismo | Live at the Eagle Street Saloon in Cleveland, Ohio, 1977. |
| 2015 | Hardcore Devo Live!: Released: February 24, 2015; Label: MVD | |
| 2026 | Nitrous Nightmare: Released: June 19, 2026; Label: Futurismo | Live at the WHK Auditorium in Cleveland, Ohio, 1975. Contains the debut performance of "Jocko Homo". |

=== Soundtracks ===
| Year | Title | Notes |
|---|---|---|
| 1996 | Adventures of the Smart Patrol: Released: August 27, 1996; Label: Discover | Soundtrack of Devo's PC CD-ROM game of the same name. Includes a few catalog songs, two new songs, a spruced up demo recording and a few tracks by other artists. |
| 2025 | Energy Dome Frequencies: Songs from the Devo Documentary: Released: October 31, 2025; Label: Rhino | Soundtrack to the Netflix documentary |

=== Compilation albums ===
| Year | Title | Notes |
|---|---|---|
| 1981 | E-Z Listening Disc: Released: 1981; Label: Rykodisc | Compiles all but one of the tracks from Devo's two E-Z Listening Muzak Cassettes, which had been available only through Club Devo in 1981, respectively, consisting of instrumental versions of classic Devo songs performed in the style of easy listening Muzak or new-age music. |
| 1984 | E-Z Listening Disc Volume 2: Released: 1984; Label: Rykodisc | |
| 1990 | Hardcore Devo: Volume One: Released: August 17, 1990; Label: Rykodisc | Basement demo recordings from 1974–1977. |
| 1990 | Greatest Hits: Released: December 1990; Label: Warner Bros. | |
| 1990 | Greatest Misses: Released: December 1990; Label: Warner Bros. | |
| 1991 | Hardcore Devo: Volume Two: Released: August 23, 1991; Label: Rykodisc | More basement demo recordings from 1974–1977. |
| 1993 | Hot Potatoes: The Best of Devo: Released: 1993; Label: Virgin | |
| 1998 | Greatest Hits: Released: November 3, 1998; Label: Discover | Budget compilation. Includes studio tracks from the two Restless/Enigma albums and live tracks from Now It Can Be Told. |
| 2000 | Pioneers Who Got Scalped: The Anthology: Released: May 9, 2000; Label: Rhino/Warner Bros. Archives | Two-disc set spanning Devo's entire career. Contains 17 previously unreleased tracks. |
| 2000 | Recombo DNA: Released: 2000; Label: Rhino Handmade | Limited edition two-disc set of previously unreleased material including demos, alternate mixes, live tracks and outtakes. |
| 2002 | The Essentials: Released: April 2, 2002; Label: Rhino | Budget compilation. |
| 2003 | Whip It & Other Hits: Released: October 10, 2003; Label: Rhino | Budget compilation. |
| 2013 | Something Else for Everybody: Released: July 23, 2013; Label: Warner Bros. | A digital collection of 11 tracks from the Something for Everybody sessions that didn't make the album. Released on CD by Booji Boy Records on May 20, 2014. |
| 2015 | Social Fools: The Virgin Singles 1978–1982: Released: October 23, 2015; Label: Virgin | A compilation of all the singles released in the UK by Virgin Records |
| 2016 | E-Z Listening Muzak: Released: 2016; Label: Futurismo | Re-release of the E-Z Listening Disc CD with the omitted cassette track, and new recording of "Human Rocket" |
| 2023 | Art Devo 1973–1977: Released: September 2023 | Collection of rarities from their early years |
| 2023 | 50 Years of De-Evolution 1973–2023: Released: October 2023 | Collection of hits and rarities |

=== Box sets ===
| Year | Title | Notes |
|---|---|---|
| 2008 | This Is the Devo Box: Released: July 23, 2008; Label: Warner Music Life | Fully remastered CD box set of Devo's Warner Brothers releases (including DEV-O Live) in miniature LP sleeve replicas. Available only in Japan. A vinyl version (minus DEV-O Live and the "Working in the Coal Mine" 7-inch) was released in the US for Record Store Day 2019. |
| 2009 | The Ultra DEVO-lux Ltd. Edition: Released: December 23, 2009; Label: Warner Bros. | Limited edition box set containing remastered CDs of Q: Are We Not Men? A: We Are Devo! and Freedom of Choice, a live DVD of Devo performing Q: Are We Not Men? at the London Forum, a DVD of music videos and a 7-inch single of "Jocko Homo" and "Mongoloid" on yellow vinyl. |

== Extended plays ==
| Year | Title | Peak chart positions | | | | Notes |
| Year | Title | US | AUS | NZ | UK | Notes |
|---|---|---|---|---|---|---|
| 1977 | B Stiff: Label: Stiff; Formats: Vinyl | — | — | — | — | Compiles the first three Devo singles released on Stiff Records. |
| 1978 | Mechanical Man: Label: Elevator; Formats: Vinyl | — | — | — | — | "Club Devo" webmaster Michael Pilmer states that it was a promo produced by Virgin Records and included with some copies of the band's debut album Q: Are We Not Men? A: We Are Devo! in the United Kingdom. |
| 1981 | DEV-O Live: Label: Warner Bros.; Formats: CD, vinyl | 50 | 1 | 14 | — | Live EP from the Freedom of Choice tour |
| 1983 | Theme from Doctor Detroit: Label: MCA Records; Formats: Vinyl | 59 | 88 | 42 | 98 | |
| 1988 | Baby Doll EP: Label: Enigma; Formats: 12-inch vinyl, CD | — | — | — | — | |
| 1988 | Disco Dancer EP: Label: Enigma; Formats: 12-inch vinyl, CD, Mini CD | — | — | — | — | |
| 1990 | Post Post-Modern Man EP: Label: Enigma; Formats: CD Maxi-Single | — | — | — | — | |
| 2008 | Watch Us Work It: Label: MVD; Formats: 12-inch vinyl | — | — | — | — | Vinyl release of the downloadable single. |
| 2010 | Song Study EP: Label: Warner Bros.; Formats: Digital download | — | — | — | — | |
| 2011 | What We Do: Electro-Devo Remix Cornucopia – EP: Label: Warner Bros.; Formats: Digital download | — | — | — | — | |
"—" denotes releases that did not chart.

== Singles ==
| Year | Title | Peak chart positions | | | | | | Certifications | Album/EP |
| Year | Title | US | US Dance | AUS | CAN | NZ | UK | Certifications | Album/EP |
|---|---|---|---|---|---|---|---|---|---|
| 1977 | "Mongoloid" | — | — | — | — | — | — | | B Stiff |
| 1977 | "(I Can't Get No) Satisfaction" | — | — | 98 | — | — | 41 | | B Stiff and Q: Are We Not Men? A: We Are Devo! |
| 1978 | "Jocko Homo" | — | — | — | — | — | 62 | | Q: Are We Not Men? A: We Are Devo! |
| 1978 | "Be Stiff" | — | — | — | — | — | 71 | | B Stiff |
| 1978 | "Come Back Jonee" | — | — | — | — | — | 60 | | Q: Are We Not Men? A: We Are Devo! |
| 1979 | "The Day My Baby Gave Me a Surprize" | — | — | — | — | — | — | | Duty Now for the Future |
| 1979 | "Secret Agent Man" | — | — | — | — | — | — | | Duty Now for the Future |
| 1980 | "Girl U Want" | — | — | — | — | — | — | | Freedom of Choice |
| 1980 | "Whip It" | 14 | 8^{[A]} | 77 | 11 | 11 | 51 | RIAA: Platinum; MC: Gold | Freedom of Choice |
| 1980 | "Gates of Steel" | — | 8^{[A]} | — | — | — | — | | Freedom of Choice |
| 1980 | "Freedom of Choice" | 103 | 71 | — | — | — | — | | Freedom of Choice |
| 1981 | "Working in the Coal Mine" | 43^{[B]} | 30 | 20 | 17 | 8 | — | | Heavy Metal (soundtrack) |
| 1981 | "Beautiful World" | 102 | — | 14 | — | 15 | — | | New Traditionalists |
| 1981 | "Through Being Cool" | 107 | 32^{[C]} | — | — | — | — | | New Traditionalists |
| 1982 | "Jerkin' Back 'n' Forth" | — | — | — | — | — | — | | New Traditionalists |
| 1982 | "Peek-a-Boo!" | 106 | 13 | 45 | — | — | — | | Oh, No! It's Devo |
| 1982 | "That's Good" | 104 | 6^{[D]} | — | — | — | — | | Oh, No! It's Devo |
| 1983 | "Theme from Doctor Detroit" | 59 | 50 | 88 | — | 42 | 98 | | Doctor Detroit (soundtrack) |
| 1984 | "Are U Experienced?" | — | — | — | — | — | — | | Shout |
| 1985 | "Here to Go" | ^{[E]} | — | 40 | — | — | — | | Shout |
| 1985 | "Shout" | — | — | — | — | — | — | | Shout |
| 1988 | "Disco Dancer" | ^{[E]} | 45 | — | — | — | — | | Total Devo |
| 1988 | "Baby Doll" | — | — | — | — | — | — | | Total Devo |
| 1990 | "Post Post-Modern Man" | ^{[F]} | 26 | — | — | — | — | | Smooth Noodle Maps |
| 1990 | "Stuck in a Loop" | — | — | — | — | — | — | | Smooth Noodle Maps |
| 2007 | "Watch Us Work It" | — | — | — | — | — | — | | Something for Everybody |
| 2009 | "Don't Shoot (I'm a Man)" | — | — | — | — | — | — | | Something for Everybody |
| 2010 | "Fresh" | — | — | — | — | — | — | | Something for Everybody |
| 2010 | Greetings from Akron, Ohio (Split 7-inch with the Black Keys); Devo track is "Human Rocket" | — | — | — | — | — | — | | Non-album single |
"—" denotes releases that did not chart.

- A "Whip It" and "Freedom of Choice" charted together with "Gates of Steel" as a triple-sided single on the Billboard Hot Dance/Disco chart.
- B "Working in the Coal Mine" additionally charted at number 53 on the Billboard Mainstream Rock Tracks chart.
- C "Through Being Cool" charted together with "Jerkin' Back 'n' Forth" and "Going Under" as a triple-sided single on the Billboard Hot Dance/Disco chart.
- D "That's Good" charted together with "Speed Racer" as a double-sided hit on the Billboard Hot Dance/Disco chart.
- E "Here to Go" and "Disco Dancer" additionally charted on the Billboard Hot Dance Music/Maxi-Singles Sales chart at numbers 44 and 40 respectively.
- F "Post Post-Modern Man" additionally charted at #7 on the Billboard Modern Rock Tracks chart.

== Other releases ==
This section is intended to be a compendium of the many properly released tracks that Devo has recorded for TV and film soundtracks, video games and various artists compilation albums, as well as rare remixes and other oddities. It does not list any of the tracks that appeared on proper studio albums and singles, nor any tracks from collections of previously unreleased songs (such as the Hardcore Devo compilations) or illicit bootleg releases.

| Year | Title | Source | Notes |
|---|---|---|---|
| 1979 | "Flimsy Wrap" | 7-inch flexi-disc included with UK picture disc copies of Q: Are We Not Men? A: We Are Devo! | Segment of a radio DJ talking during a set break of the band's 11/10/78 concert at the Old Waldorf, San Francisco, California |
| 1979 | "It Takes a Worried Man" (AKA: "Worried Man Blues") | Pioneers Who Got Scalped: The Anthology | A cover of the folk song by the Carter Family, from the film Human Highway |
| 1981 | "Uncontrollable Urge" (Live) | Urgh! A Music War: The Album | Recorded live at the California Theater, San Diego, CA, August 20, 1980 |
| 1982 | "That's Good" (Extended Version) | "That's Good" promotional 12-inch single | Artificially extended mix using "cut and paste" techniques |
| 1982 | "Speed Racer" (Extended Version) | "That's Good" promotional 12-inch single | Artificially extended mix using "cut and paste" techniques |
| 1983 | "Luv-Luv" | Songs from the Original Motion Picture Soundtrack Doctor Detroit | |
| 1983 | "That's Good (Extended Edit)" | Disconet Program Service Volume 5 Program 9, Disconet Mix, 1983 | Mixed By Valapucci |
| 1985 | "Let's Talk" | Fright Night: Original Motion Picture Soundtrack. Reissued on Pioneers Who Got Scalped: The Anthology. | |
| 1986 | "Bread and Butter" | 9½ Weeks: Original Motion Picture Soundtrack. Reissued on Pioneers Who Got Scalped: The Anthology. | A cover of the song by the Newbeats |
| 1987 | "I Wouldn't Do That to You" | Pioneers Who Got Scalped: The Anthology | From the film Happy Hour |
| 1987 | "Itsy Bitsy Teenie Weenie Yellow Polka Dot Bikini" | Pioneers Who Got Scalped: The Anthology | A cover of the song by Brian Hyland, from the film Revenge of the Nerds II: Nerds in Paradise |
| 1988 | "Bush Whacked" | Recombo DNA | 1979 session outtake jam. 7-inch flexi-disc included with Volume 1, Issue 6 of Reflex Magazine in August 1988. An extended version (labeled "Prosthetic Version") was issued on Recombo DNA. |
| 1988 | "Baby Doll (Sung in Swedish)" | Tapeheads: Music from the Original Motion Picture Soundtrack | Alternate version of "Baby Doll" from Total Devo |
| 1993 | "Whip It" (HMS & M Mix) | Hot Potatoes: The Best of Devo | Remixed by Psychoslaphead |
| 1995 | "Are You Ready?!" | Mighty Morphin Power Rangers: the Movie - Music From and Inspired by the Motion Picture | |
| 1995 | "Girl U Want" (Remake) | Tank Girl: Music From the Motion Picture Soundtrack | Based on the cover by Soundgarden |
| 1995 | "Part of You" | Infinite Zero CD reissue of Oh, No! It's Devo | Previously unreleased 1982 session outtake from Oh, No! It's Devo |
| 1996 | "Supercop" | Supercop: Music From and Inspired by the Dimension Motion Picture | |
| 1996 | "Head Like a Hole" | Supercop: Music From and Inspired by the Dimension Motion Picture. Reissued on Pioneers Who Got Scalped: The Anthology. | A cover of the song by Nine Inch Nails |
| 1996 | "Theme From Adventures of the Smart Patrol" | Music From Adventures of the Smart Patrol | A studio version of an instrumental track played by Devo at the beginning of concerts on their New Traditionalists tour. Recorded for the Inscape PC CD-ROM game Adventures of the Smart Patrol under the name "The Smart Patrol". |
| 1996 | "That's What He Said" | Music From Adventures of the Smart Patrol | Recorded for the Inscape PC CD-ROM game Adventures of the Smart Patrol under the name "The Smart Patrol". |
| 1996 | "U Got Me Bugged" (Alternate Vocal Mix) | Music From Adventures of the Smart Patrol | Demo recorded in 1975 and released in 1991 on Hardcore Devo: Vol. 2. Overdubbed for the Inscape PC CD-ROM game Adventures of the Smart Patrol. |
| 1997 | "Thanks to You" | Pioneers Who Got Scalped: The Anthology | From the film Meet Wally Sparks |
| 1997 | "Communication Break-up" | Pioneers Who Got Scalped: The Anthology | From the film Meet Wally Sparks |
| 1998 | "Huboon Stomp" | Chef Aid: The South Park Album | A studio version of a very early Devo song that had only been performed live |
| 1998 | "Witch Doctor" | The Rugrats Movie: Music From the Motion Picture | A cover of the song by Ross Bagdasarian Sr. |
| 1999 | "One Dumb Thing" | Pioneers Who Got Scalped: The Anthology | 1982 session outtake from Oh, No! It's Devo. Restored, remixed and completed for the PC CD-ROM game Interstate '82. |
| 1999 | "Faster and Faster" | Recombo DNA | 1982 session outtake from Oh, No! It's Devo. Restored, remixed and completed for the PC CD-ROM game Interstate '82. |
| 1999 | "Modern Life" | Recombo DNA | 1982 session outtake from Oh, No! It's Devo. Restored, remixed and completed for the PC CD-ROM game Interstate '82. |
| 2000 | "The Words Get Stuck in My Throat" | Pioneers Who Got Scalped: The Anthology | Studio version of a song sung by Booji Boy and often played live on the early tours. The song originates from the 1966 Japanese sci-fi film War of the Gargantuas. |
| 2001 | "It's All Good" | Digital download | Originally released as a flash animation on Shockwave, credited to "Big Dirty Farmers". No longer available, but audio circulates as bootleg. |
| 2002 | "Ohio" | When Pigs Fly: Songs You Never Thought You'd Hear | A cover of the song by Crosby, Stills, Nash & Young, chronicling the events of the Kent State massacre of 1970. (Devo members Mark Mothersbaugh and Gerald Casale have often cited this event as the catalyst for the creation of Devo.) |
| 2003 | "Go Monkey Go" | Heroes & Villains: Music Inspired by the Powerpuff Girls | A song written for the character Mojo Jojo and appearing in bumpers for the Cartoon Network |
| 2004 | "Whip It" (Philip Steir & Ramin Sakurai Remix) | The Cornerstone Player 061 | 2 CD/1 DVD promotional set for the film Hustle & Flow. |
| 2006 | "Girl U Want" (Black Light Odyssey Mix) | Future Retro | |
| 2009 | "Red Shark" | Digital-only "Devo Demo Bundle" for fans who purchased concert tickets | C. 1979–1980 demo version of "It's Not Right" |
| 2009 | "Merry Something to You" | YouTube video | Released December 2009. Video set to stills of Mark Mothersbaugh artwork. Later released on 2010 compilation Gift Wrapped II: Snowed In. |
| 2012 | "Monsterman" | Monster Man TV series. Reissued on Something Else for Everybody. | Theme song for the Syfy series Monster Man. |
| 2012 | "Don't Roof Rack Me, Bro! (Seamus Unleashed)" | Digital download | Song poking fun at the scandal involving Mitt Romney's former dog, Seamus, being strapped to the roof of the family's car in a dog carrier. |
| 2012 | "Don't Roof Rack Me, Bro (Remember Seamus)" [Remix] | Digital download | |
| 2022 | "Empire" | Good Music to Ensure Safe Abortion Access to All | By David Byrne and Devo. Part of a various artists compilation album made available for only 24 hours on Bandcamp, with all proceeds going to Abortion Care Network, Brigid Alliance and Noise for Now. |

== Filmography ==
=== Video releases ===
- 1979: The Men Who Make the Music
- 1984: We're All Devo
- 1993: The Complete Truth About De-Evolution
- 2003: Devo Live
- 2004: Live in the Land of the Rising Sun
- 2005: Devo Live 1980
- 2009: Live at the London HMV Forum – exclusive to Ultra Devo-lux Limited Edition box set
- 2014: Butch Devo and the Sundance Gig – paired with The Men Who Make the Music
- 2015: Hardcore Devo Live!

=== Film appearances ===
- 1976: The Truth About De-Evolution
- 1980: Pray TV – appearing as "Dove"
- 1982: Human Highway
- 1982: Urgh! A Music War
- 1983: Entrées de secours (short)
- 1990: The Spirit of '76
- 1998: The Rugrats Movie
- 2011: Shut Up, Little Man!

=== TV appearances ===
- 1978: Saturday Night Live
- 1979: Chorus
- 1979: Don Kirshner's Rock Concert
- 1980, 1981: Fridays
- 1980: American Bandstand
- 1980: The Merv Griffin Show
- 1981: Evening Magazine
- 1982: Square Pegs
- 1982: Late Night with David Letterman
- 1996: Ellen
- 2019: Chi Chi & Devo – documentary for the Golf Channel
