= 50 Years of De-Evolution 1973–2023 =

Compilation album by Devo
- Released: October 20, 2023
- Genre: New wave
- Length: 158:37
- Label: Rhino

Devo chronology
Hardcore Devo Live! (2015)	50 Years of De-Evolution 1973–2023 (2023)

50 Years of De-Evolution 1973–2023 is a compilation album by American band Devo, released on October 20, 2023, through Rhino Entertainment. The first disc contains the band's hits and more well-known material, while the second disc contains rarities and fan favorites. The release is similar in intent to Pioneers Who Got Scalped: The Anthology, a 2CD Devo compilation released by Rhino in 2000.

50 Years of De-Evolution 1973–2023 received positive reviews from critics. The band embarked on a farewell tour in support of the album.

== Critical reception ==
Professional ratings
Review scores
Source	Rating
AllMusic	4/5 stars
American Songwriter	3/5 stars
Pitchfork	7.4/10

Reviewing the album for Pitchfork, Stephen Thomas Erlewine remarked that it is not "a chronological document, but a celebration of a complex, sometimes baffling body of work. Too long to count as a greatest-hits compilation, too reliant on the band's standards to be of considerable interest to hardcore fans—all the rarities have been in circulation for a while—50 Years of De-Evolution nevertheless portrays an act that simultaneously inhabited its times and pointed the way to the future". Hal Horowitz of American Songwriter stated that it does "a perfectly respectable job" as it compiles the band's "best-known titles, tosses in obscurities from soundtracks along with single B sides and other musical ephemera, and then remasters the audio" but felt "there is little reason for this to exist other than to rake in some bucks by repackaging content any fan already has or for whoever doesn't already own this material". Mark Deming of AllMusic called it "a convenient guide to their history in 50 songs", with the first disc "reveal[ing] how Devo were able to shape their sometimes morbid ideas into expressive and unexpectedly accessible forms (especially after electronics and dance beats became a bigger part of their formula), and the harder-edged material in the second half shows they learned a lot from the electronic artists they most certainly influenced".

== Track listing ==
All tracks are written by Mark Mothersbaugh and Gerald Casale, except where otherwise noted.

50 Years of De-Evolution 1973–2023 disc one track listing
No.	Title	Writer(s)	Source	Length
1.	"Mongoloid" (Warner version)	G. Casale	Q: Are We Not Men? A: We Are Devo!, 1978	3:45
2.	"Jocko Homo" (Warner version)	M. Mothersbaugh	Q: Are We Not Men? A: We Are Devo!	3:39
3.	"(I Can't Get No) Satisfaction"	Mick Jagger, Keith Richards	Q: Are We Not Men? A: We Are Devo!	2:40
4.	"Come Back Jonee"		Q: Are We Not Men? A: We Are Devo!	3:25
5.	"Secret Agent Man"	P. F. Sloan, Steve Barri	Duty Now for the Future, 1979	3:34
6.	"The Day My Baby Gave Me a Surprize"	M. Mothersbaugh	Duty Now for the Future	2:39
7.	"Smart Patrol"		Duty Now for the Future	3:45
8.	"Girl U Want"		Freedom of Choice, 1980	2:57
9.	"Whip It"		Freedom of Choice	2:40
10.	"Freedom of Choice"		Freedom of Choice	3:28
11.	"Gates of Steel"	G. Casale, M. Mothersbaugh, Sue Schmidt, Debbie Smith	Freedom of Choice	3:28
12.	"Working in the Coal Mine"	Allen Toussaint	Single A-side; Heavy Metal Soundtrack; bonus 7" included with some copies of New Traditionalists, 1981	2:49
13.	"Beautiful World"		New Traditionalists	3:30
14.	"Jerkin' Back 'n' Forth"		New Traditionalists	3:04
15.	"Through Being Cool"	G. Casale, M. Mothersbaugh, Bob Mothersbaugh	New Traditionalists	3:11
16.	"Time Out for Fun"		Oh, No! It's Devo, 1982	2:48
17.	"Peek-a-Boo!"		Oh, No! It's Devo	3:01
18.	"That's Good"		Oh, No! It's Devo	3:25
19.	"Big Mess"		Oh, No! It's Devo	2:44
20.	"Here to Go" (Go Mix Version)		Shout, 1984	5:32
21.	"Are You Experienced?"	Jimi Hendrix	Shout	3:09
22.	"Disco Dancer (7" Version)"		Total Devo, 1988	4:10
23.	"Post Post-Modern Man" (Macro Post-Modern Mix)		Smooth Noodle Maps, 1990	3:20
24.	"Fresh"		Something for Everybody, 2010	2:57
Total length:				79:37

50 Years of De-Evolution 1973–2023 disc two track listing
No.	Title	Writer(s)	Source	Length
1.	"I'm a Potato"		1974 Demo	2:23
2.	"Mongoloid" (Booji Boy Version)	G. Casale	Single A-Side, 1977	3:33
3.	"Jocko Homo" (Booji Boy Version)	M. Mothersbaugh	B-side of "Mongoloid" (Booji Boy Version), 1977	3:19
4.	"Be Stiff" (Stiff Version)	G. Casale, Bob Lewis	Single A-side, 1978	2:32
5.	"Uncontrollable Urge"	M. Mothersbaugh	Q: Are We Not Men? A: We Are Devo!	3:10
6.	"Gut Feeling / (Slap Your Mammy)"	M. Mothersbaugh, B. Mothersbaugh / G. Casale	Q: Are We Not Men? A: We Are Devo!	4:57
7.	"Triumph of the Will"		Duty Now for the Future	2:17
8.	"Soo Bawlz"	M. Mothersbaugh	B-side of "Secret Agent Man", 1979	2:21
9.	"It Takes a Worried Man"	Traditional, arr. Tom Glazer, Donald Guard	From the film Human Highway, 1982; recorded 1979	3:28
10.	"Snowball" (Single Remix)		B-side of "Freedom of Choice"; original version from Freedom of Choice	2:27
11.	"Mr. B's Ballroom"	M. Mothersbaugh	Freedom of Choice	2:47
12.	"Going Under"		New Traditionalists	3:26
13.	"Love Without Anger"		New Traditionalists	2:36
14.	"One Dumb Thing"		Interstate '82 CD-ROM game, 1999; recorded 1982/1998	2:45
15.	"Speed Racer"		Oh, No! It's Devo	2:40
16.	"Theme from Doctor Detroit"		Doctor Detroit, 1983	3:09
17.	"Shout"		Shout	3:16
18.	"Puppet Boy"		Shout	3:10
19.	"I Wouldn't Do That to You"		From the film Happy Hour, 1987; recorded 1985	3:14
20.	"Bread and Butter"	Larry Parks, Jay Turnbow	From the film 9½ Weeks, 1986	2:29
21.	"Let's Talk"	M. Mothersbaugh	From the film Fright Night, 1985; recorded 1984	2:41
22.	"Baby Doll" (Devo Single Mix)		Single A-side; original version from Total Devo	3:28
23.	"Some Things Never Change"		Total Devo	4:10
24.	"What We Do" (single edit)	M. Mothersbaugh, G. Casale, Max Liederman	Something for Everybody	3:09
25.	"No Place Like Home"		Something for Everybody	3:19
26.	"Watch Us Work It"	M. Mothersbaugh, G. Casale	Single A-Side, 2007	2:14
Total length:				79:00

All tracks are marked as "2023 remaster".

== Charts ==
Chart performance for 50 Years of De-Evolution 1973–2023
Chart (2024)	Peak position
Croatian International Albums (HDU)	32
Scottish Albums (Official Charts)	47
US Top Album Sales (Billboard)	23
