= E-Z Listening Disc =

Compilation album by Devo
- Released: 1981 (EZ Listening Cassette); 1984 (EZ Listening Cassette Volume 2); 1987 (CD)
- Recorded: 1981, 1984
- Studio: Studio Devo
- Genre: Muzak; new age; lounge
- Length: 37:52 (EZ Listening Cassette); 36:59 (EZ Listening Cassette Volume 2); 70:32 (CD)
- Label: Warner Bros.; Rykodisc; Futurismo
- Producer: Devo

Devo chronology
Shout (1984)	E-Z Listening Disc (1981)	Total Devo (1988)

Professional ratings
Review scores
Source	Rating
AllMusic	1.5/5 stars

E-Z Listening Disc is a compilation album by the American new wave band Devo, originally released in 1987 by Rykodisc. The album is a compilation of all but one of the tracks from Devo's two E-Z Listening Muzak Cassettes, which had been available only through Club Devo in 1981 and 1984, respectively, consisting of instrumental versions of Devo songs performed in the style of easy listening Muzak or new-age music.

== Release history ==
The first 'EZ Listening' Devo release was the 1981 EZ Listening Muzak Cassette, which was available to purchase through mail order slips included with Devo's fourth studio album, New Traditionalists (1981). It featured 10 tracks. In 1984 they followed this up with EZ Listening Muzak Cassette Volume 2, which included 10 more new tracks.

George Petros did the cover art.

In 1987 Rykodisc released E-Z Listening Disc, which included every track from the two cassette albums minus the standard version of "Shout". The "Hello Kitty" version, featuring synthesizers and an electric guitar, was included on the CD, whereas the other is a lounge music version featuring electronic piano, synth bass and drums. Additionally, the CD does not replicate the original cassette running order.

The album was re-released in March 2016, and was available as either a double album or two CD box set. Along with the twenty tracks originally found on the E-Z Listening Cassettes, the re-release also contains a newly recorded easy listening version of the song "Human Rocket" from Devo's 2010 album Something For Everybody.

== Track listing ==
All songs by Mark Mothersbaugh and Gerald V. Casale, except where otherwise indicated.

=== EZ Listening Cassette ===
Side one
No.	Title	Writer(s)	Length
1.	"Come Back Jonee"		3:13
2.	"(I Can't Get No) Satisfaction"	Mick Jagger, Keith Richards	4:12
3.	"Space Junk"	G.V. Casale, Bob Mothersbaugh	2:41
4.	"Jocko Homo"	M. Mothersbaugh	3:37
5.	"Swelling Itching Brain"	M. Mothersbaugh	4:15

Side two
No.	Title	Writer(s)	Length
1.	"Whip It"		3:01
2.	"Mongoloid"	G.V. Casale	5:10
3.	"Girl U Want"		5:01
4.	"Pity You"	M. Mothersbaugh	3:27
5.	"It's a Beautiful World"		3:15

=== EZ Listening Cassette Volume 2 ===
Side one
No.	Title	Writer(s)	Length
1.	"Gates of Steel"	G.V. Casale, M. Mothersbaugh, Sue Schmidt, Debbie Smith	2:57
2.	"That's Good"		3:40
3.	"Jerkin' Back and Forth"		3:12
4.	"Shout"		4:11
5.	"4th Dimension"		3:52

Side two
No.	Title	Writer(s)	Length
1.	"Goin' Under"		3:09
2.	"Peek 'a' Boo"		4:28
3.	"Time Out for Fun"		3:24
4.	"Jurisdiction of Luv"	M. Mothersbaugh	3:44
5.	"Shout (Hello Kitty)"		4:13

=== 1987 Rykodisc CD ===
No.	Title	Writer(s)	Length
1.	"Gates of Steel"	G.V. Casale, M. Mothersbaugh, Schmidt, Smith	2:57
2.	"Girl U Want"		5:01
3.	"Come Back Jonee"		3:13
4.	"Whip It"		3:01
5.	"That's Good"		3:40
6.	"Jerkin' Back and Forth"		3:12
7.	"4th Dimension"		3:52
8.	"Shout (Hello Kitty)"		4:13
9.	"Mongoloid"	G.V. Casale	5:10
10.	"Pity You"	M. Mothersbaugh	3:27
11.	"Goin' Under"		3:09
12.	"Swelling Itching Brain"	M. Mothersbaugh	4:15
13.	"Jurisdiction of Luv"	M. Mothersbaugh	3:44
14.	"Peek 'a' Boo"		4:28
15.	"Satisfaction"	Jagger, Richards	4:12
16.	"Space Junk"	G.V. Casale, B. Mothersbaugh	2:41
17.	"Time Out for Fun"		3:24
18.	"It's a Beautiful World"		3:15
19.	"Jocko Homo"	M. Mothersbaugh	3:37

=== 2016 Futurismo double CD/LP ===
CD 2/LP 2 bonus tracks
No.	Title	Writer(s)	Length
9.	"Shout"		4:11
10.	"Human Rocket (Laughing Gas Version)"	M. Mothersbaugh	6:24

== Personnel ==
Devo

- Mark Mothersbaugh
- Bob Mothersbaugh
- Gerald V. Casale
- Bob Casale
- Alan Myers

Technical

- Hank Waring (FDS Labs) – digital processing
- Dr. Toby Mountain – digital consultant
- EXIT – graphic concepts and execution
- Devo – arrangements
- Gerald V. Casale – liner notes (2016 reissue)
