= Here to Go =

Single by Devo

from the album Shout
- Released: March 13, 1985
- Studio: Record Plant (Los Angeles)
- Genre: New wave; synth-pop
- Length: 3:18
- Label: Warner Bros.
- Songwriters: Mark Mothersbaugh; Gerald Casale
- Producer: Devo

Devo singles chronology
"Are You Experienced?" (1984)	"Here to Go" (1985)	"Shout" (1985)

"Here to Go" is a song by the American new wave band Devo, written by Mark Mothersbaugh and Gerald Casale. It was released on their sixth studio album, Shout, in 1984, and was subsequently released as a single in 1985.

== Meaning ==
"Here to Go" was inspired by artist Brion Gysin's theory that constant change was the meaning of life and an essential component for humanity.

== Track listing ==
Side one

1. "Here to Go" (Go Mix Version) – 5:32
2. "Here to Go" (Here to Dub Version) – 5:44

Side two

1. "Shout" (LP version) – 3:15
2. "Shout" (E-Z Listening Version) – 4:15
- Both "Here to Go" remixes were reissued by Infinite Zero in 1995 as bonus tracks on the remastered and expanded Oh, No! It's Devo CD.

== Chart performance ==
Chart performance for "Here to Go"
Chart (1986)	Peak position
Australia (Kent Music Report)	40
US Hot Dance Music/Maxi-Singles Sales	44
