= Waldviertel Pyramid =

Coordinates: 48°34′32″N 15°03′41″E

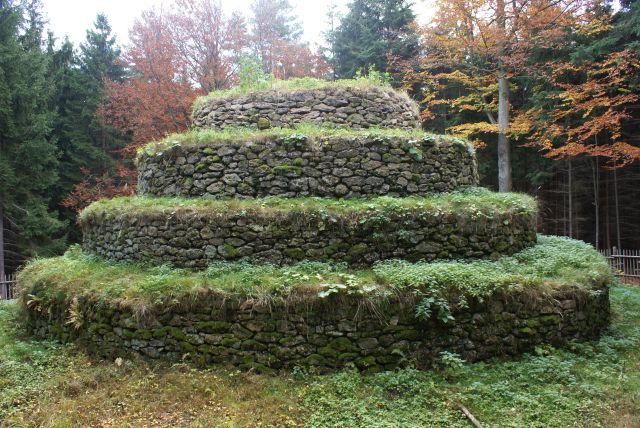
Waldviertel Pyramid, 2005

The Waldviertel Pyramid is a pyramid in Waldviertel, Lower Austria, Austria. It is hidden deep in the forest between Zwettl and Gross-Gerungs. It is the only known structure of its kind in Central Europe. It is of unknown age, and consists of four circular layers of loosely stacked natural stones. The diameter at the base is 14 metres (46 ft) and the height is 7 metres (23 ft). It has only been under official monument protection since 2001.

The original purpose of the pyramid is unknown. An interpretation as a Germanic place of worship or ancient tomb is unlikely because there was no prehistoric or early settlement of this area. An interpretation as medieval or more recent signalling station seems possible.

The elaborate construction seems to indicate a relatively modern design which could have been in an aristocratic situation – possibly part of a Baroque garden or park.

Because the remains of walls have been found nearby, it is possible that the pyramid was once part of a larger complex.

The Energy domes used by the rock band Devo resemble the Waldviertel Pyramid.
