= Energy dome =

Hat worn by American band Devo

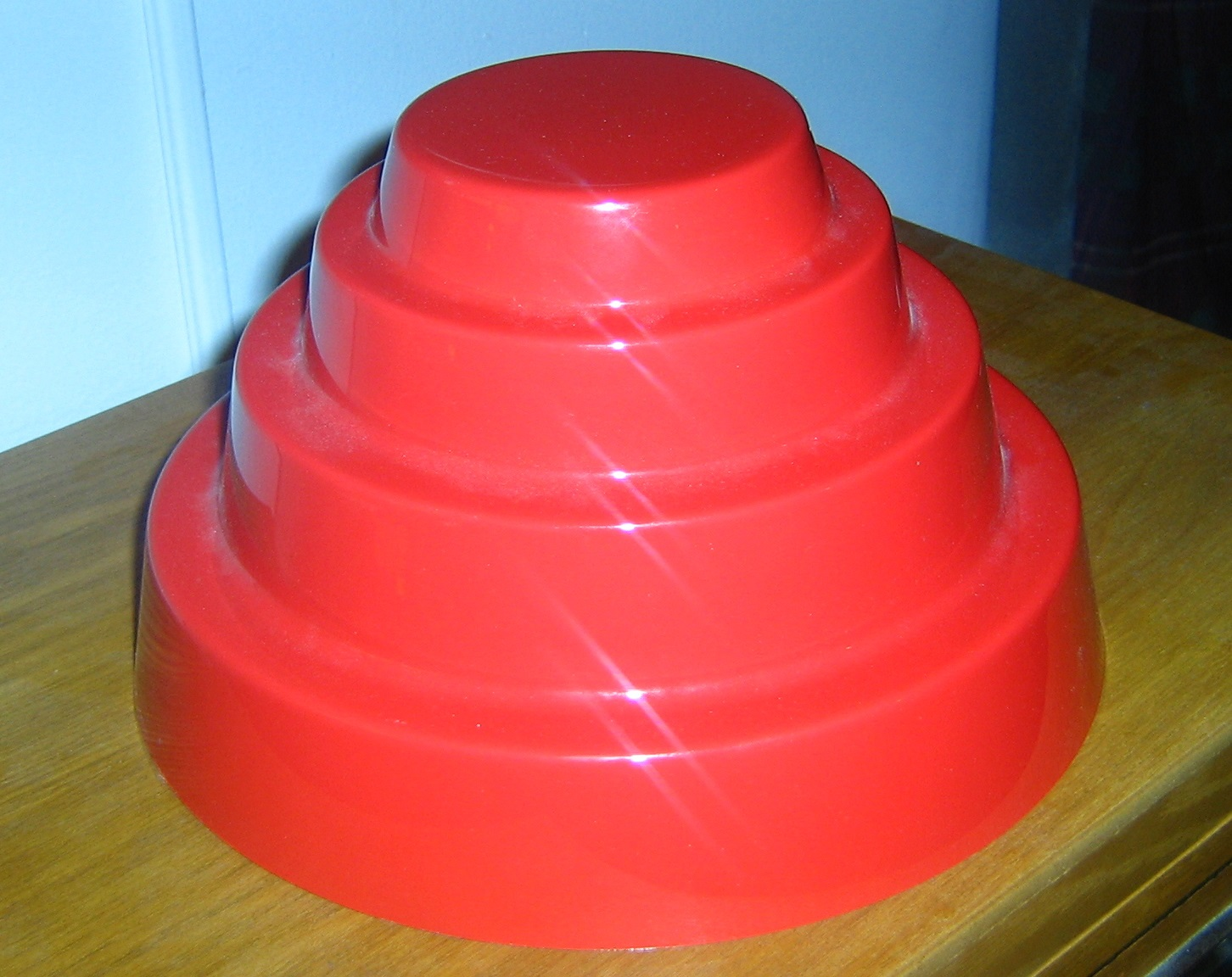
2008 energy dome manufactured by FDOS Design

An energy dome is a hat often worn by American new wave band Devo as part of the members' stage outfits. The dome was first worn during the band's Freedom of Choice campaign of 1980. It reappeared in the 1982, 1988, and 1990 tours, as well as most performances since 1997. The domes were custom made for the band from vacuum formed plastic, in a distinctive round, ziggurat shape, and are occasionally—and incorrectly—referred to as "power domes" or "flowerpots". The shape is also reminiscent of the Waldviertel Pyramid. When asked about the story behind the hats, lead vocalist Mark Mothersbaugh recounted:

We designed them, Jerry [Casale] and I. We were influenced both by German Bauhaus movement and geometric fashion, and Aztec temples. We just liked the look. It looked good, and it didn't look like any other bands out there. We weren't interested in wearing groovy hats or groovy clothing. We kind of looked like Lego toys or something by the time we got those on our heads, and that was a positive thing.

== Variants ==
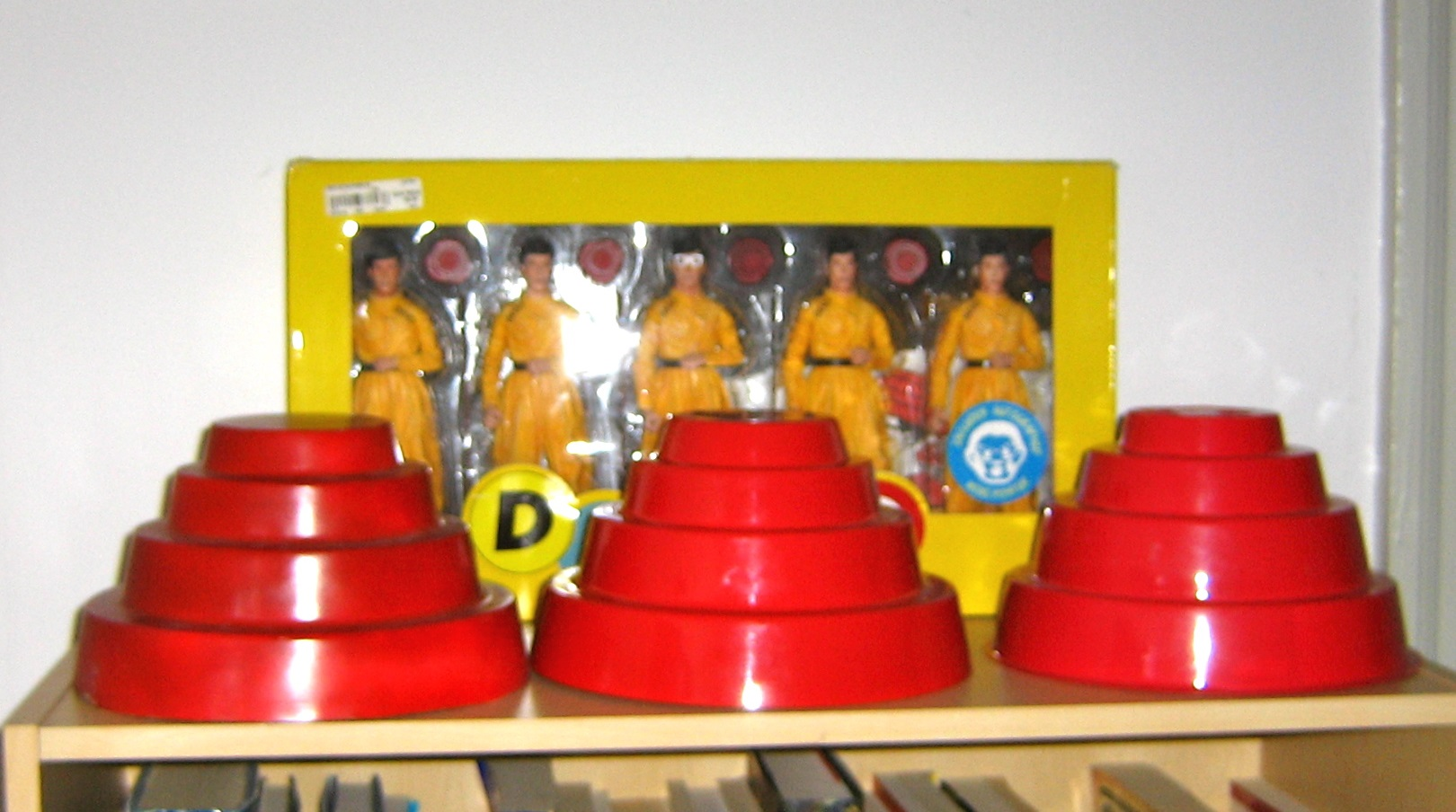
Three different models of Devo's energy dome: 1996 dome (left), 2008 FDOS Design dome (center), and 2005 Disguise dome (right), made from original Club Devo mold

Though the traditional energy dome is red, several variants of the dome have existed. Devo wore green energy domes while performing "Whip It" on Solid Gold in 1981. The band sported white domes in a 1984 Diet Coke advertisement. Silver chrome domes were worn by Devo in concert in 2002, made by covering a regular energy dome with metallic tape. In the music video for Devo's "Go Monkey Go", Mark Mothersbaugh can be seen wearing a white dome with a purple bottom tier. An appearance by Devo on the VH1 show TrueSpin featured charcoal gray domes. Devo also wore safety orange domes at the 2018 Burger Boogaloo performance, to match new orange jumpsuits. Assorted prototype and fan-made domes in a rainbow of colors also exist.

When Devo's keyboardist and rhythm guitarist Bob Casale died in 2014, his cremated remains were committed to a funerary urn in the shape of an energy dome.

=== Merchandise ===
Energy domes sold through Club Devo have come in several forms. The original Club Devo domes were of a smaller size than the stage-worn domes, with raised "DEVO" text on the top and a lip around the edge. This same mold was used again in 2005 for mass-produced energy domes sold as Halloween costumes. In 1996, Devo sold new energy domes that roughly matched the stage-worn model, though the new stage domes were slightly smaller than the original. The first versions of these domes were made of white plastic, spray-painted red. These were later replaced with domes made in a solid red plastic in 2004, manufactured by Chaser Shirts. In 2005, NECA Collectibles began manufacturing energy domes for Devo out of thin, off-color plastic. These were used until 2008 when a fan began custom manufacturing domes out of thick, red plastic for the band. The new domes revert to the dimensions of the original stage energy domes.

During the COVID-19 pandemic in 2020, a PPE version was available for sale with an attached face shield.

=== Blue domes ===
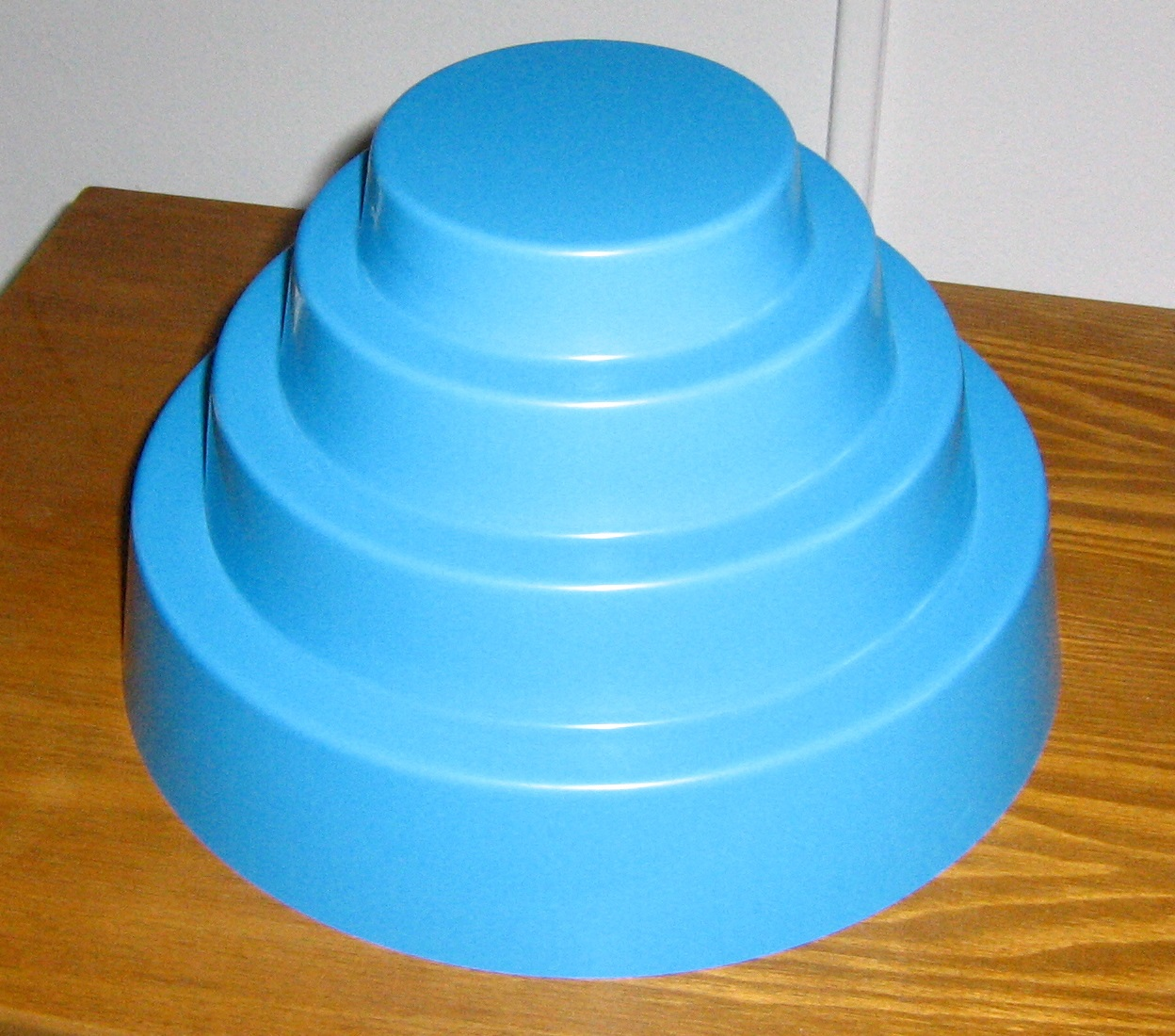
2010 Blue energy dome, manufactured by API

Dark blue domes were used for Devo's shows on the Nike-sponsored Run Hit Wonder race/concert in 2004.

Cyan blue domes were introduced in 2010 to promote Something for Everybody, Devo's ninth studio album. On February 22, 2010, at an appearance during the 2010 Winter Olympics in Whistler, British Columbia, blue domes were distributed to the audience and worn on stage. Blue domes were later put on sale in April 2010.

== Mythology ==
According to Gerald Casale on the Devo website:

It was designed according to ancient ziggurat mound proportions used in votive worship. Like the mounds it collects energy and recirculates it. In this case the Dome collects the Orgone energy that escapes from the crown of the human head and pushes it back into the Medulla Oblongata for increased mental energy. It's very important that you use the foam insert...or better yet, get a plastic hardhat liner, adjust it to your head size and affix it with duct tape or Super Glue to the inside of the Dome. This allows the Dome to "float" just above the cranium and thus do its job. Unfortunately, sans foam insert or hardhat liner, the recirculation of energy WILL NOT occur.

Devo claimed that their iconic energy dome design was used to recycle the wasted orgone energy that flows from a person's head. Devo co-founder Mark Mothersbaugh has said:

We did the red energy dome, which was useful—besides being an icon—it was a useful icon. You probably know this very well, but your orgone energy goes out the top of your head and it dissipates out the top, but if you wear an energy dome it recycles that energy. It comes back down and showers back down on you and, among other things, you remain manly, shall we say, for maybe another 150 years of your life, probably. I think that's a safe prediction to say that energy domes—if you wore them constantly, night and day—which I don't do, but there are people out there who do, not too many of them but there are some. We get e-mails from them, so we know they're out there, those people will probably live about an extra 150 years because of all that orgone energy that they're saving and not wasting away.

Casale stated that ornamentation in his childhood school St. Patrick School in Kent, Ohio, inspired their creation.
