= Devo Live =

Video by Devo
- Released: 2003
- Recorded: 1996
- Venue: Irvine Meadows Amphitheatre (Irvine, California)
- Genre: New wave

Devo chronology
The Essentials (2002)	Devo Live (2003)	Live in the Land of the Rising Sun (2004)

Devo Live is the fourth home video release by American new wave band Devo, and their second DVD. Devo Live contains an entire performance from their 1996 reunion tour (part of the Lollapalooza tour event), filmed at Irvine Meadows Amphitheatre in Irvine, California. It was released in 2003.

== Synopsis ==
The film details an entire live performance from Devo's 1996 reunion tour on Lollapalooza, opening for Metallica. The band performs a stripped down set consisting of songs from their first three albums. The band is in strong form and very energetic. However, the film itself has been criticized by fans for being poorly edited with rapid-fire cuts. Another criticism has been levelled at Rhino Records for their delays in producing the DVD and erroneous packaging.

== Track listing ==
- "Lolla Theme"
- "Whip It"
- "Girl U Want"
- "(I Can't Get No) Satisfaction"
- "Uncontrollable Urge"
- "Blockhead"
- "Mongoloid"
- "Jocko Homo"
- "Smart Patrol/Mr. DNA"
- "Gut Feeling/(Slap Your Mammy)"
- "Gates of Steel"
- "Come Back Jonee"
