= Theme from Doctor Detroit =

EP by Devo
- Released: April 1983
- Recorded: 1982–1983
- Genre: New wave; synth-pop
- Length: 12:46
- Label: MCA
- Producer: Devo

Devo chronology
| Oh, No! It's Devo (1982) | Theme from Doctor Detroit (1983) | Shout (1984) |

Theme from Doctor Detroit is an extended play (EP) by American new wave band Devo, released in 1983 by MCA Records. It includes the two songs from the Doctor Detroit film soundtrack recorded by the band (the title song and "Luv-Luv"), plus a dance mix of the title theme. A music video for the song, containing scenes from the movie as well as footage of the band, was released on the We're All Devo home video in 1984 and also appears on the 2014 re-release of The Complete Truth About De-Evolution video collection.

== Availability ==
The title track and "Luv-Luv" were both issued on the soundtrack album of the film, while the dance mix of the song was re-released on the compilation album, Pioneers Who Got Scalped: The Anthology (2000).

== Track listing ==
All tracks are written by Mark Mothersbaugh and Gerald Casale.

Side one

1. "Theme from Doctor Detroit" (Dance Mix) – 6:00

Side two

1. "Luv-Luv" – 3:36
2. "Theme from Doctor Detroit" – 3:10

== Chart performance ==
In the US, the "Theme from Doctor Detroit" made it to No. 50 on the Billboard Dance/Disco Top 80 chart. On the Hot 100, the song went to No. 59.

== Personnel ==
Devo

- Mark Mothersbaugh – lead vocals; keyboards
- Gerald Casale – lead and background vocals; bass guitar; keyboards
- Bob Casale – guitar; keyboards; backing vocals
- Bob Mothersbaugh – guitar; backing vocals
- Alan Myers – drums

Production

- Devo – producers
