= Song Study =

Song Study EP

EP by Devo
- Released: April 20, 2010
- Genre: New wave
- Label: Warner Bros.

Devo chronology
Watch Us Work It (2008)	Song Study EP (2010)

Song Study EP is an extended play album released by American new wave band Devo on April 20, 2010. It features the same track listing and cover art as the 12" single of "Fresh", with the addition of the Song Study Video.

== Track listing ==
1. "Fresh" – 2:59
2. "What We Do" – 3:17
3. "Song Study Video" – 2:03
