= Something for Everybody (Devo album) =

2010 album by Devo

Studio album by Devo
- Released: June 15, 2010
- Recorded: July 2007 – Mid-2009
- Studios: Mutato Muzika, West Hollywood, California
- Genres: New wave; synth-pop; post-punk
- Length: 37:50
- Label: Warner Bros.
- Producers: Greg Kurstin; John Hill; John King; Santi White; Devo; Money Mark

Devo chronology
Smooth Noodle Maps (1990)	Something for Everybody (2010)	Something Else for Everybody (2013)

Singles from Something for Everybody
- 1. "Watch Us Work It" Released: July 27, 2007; 2. "Don't Shoot (I'm a Man)" Released: April 10, 2009; 3. "Fresh" Released: February 27, 2010

Something for Everybody is the ninth studio album by American new wave band Devo. It was originally released in June 2010 (being their first studio album in two decades, since 1990's Smooth Noodle Maps) on their original label Warner Bros., and it was their first issued on that label since their sixth studio album Shout in 1984. The album was recorded between July 2007 and mid-2009, at Mutato Muzika, in West Hollywood, California. The album is the last Devo album to feature Bob Casale, who died in February 2014, and also first album with drummer Josh Freese.

The album cover depicts a woman the band refers to as the "Sexy Candy Dome Girl", portrayed by the Russian model and musician Natasha Romanova of the band Discrete Encounter, holding a miniature blue energy dome to her mouth.

== Background ==
Although a new Devo album had been considered as far back as the band's 1996 reunion, efforts by Devo's co-founder and bass guitarist Gerald Casale to get one off the ground were repeatedly unsuccessful. Devo produced some new material in the late 1990s and early 2000s, mostly for soundtracks and commercials, and toured regularly, but a new album had not been forthcoming. In interviews, Casale described the situation as "a cocoon of silence" and his solo project Jihad Jerry & the Evildoers was an attempt to spawn new Devo material. However, following the 2007 release of the non-album single "Watch Us Work It", Casale indicated that the band might be ready to work on a new album. That same year, LA Weekly, in an article on lead singer Mark Mothersbaugh's production studio Mutato Muzika, reported that, "After touring sporadically over the past decade but not releasing any new material, Devo are spending December at Mutato trying to create an album's worth of new material and contemplating a method of dispersal in the post-record-company world."

In a later interview, Mark Mothersbaugh revealed a song title from the in-progress album ("Don't Shoot (I'm a Man)"), but hopes were briefly deflated when Jerry stated that Mark had "killed the project" and that there would be no new Devo album. Casale eventually stated that Devo would "finish what we started" and later interviews confirmed that Devo would complete their new album. The "Studio Notes" section of the November 27 issue of Rolling Stone stated that "Devo are working on their first album of new material since 1990's Smooth Noodle Maps. 'We have about 17 songs we're testing out,' said Mark Mothersbaugh. 'We've already been contacted by 20 producers—including Snoop Dogg, Santigold, and Fatboy Slim.'" Fall 2009 was confirmed as a possible release date at the time.

== Promotion ==
Devo announced in early 2009 that they would be performing at the South by Southwest International Conference (SXSW) in Austin, Texas on March 20 with a warm-up show in Dallas on March 18. At these shows, Devo performed a new stage show utilizing synchronized video, similar to the technique they used for their 1982 tour. They also debuted new costumes and three new songs: "Don't Shoot (I'm a Man)", "What We Do" and "Fresh". All of these songs included a video backdrop, with the band performing in front.

On Friday, April 10, 2009, Devo debuted the music video for "Don't Shoot (I'm a Man)" on their website, through Vimeo. In an interview for the website "Subba-Cultcha", Casale stated that "regardless of the final [album] title, it will be 'Fresh'!" This statement led to speculation among fans that Fresh would be the new album's title. According to the "In the Studio" section of the June 2009 issue of Rolling Stone, the album was pushed back to 2010 to allow for "radical remixing".

In late 2009, Devo announced that it had signed a new contract with their original label, Warner Bros., to release their new album. In an interview with Gerald Casale in late October 2009, he announced that Devo's new album would be picking up from where they left off: "We think it's the best record that we'd ever done although we're not certain that Fresh will be the title. There are more good songs on this album than any other record that we've made. We're aiming for a spring release." In January 2010, Billboard published a preview of the upcoming album, stating that it would be released in April 2010. In the interview, it was stated that Casale hoped to call the album "Something for Everybody, despite the publicized working title of Fresh." The final track listing was still being decided but was likely to feature the high-energy (and "focus group-approved," according to Casale) "Please Baby Please" as well as tracks produced by Greg Kurstin and John Hill.

On January 17, 2010, it was announced that Devo would be performing on the second day of the 2010 Coachella Valley Music and Arts Festival in Indio, California. On February 22, 2010, Devo performed at one of the 2010 Winter Olympics victory ceremonies at Whistler Medals Plaza, in Canada. They returned to the SXSW conference in Austin, Texas on March 11 to conduct a panel titled "Devo, The Internet & You".

On April 17, 2010, the same day as both their Coachella performance and Record Store Day, Devo released a 12-inch vinyl single of "Fresh" backed with "What We Do". A sticker on the sleeve confirmed that the title of the new Devo album would be Something for Everybody. On April 20, Devo released the Song Study EP on iTunes, which contained the same tracks as the "Fresh" single, along with the addition of the "Song Study Video". That night, Devo performed "Fresh" and "Whip It" on Jimmy Kimmel Live!, where it was announced that the album would be released on June 15. For one week, beginning on June 10, the album was streamed online through Colbert Nation. Devo also performed "Fresh" on the Late Show with David Letterman on June 16, 2010.

== Release ==
Starting in early 2010, Devo began marketing the new album through a series of satirical videos and communiques from Greg Scholl, former CEO of music and video marketing and distribution company the Orchard, now billed as the Chief Operating Officer of "DEVO, INC." Devo also began working with a newly opened Los Angeles branch of New York City-based marketing group Mother New York to produce a number of videos designed to satirize the use of focus groups in marketing research and radio programming. The first of these was released in February to determine the new color for the band's famous energy dome headgear and asked participants what sound colors made and how they made them feel. Ultimately, blue was the color that was selected. Other videos used focus groups to arrive at conclusions like "'Fresh' alleviates aches and pains" and "3 out of 5 people would hold 'Fresh' with their feet for more than 3 minutes."

On February 22, "Fresh" was made available as a free download, following the band's performance at the 2010 Winter Olympics.

Devo returned to the SXSW conference in Austin, Texas on March 11, 2010, to conduct a panel entitled "Devo, The Internet & You". During this panel, a "focus group study" was conducted in which a total of four potential titles for the album were revealed: Fresh, Something for Everybody, Devolution and Excuse Our Mess. It was also announced at SXSW that Devo would be conducting a "Song Study", an interactive online survey created to determine the final 12 songs (out of 16 total) to be included on the new album. The survey ended on May 3, 2010, and the results were revealed on May 18, 2010, via Ustream at 12 p.m. Pacific Time. The track listing of the Song Study Version was announced.

On April 19, 2011, a video based on "What We Do" was released on Mashable's website. The video features an interactive 360° camera, which can be set on "auto pilot" or controlled by the viewer, allowing them to choose which part of the scenery to watch and to click on items to buy at the band's merchandise website. A non-interactive version was released to YouTube on April 20. The song "Human Rocket" was later featured in the U.S. trailer for the film Paul (2011).

In August 2012, Gerald Casale announced plans to release a collection of demos from the sessions for Something for Everybody, with potential titles being Devo Opens the Vault, Gems from the Devo Dumpster, or Something Else for Everybody.

== Critical reception ==
Professional ratings
Review scores
Source	Rating
AllMusic	3.5/5 stars
The Independent (Andy Gill)	4/5 stars
The Independent (Simon Price)	4/5 stars
The Times	4/5 stars
Rolling Stone	3.5/5 stars
Pitchfork	(6.6/10)
PopMatters	(4/10)

Barry Walters of Rolling Stone stated, "Combining the punk-funk fury of Devo's earliest recordings with synth pop, this ninth disc is frantic and wall-to-wall catchy", singling out "Human Rocket" as a highlight. Marc Masters of Pitchfork opined that while "The first few songs verge on self-parody [...] the rest of Something For Everybody contains some pretty good music--the kind that actually sneaks up on you a little rather than ham-fisting you over the head." While he felt the lyrics were "rife with clichés", "dated politics" and "self-conscious Devo-isms", he added that "when the band is locked in sonically, those lines sound better than they read", and ultimately compared the album favorably to Oh, No! It's Devo (1982). David Jeffries of AllMusic called the album a modern update of New Traditionalists (1981) combined with the hooks of Freedom of Choice (1980), comparing "Later Is Now" and "No Place Like Home" to the "sarcastic grandeur" of "Beautiful World". Citing "Fresh" and "Don't Shoot" as further highlights, Jeffries ultimately concluded that the album was "proudly not a nostalgia trip and is, instead, filled with age-appropriate subversion, right up to its ironic title."

Andy Fyfe of the BBC wrote, "Something for Everybody isn't a return to the halcyon days, but neither is it a deluded grasp for relevance". He selected "Fresh", "What We Do" and "Step Up" as highlights, but ultimately concluded the album was "an inconsistent world of quirk over content", noting that "their former sense of ironic fun seems to be slipping into bitterness." The Independent featured two reviews. Andy Gill noted, "pleasingly, at its best their punchy 'mechanized swing' electropop has lost none of its appeal since the masterful Freedom of Choice." Simon Price felt the album "exudes pure joy", adding, "The plantpot-headed sextet's comeback is the sound of bright brains having fun."

== Track listing ==
All tracks are written by Mark Mothersbaugh and Gerald Casale, except where noted.

No.	Title	Writer(s)	Producer(s)	Length
1.	"Fresh"		Greg Kurstin, John Hill, Santi White	3:02
2.	"What We Do"	Mark Mothersbaugh, Gerald Casale, Max Liederman	Kurstin	3:19
3.	"Please Baby Please"	G. Casale, Bob Casale	Kurstin	2:43
4.	"Don't Shoot (I'm a Man)"		Kurstin, Hill, White	3:28
5.	"Mind Games"		Kurstin	2:32
6.	"Human Rocket"	M. Mothersbaugh	Kurstin	3:25
7.	"Sumthin'"		Devo	2:48
8.	"Step Up"		Money Mark, John King, Andrew Clark^{[b]}	3:03
9.	"Cameo"		King, Clark^{[b]}	2:52
10.	"Later Is Now"	G. Casale	Kurstin	3:55
11.	"No Place Like Home"		Kurstin	3:21
12.	"March On"		Kurstin	3:53

Japanese version bonus track
No.	Title	Length
13.	"Watch Us Work It"	2:14

Digital deluxe version bonus tracks
No.	Title	Length
13.	"Watch Us Work It"	2:14
14.	"Signal Ready"	2:06
15.	"Let's Get to It"	2:56

iTunes deluxe version bonus track
No.	Title	Length
16.	"Knock Boots"	3:36

Song Study version

1. "Watch Us Work It"
2. "Fresh"
3. "Sumthin"
4. "Don't Shoot (I'm a Man)"
5. "Step Up"
6. "Signal Ready"
7. "What We Do"
8. "Please Baby Please"
9. "Let's Get to It"
10. "Mind Games"
11. "Later Is Now"
12. "Human Rocket"

At DEVOtional 2008, Mark Mothersbaugh indicated via a video conference that the already released "Watch Us Work It" might be included on the album. Three songs, all of which were performed at SXSW in March 2009, were confirmed for inclusion: "Fresh", "Don't Shoot" and "What We Do". At DEVOtional 2009, several new tracks were aired, including versions of the three songs performed at SXSW. A fifth song, "Step Up", was also played during a radio interview.

The following day of the press conference, the album was put up for pre-order through Club Devo with a different track listing than announced, noting that it was "88% focus group approved".

Further confusing the issue is an article and interview published in the Los Angeles Times on May 18, in which Gerald Casale reiterates that the final album will consist of the 12 songs voted on by fans. A posting on Devo's official website later explained the change in the track listing. It stated that "'March On' and 'No Place Like Home' were undervalued in the study" and that Devo felt they should be included. "Cameo" was also included due to the band's feelings that "it is the new Devo and will prevail in the end". It was later revealed that the album as determined by the Song Study would be released as an MP3 album available only through online retailers, while the physical CD release would have the "partnership-approved" track listing. The posting also announced the release of a deluxe edition with all 16 songs. It includes the four excluded tracks: "Signal Ready", "Let's Get to It", "Watch Us Work It", and "Knock Boots". The Japanese edition contains 13 tracks with "Watch Us Work It" as a bonus track. Only the iTunes version of Something For Everybody (Deluxe) contains the track "Knock Boots".

== Personnel ==
Devo

- Mark Mothersbaugh – vocals, synthesizers, programming
- Gerald Casale – vocals, bass guitar, bass synthesizers
- Bob Mothersbaugh – lead and rhythm guitars, backing vocals
- Bob Casale – rhythm guitar, programming, backing vocals
- Josh Freese – drums, additional percussion

Additional musicians

- Van Coppock – additional guitar ("Cameo", "No Place Like Home", "March On"); programming
- Jeff Friedl – additional drums

Technical

- Greg Kurstin – producer, mixer ("What We Do", "Please Baby Please", "Mind Games", "Human Rocket", "Later Is Now", "No Place Like Home", "March On"); co-producer, mixer ("Fresh", "Don't Shoot (I'm a Man)")
- John Hill – co-producer ("Fresh", "Don't Shoot (I'm a Man)")
- Santi White – co-producer ("Fresh", "Don't Shoot (I'm a Man)")
- John King – producer ("Cameo"); co-producer ("Step Up"); mixing ("Step Up", "Cameo")
- Mark Nishita – co-producer ("Step Up")
- Devo – producer ("Sumthin'")
- Bob Casale – mixing ("Sumthin'"); engineer
- Van Coppock – engineer
- Doug Boehm – additional engineering ("Fresh", "Don't Shoot (I'm a Man)")
- Paul Hager – additional recording, programming, engineering ("Fresh", "Don't Shoot (I'm a Man)", "Later Is Now", "Step Up")
- Josh Hager – additional programming, editing ("Fresh", "Don't Shoot (I'm a Man)", "Later Is Now", "Step Up")
- Andrew Clark – additional production ("Cameo", "Step Up")
- Mother Los Angeles – creative direction
- Joshua Dalsimer – photography
- Donny Phillips – design

== Something Else for Everybody ==
Something Else for Everybody

Compilation album by Devo
- Released: July 23, 2013
- Recorded: 2006–2009
- Studios: Mutato Muzika, West Hollywood, California
- Genres: New wave; electronic rock
- Length: 32:52
- Label: Booji Boy

Devo chronology
Something for Everybody (2010)	Something Else for Everybody (2013)	Hardcore Devo Live! (2015)

On July 23, 2013, Devo released Something Else for Everybody, a digital collection of eleven tracks from the Something for Everybody sessions that did not make the final album. The death of Alan Myers, Devo's third and most prominent drummer, came just a month before the release of the album. Something Else for Everybody was released on CD by Booji Boy Records on May 20, 2014.

=== Track listing ===
All tracks are written by Mark Mothersbaugh and Gerald Casale, except where noted.

No.	Title	Writer(s)	Length
1.	"Monsterman"		2:08
2.	"On the Inside"		2:27
3.	"Should-A Said Yes"		3:40
4.	"Think Fast"	Gerald Casale	3:16
5.	"Raise Your Hands"		2:47
6.	"Message of Hope"	G. Casale, Josh Freese	2:56
7.	"Big Dog"		3:05
8.	"Can U Juggle?"		2:48
9.	"Throw Money at the Problem"		3:13
10.	"I Luv Ur Gun"	G. Casale, Freese	2:49
11.	"Don't Shoot (I'm a Man)" (Polysics Remix)		3:43

== Charts ==
Chart (2010)	Peak position
Greek Albums (IFPI)	35
US Billboard 200	30
US Top Alternative Albums (Billboard)	5
US Top Rock Albums (Billboard)	8

== Tour ==
To promote the album, Devo embarked on their longest album-supported tour ever, lasting for nine legs from February 2010 until June 2013, playing in the United States, Canada, Australia and New Zealand. Following the conclusion of the tour, the only song from the album to be performed again would be "Don't Shoot (I'm a Man)", which was included in most shows after 2019. Some tour dates in 2012 included a performance of "Come Back Jonee" featuring Debbie Harry.

The last show took place on June 9, 2013, at the Natural History Museum in Los Angeles, featuring a one-off performance of an older song, "Jerkin' Back 'n' Forth". This tour marked the final time Bob Casale played with the band before his death in February 2014.
