= Mitt Romney dog incident =

21st century US political controversy

- The Romneys' Irish Setter, Seamus
- Date: June 1983
- Location: Romneys' station wagon en route from Belmont, Massachusetts to Beach O'Pines, Ontario
- First reporter: Reported by Neil Swidey in The Boston Globe in June 2007
- Participants: Mitt Romney; his wife, Ann Romney; their children; Seamus, the Romneys' pet dog

During a 1983 family vacation, American businessman and future politician Mitt Romney drove 12 hours with his dog on top of the car in a windshield-equipped carrier. This incident became the subject of negative media attention and political attacks on Romney in both the 2008 and the 2012 presidential elections.

== Road trip in 1983 ==
In June 1983, the Romney family left their Belmont, Massachusetts, home on their way to Romney's parents' cottage in Beach O' Pines, Ontario, for an annual vacation along the shore of Lake Huron. Their dog, Seamus, rode in a carrier on the roof of the family's Chevrolet Caprice station wagon for the 12-hour trip. Romney had built a windshield for the carrier to make the ride more comfortable for the dog. During the 650-mile (1,050 km) trip, Seamus got diarrhea. The Romneys were first alerted to the Irish Setter's bowel issues when son Tagg Romney noticed brown liquid pouring down the back window, followed immediately by him and his younger brothers yelling in disgust. Romney stopped at a gas station to wash the dog, the carrier, and the car. With Seamus back in the carrier, the family continued on their way.

== Seamus the dog ==
Seamus (/ˈʃeɪməs/ SHAY-məs), an Irish Setter, was an active, outgoing dog, and was the Romney family's first pet dog. It is generally reported that, a few years after his ride to Canada, Seamus was given to Mitt Romney's sister, Jane Romney Robinson of California, who said, "He kept ending up at the pound. They were worried about him getting hit crossing the street. We had more space, so he could roam more freely." The dog's date of death is unknown, but Robinson stated that Seamus lived to a "ripe old age" on her farm in California.

== Family response ==
When interviewed by Chris Wallace of Fox News, Romney stated that Seamus enjoyed being in the dog carrier, an "air-tight kennel", and that he was not aware of any violations of Massachusetts law; the state's animal cruelty laws prohibit anyone from carrying an animal "in or upon a vehicle, or otherwise, in an unnecessarily cruel or inhumane manner." In earlier accounts, Romney described a makeshift "windshield".

Ann Romney, Mitt Romney's wife, has stated that the news media exaggerated the severity of the incident, and compared traveling in the roof-top dog carrier to riding a motorcycle or riding in the bed of a pickup truck.

During an April 2012 interview with ABC News, Diane Sawyer asked the Romneys about Seamus and the road trip, and if he would ever do it again. Romney offered, "He loves it, it's his favorite." During the same interview, Ann Romney attributed Seamus' troubles to eating turkey off the table. Romney stated that he loved his dog.

== Other responses ==
In 2007, Ingrid Newkirk, president of People for the Ethical Treatment of Animals (PETA), criticized Romney for the incident. Responding to PETA, Romney said, "my dog likes fresh air".

Newkirk has elaborated (speaking for herself rather than for PETA) that the Seamus incident irritates her because "there are far more serious issues to talk about" regarding the mistreatment of animals.

In 2012, after a Dogs Against Romney protest outside the Westminster Kennel Club Dog Show, A veterinarian contacted by Slate about the plausibility of the Romneys' claim Seamus just had to defecate in his crate stated that "they (dogs) prefer clean environments; that's why one principle of crate training is to give them a space large enough to move around in but small enough that they don't want to defecate inside." The doctor added Seamus' loose stool was likely indicative of "high levels of stress."

During the 2012 U.S. Republican presidential primaries, candidate Newt Gingrich aired an anti-Romney attack ad that featured the story. While appearing on the ABC show This Week, Republican candidate Rick Santorum stated, "As far as Seamus the dog ... the issues of character are important in this election. We need to look at all those issues and make a determination as to whether that's the kind of person [Romney] you want to be president of the United States." Santorum's view was at odds with that of Bill Wasik, senior editor of Wired: "Yet looking back on the Seamus Romney story today, what is most striking is its forgettability, how indistinguishable it seems in retrospect from the idiots' parade of meaningless stories that came to define the [2008] campaign."

Journalists Mike Allen and Evan Thomas assert that Romney did nothing unusual: "Overlooked in the clucking over the incident is the fact that the dog was in a crate, probably little different from the dog kennels used to transport animals in the cold-storage compartments of airplanes. Romney had erected a barrier to shield the family pet from the wind. Romney, the family man, heading to the lake, didn't seem heartless at the time. But politics is a heartless business."

Ruth Marcus of The Washington Post defended Mitt Romney's treatment of Seamus, stating, "Doesn't the fact that Romney chose to bring the dog on the family vacation, rather than dump him in a kennel back home, suggest that he's a dog lover, not a hater?" Neil Swidey, the Boston Globe journalist who wrote the initial article about Romney's 1983 road trip, stated, "[Seamus] always struck me as a valuable window into how Romney operates. In everything the guy does, he functions on logic, not emotion."

A Public Policy Polling survey found that 74% of Democrats, 66% of independents, and 63% of Republicans considered it inhumane to put a family dog in a kennel on the roof of a car. The poll did not mention the windshield. The poll also found that 35% of voters would be less likely to vote for Romney because of the Seamus incident, whereas 55% of voters said that it would not affect how they vote. As of September 2012, New York Times columnist Gail Collins had mentioned the Romneys' car trip more than 70 times.

Responding to Democrats who emphasized the Seamus story, conservative bloggers such as Jim Treacher drew a comparison between the Seamus incident that occurred when Romney was a 36-year-old man, and Barack Obama sampling dog meat as a child in Indonesia, where it is a local delicacy, as mentioned in Obama's autobiography. While an Obama spokesman called it an attack on a small child, Obama himself has displayed a sense of humor about it. (Note: The White House Correspondents' Dinner saw Obama joking that Sarah Palin's stint guest hosting The Today Show reminded him of an old query: "What's the difference between a hockey mom and a pit bull? A pit bull is delicious." Delaney, Arthur; Stuart, Hunter (April 30, 2012). "Obama Ate Dog, and He'd Do It Again to Remind You of Seamus Romney". Huffington Post (Video).)

At the 2012 White House Correspondents' Association dinner, Obama poked fun at Romney releasing an "advertisement" depicting Romney and Seamus.

In 2012, the American musical group Devo released the single "Don't Roof Rack Me Bro (Seamus Unleashed)", dedicated to Seamus.

== See also ==
- List of individual dogs
