= Shout (Devo album) =

Studio album by Devo
- Released: October 8, 1984
- Recorded: July 1983 – February 1984
- Studio: Record Plant (Los Angeles)
- Genres: New wave; synth-pop
- Length: 32:48
- Label: Warner Bros.
- Producer: Devo

Devo chronology
Oh, No! It's Devo (1982)	Shout (1984)	Total Devo (1988)

Singles from Shout
- 1. "Are You Experienced?" Released: 1984; 2. "Here to Go" Released: 1985; 3. "Shout" Released: 1985

Shout is the sixth studio album by American new wave band Devo, released on October 8, 1984, by Warner Bros. Records.

The album developed the synth-pop sound of their previous few records, with an extensive focus on the then-new Fairlight CMI, Series IIx digital sampling synthesizer. Despite the popularity of synth-pop in 1984, the album was a critical and commercial failure, peaking at only No. 83 on the U.S. Billboard 200 and ultimately leading to Warner Bros. dropping the band from their label.

Shout was recorded during a period of creative differences, and tensions rose within the band. Several of the band members have since stated that they were not satisfied with the completed album and Devo subsequently went on hiatus for four years following its release. Additionally, Alan Myers, who had played drums for the band since 1976, departed after the release of the album, citing a lack of creative fulfillment stemming from the band's increasing use of drum machines and programming. Although Devo would go on to release two further studio albums through Enigma Records, they would not release another studio album through Warner Bros. until their ninth album, Something for Everybody (2010).

== Production ==
Shout was recorded over a period of ten months between July 1983 and February 1984, in sessions that took place at the Record Plant in Los Angeles, California.

Over the course of their career, Devo had been transitioning away from using analog synthesizers. Shout made extensive use of digital equipment such as the Fairlight CMI, as well as the LinnDrum, Emulator and the Synclavier II. Mark Mothersbaugh enjoyed the process of sampling real instruments, as well as blending acoustic samples from the Fairlight CMI's factory preset library with the band's synthesizer tracks. As such, the compositional process for the band became more insular for him.

Gerald Casale has stated that Mothersbaugh purchased the Fairlight CMI with band money and introduced it into the sessions, and that Casale reluctantly agreed to its use because he'd heard that Depeche Mode had used one. After some experimentation, Casale and other band members were dissatisfied with the results, so he suggested centering the album on the use of bass, drums and guitar, reserving the Fairlight CMI for sequencer lines, "scary sounds" and "abstract element[s]". Mothersbaugh eventually rejected this idea, and as a result, Casale began withdrawing from the sessions.

"Here to Go" was inspired by British-Canadian artist Brion Gysin's theory that constant change was the meaning of life and an essential component for humanity. Warner Bros. initially rejected the album and asked that the band include a cover version, with Casale suggesting the Jimi Hendrix Experience's "Are You Experienced?".

Shout was the final studio album by the 1976–1985 line-up of Devo, with their third and most prominent drummer, Alan Myers, leaving the band shortly after the album's release. According to the book We Are Devo, Myers cited a lack of creative fulfillment as his reason for leaving the band, something that he had felt since Devo's move to Los Angeles in the late 1970s. Devo's increased use of drum machines and electronics through the years had greatly reduced Myers' role in the band, although Casale has said that he begged Myers not to leave.

In a 2007 interview with Billboard magazine, Casale stated that Shout was the biggest regret of his career, "because the Fairlight just kind of took over everything on that record. I mean, I loved the songwriting and the ideas, but the Fairlight kind of really determined the sound." According to a 2005 interview with the band's guitarist, Bob Mothersbaugh, "Mark and Jerry kept saying in interviews that the guitar was obsolete and wanted to prove it with the Shout album." In 2016, Casale, in response to a question from a fan on Twitter, stated that recording the album was even "too painful to talk about."

In 2025, Mark Mothersbaugh stated that "I don’t think any of us feel like we love it", adding that "by the time we got to Shout, me and Bob Casale were the only ones that were showing up for rehearsal and writing".

== Artwork and packaging ==
The album's cover photograph, taken by Karen Filter, is a head shot of Timothy Leary's son Zachary Leary (credited as Zachary Chase) on a composite background with his left hand raised by his open mouth in a "shout" gesture. The album's back cover depicts a head shot photo of guitarist Bob Mothersbaugh's daughter Alex with her eyes focused upwards and her left hand raised by her ear in a listening gesture. It is notably their first studio album since 1978's Q: Are We Not Men? A: We Are Devo! not to feature any of the band's members on the outside cover.

As with every Devo studio album, the band developed a new look for the album, eschewing the black T-shirts and slacks with white "Spud Ring" collars of the Oh, No! It's Devo (1982) period and replacing them with "Chinese—American Friendship Suits."

== Promotion ==
The band was allotted $50,000 to make a music video for "Are You Experienced?". However, the band drew criticism that the video, which featured white Hendrix impersonator Randy Hansen emerging from a coffin, was "tasteless" and "disrespectful", which did not aid the album's reception. As a result, the band did not tour to promote the album, leading Warner Bros. to ultimately offer a termination of the band's new six-album contract in exchange for $250,000.

Despite being one of Devo's most visually complex and expensive music videos, "Are You Experienced?" wasn't included on the 2003 DVD music video collection The Complete Truth About De-Evolution (although it had been included on the LaserDisc of the same title issued in 1993). In an interview with Gerald Casale for Ear Candy, he explained:

E.C.: Speaking of de-evolution, why didn't the Hendrix estate give you permission to put the "Are You Experienced?" video on the DVD?

Gerald Casale: Further de-evolution. You understand that the consortium of people that now represent the Hendrix estate are basically run by lawyers; the lawyer mentality. Lawyers always posit the worst-case scenarios. Though that video was loved for years by anybody who saw it including the man who commissioned it —Chuck Arroff, a luminary in the music business, who still claims to this day that it was one of his five most favorite videos ever—, they [the lawyers] didn't get it and assumed we were making fun of Jimi. That's like saying "Whip It" makes fun of cowboys. This is so stupid it's unbelievable.

== Critical reception ==
Professional ratings
Review scores
Source	Rating
AllMusic	1.5/5 stars
Robert Christgau	C

Writing for The Village Voice, music journalist Robert Christgau stated, "Marking time (actually, a computer marks it for them), they create the rock—no, new wave—equivalent of baseball's 'Play me or trade me.' I played it. Now I'm trading it."

Mark Deming of AllMusic retrospectively called it a "forgettable, slick and glossy product with all human surfaces stripped away."

== Track listing ==
All tracks are written by Mark Mothersbaugh and Gerald Casale, except where noted.

Side one
No.	Title	Writer(s)	Length
1.	"Shout"		3:15
2.	"The Satisfied Mind"		3:07
3.	"Don't Rescue Me"	Mark Mothersbaugh	3:07
4.	"The 4th Dimension"		4:24
5.	"C'mon"		3:15

Side two
No.	Title	Writer(s)	Length
1.	"Here to Go"		3:18
2.	"Jurisdiction of Love"	M. Mothersbaugh	3:00
3.	"Puppet Boy"		3:10
4.	"Please Please"		3:04
5.	"Are You Experienced?"	Jimi Hendrix	3:08
Total length:			32:48

== Personnel ==
Credits adapted from Pioneers Who Got Scalped: The Anthology (2000) CD liner notes:

Devo

- Mark Mothersbaugh – vocals, keyboards, guitar
- Gerald Casale – vocals, bass guitar, keyboards
- Bob Mothersbaugh – lead guitar, vocals
- Bob Casale – rhythm guitar, keyboards, vocals
- Alan Myers – drums

Credits adapted from the original album's liner notes:

Technical

- Devo – producer, graphic concept
- Bob Casale – engineer
- Ed Delena – assistant engineer
- Mike Shipley – mixing (tracks 1–9)
- Steve Marcussen – mastering
- Jim Mothersbaugh – technical assistance
- Will Alexander – programming consultation
- Al Horvath – additional Emulator programs
- Bill Wolfer – additional Emulator programs
- Vigon Seireeni – art direction
- Karen Filter – photography
- Effective Graphics – computer graphics
- Zachary Chase – cover kid (boy)
- Alex Mothersbaugh – cover kid (girl)
- Clacton and Frinton – Devo's Chinese—American Friendship Suits

== Charts ==
Chart (1984)	Peak position
Canada Top Albums/CDs (RPM)	92
US Billboard 200	83

== See also ==
- List of albums released in 1984
- Devo's discography
