= Jihad Jerry & the Evildoers =

American solo music project

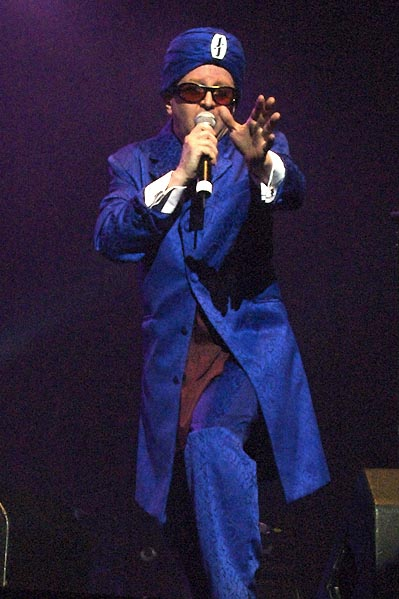
- "Jihad Jerry" (Gerald Casale) performing with Devo in San Francisco, 2006

Background information
- Origin: U.S.
- Genres: Alternative
- Years active: 2005–2006; 2021
- Label: Cordless Recordings
- Spinoff of: Devo
- Members: Gerald Casale; Bob Mothersbaugh; Mark Mothersbaugh; Bob Casale; Josh Freese; Steve Bartek; Josh Hager; Geri Lynn; Alex Brown; Dave Schulz
- Website: geraldvcasale.com

Jihad Jerry & the Evildoers is the solo project of American musician Gerald Casale, best known as a founding member of the new wave band Devo. Jihad Jerry also includes contributions from fellow Devo members Mark Mothersbaugh, Bob Mothersbaugh and Bob Casale, Jerry's brother. It also features drummer Josh Freese, who had toured with Devo before becoming a member of the band.

Jihad Jerry & the Evildoers play in a hard, blues-influenced style. Their debut album includes newly recorded versions of several songs from the Hardcore Devo-era of Devo's recordings. The band released a three-song EP through the iTunes Music Store and other music download services titled Army Girls Gone Wild on November 8, 2005. A full-length album, Mine Is Not a Holy War, was released via iTunes on August 22, 2006, and in stores by Cordless Recordings on September 12. A new single and music video, "I'm Gonna Pay U Back", was released on July 9, 2021.

== Promotion ==
The biography Casale created for Jihad Jerry is as follows:

Jihad Jerry was born in Tehran, Iran while the Shah of Iran was still in power. His father was an Iranian barber and his mother was an Irish-American midwife. He attended a private co-ed school in the region where he earned good grades. Even foreigners took notice of young Jihad and he received an academic scholarship to the University of North Pittsburgh. However, he was not able to leave Iran to attend, due to the recent revolution in 1979 led by the Ayatollah Khomeini. He then found work as a rug salesman. Unable to finish his education and trapped in a theocracy which he thought of as narrow-minded and sexually segregated, Jihad declared war on the prejudice and ignorance that had so wronged him. Music became his weapon. Eventually, he earned enough money to flee from Iran and settle in Yonkers, New York. There he had little success putting together a band. After the terrorist attacks on September 11, Jihad Jerry found new meaning to his message: "the enemy is not the Muslim, the Christian, or the Jew, but stupidity itself". His band "Jihad Jerry and the Evildoers" was soon formed.

The project received little promotion beyond a music video for the song "Army Girls Gone Wild." Jihad Jerry performed at several shows near the end of Devo's 2006 tour, performing the song "Beautiful World," and occasionally appeared with other bands.

In a 2007 interview with the website Battery in Your Leg, Casale stated, "People are kind of freaked out by the Jihad Jerry stuff. I thought they'd all think it was really funny and get off on it but people are really offended and scared...I think that's it. I don't want them to have Jihad Jerry to kick around anymore!".

== Resurgence ==
On March 29, 2021, it was announced via YouTube that Casale would be releasing new music for Record Store Day 2021. On April 12, it was clarified that this would commence with a vinyl reissue of Mine Is Not a Holy War on June 12, now attributed to "DEVO's Gerald V. Casale" and titled A K A Jihad Jerry & the Evildoers. This release would include a new track, "I'm Gonna Pay U Back", featuring Oingo Boingo guitarist Steve Bartek. This was followed by a further announcement on May 16 that a vinyl 7-inch of "I'm Gonna Pay U Back", as well as an expanded edition CD of the album featuring five bonus tracks (including "I'm Gonna Pay U Back"), was released July 9, 2021. A music video for "I'm Gonna Pay U Back" was premiered by Rolling Stone magazine on July 8, 2021.

== Discography ==
=== Army Girls Gone Wild (2005) ===
First released November 8, 2005, the EP and its content was available only by download. It contained early mixes of three songs that would later be included on the final full album Mine Is Not a Holy War.

1. "Army Girls Gone Wild" (Gerald V. Casale, Peter Gregg) – 2:50
2. "Beehive" (G. Casale, Gregg) – 3:11
3. "The Owl" (G. Casale) – 3:01

=== Mine Is Not a Holy War (2006) ===
First released on August 22, 2006, via download through iTunes. On September 12, 2006, it was released on CD by Cordless Recordings. The album featured remixed versions of the EP songs, as well as four reworked and re-recorded Devo songs: "Beehive", "I Been Refused", "Find Out" and "I Need a Chick". The album also features a cover of the Yardbirds' "He's Always There". "If the Shoe Fits" was previously heard earlier that year on the CD by Devo 2.0 under the title "The Winner", featuring significantly different lyrics.

1. "The Time Is Now" (G. Casale) – 2:59
2. "Army Girls Gone Wild" (G. Casale, Gregg) – 2:48
3. "Danger" (G. Casale, Robert Casale) – 2:54
4. "Beehive" (G. Casale, Gregg) – 3:08
5. "I Been Refused" (G. Casale, Gregg) – 2:25
6. "The Owl" (G. Casale) – 3:05
7. "What's in a Name?" (G. Casale) – 3:29
8. "If the Shoe Fits" (G. Casale, Mark Mothersbaugh) – 2:18
9. "All She Wrote" (G. Casale) – 2:53
10. "Find Out" (G. Casale, Mothersbaugh) – 2:52
11. "He's Always There" (Jim McCarty, Paul Samwell-Smith) – 2:24
12. "I Need a Chick" (G. Casale, Gregg) – 3:19

2021 Record Store Day LP edition bonus track

13. "I'm Gonna Pay U Back"

2021 Expanded Edition CD bonus tracks

13. "Pieces of Joe" (Unreleased Demo)
14. "Huboon Stomp" (Previously Unreleased)
15. "I'm Gonna Pay U Back"
16. "I'm Gonna Pay U Back" (Instrumental)
17. "The Manifesto" (Previously Unreleased)
