= Total Devo =

Studio album by Devo
- Released: May 24, 1988
- Recorded: 1987–1988
- Studios: Devo (Marina del Rey); Master Control (Burbank)
- Genres: Dance-pop; synth-pop
- Length: 41:30
- Label: Enigma
- Producer: Devo

Devo chronology
Shout (1984)	Total Devo (1988)	Now It Can Be Told: Devo at the Palace (1989)

Singles from Total Devo
- 1. "Disco Dancer" Released: 1988; 2. "Baby Doll" Released: 1988

Total Devo is the seventh studio album by American new wave band Devo, released in 1988 by Enigma Records. "Disco Dancer" hit No. 45 on Billboard's Hot Dance Club Play chart for the week of September 3, 1988.

== Background ==
Following the release of Devo's sixth studio album, Shout (1984), the band's label, Warner Bros., still had the band contracted to provide two more albums. After the commercial failure of Shout, Warner Bros. contacted Devo's manager Elliot Roberts and made an offer to terminate the arrangement, which they accepted, but by 1987, the band still had no new contract. Enigma Records co-owners Bill and Wesley Hein, who'd had a huge success with Stryper, had received a $50 million cash infusion and wanted to sign Devo to a two-record deal, and when Roberts left the band, they accepted the deal.

Longtime drummer Alan Myers also left at this time and was replaced by David Kendrick, who had previously worked with Devo's Bob Casale. Kendrick later stated that he played live drums on both Total Devo and its follow up, Smooth Noodle Maps (1990), and that Myers had left Devo due to the band's increasing reliance on drum machines. Devo composed and rehearsed Total Devo in a rented warehouse in Culver City, California, returning to using a live drum kit.

== Composition ==
"Disco Dancer" was inspired by an Indian music video in which a man doing "exaggerated macho dances" declares "I'm a disco! Yeah, I'm a disco!"

"Some Things Never Change" interpolates a lyric from the Beatles' "A Day in the Life" and appeared in Interplay's computer adventure game, Neuromancer, itself an adaptation of the 1984 novel of the same name by William Gibson.

"The Shadow" has lyrics that contain numerous references to literary works such as the Strange Case of Dr Jekyll and Mr Hyde. The chorus is partially lifted from T. S. Eliot's poem "The Hollow Men" and it incorporates and paraphrases the catchphrase from the serials following the character the Shadow ("Who knows what lurks in the hearts of men?/The shadow knows!").

== Production ==
Total Devo was recorded between 1987 and 1988, with the basic tracks recorded at Devo Studios in Marina del Rey and the additional tracks at Master Control in Burbank. Devo member Gerald Casale later described the production as "sparse" and "back to basics". However, like its predecessor, Shout, the album once again makes use of digital equipment, including a LinnDrum and Roland D-50. Accounts differ as to whether or not the band returned to using a Fairlight CMI on Total Devo, after having used it extensively on Shout.

The cover photograph is based on an early promotional photo by Devo from 1977. For the silhouette photo on the back cover, the band members posed naked, in a spoof of Prince's Lovesexy album art.

The caption on the front cover has changed depending on the number of tracks contained in each release. The cover of the original vinyl release included the caption "11 digital cartoons from the de-evolution band," while the original CD release, which included two additional tracks, was captioned "13 digital cartoons from the de-evolution band." A cassette release was captioned "12 digital cartoons..." and the Restless Records re-release is captioned with "16 digital cartoons...". The 2018 Futurismo release simply says "Digital cartoons...", and the 2025 streaming release contains no caption.

== Promotion ==
Two music videos were made for the album's second single, "Disco Dancer", both using remixed versions of the track by producer Ivan Ivan. The videos are similar, but the 12-inch mix video has additional footage, including a topless woman, and was only on promotional VHS tapes distributed to nightclubs.

The video was shot on Super 8 film in Los Angeles and New York City. Casale later stated that the video first aired on MTV's "Smash or Trash?", in which a video was aired and viewers would call in and vote on it, and was subsequently "trashed", with MTV refusing to air it again. Casale added that he felt the video's failure was due to the audio being out of phase, removing the bass and drums.

"Baby Doll" was used that same year in the comedy film Tapeheads, with newly recorded Swedish lyrics, and was credited to (and shown in a music video by) a fictitious Swedish band called Cube-Squared.

Total Devo was the only Devo album to be released on DAT in addition to the standard releases on vinyl, cassette and CD. The tour for the album was chronicled on the 1989 live album Now It Can Be Told: Devo at the Palace.

== Reissue ==
In 2018, Futurismo Inc. issued a two-disc deluxe edition of Total Devo, on both CD and vinyl formats. The double CD set comes housed in a digipak while the double LP comes in three vinyl color variations. Both formats include gatefold sleeves with spot gloss logos and shapes, a fold-out poster and liner notes from band member Gerald Casale.

== Critical reception ==
Professional ratings
Review scores
Source	Rating
AllMusic	1.5/5 stars
Robert Christgau	C+
Rolling Stone	1/5 stars

Village Voice critic Robert Christgau awarded the album a C+ grade, noting its "retro-electro sheen". Michael Azerrad of Rolling Stone magazine awarded the album one star out of five, dismissing it as "a desperate SOS from main writer Mark Mothersbaugh." Of "Baby Doll", Cashbox said, "this terribly unimaginative (by their standards) single is trying to be commercial."

In a retrospective review, Steve Huey of AllMusic said Total Devo found the band to be "no longer innovative and not incredibly compelling."

== Track listing ==
All tracks are written by Mark Mothersbaugh and Gerald Casale, except where noted.

No.	Title	Writer(s)	Length
1.	"Baby Doll"		3:56
2.	"Disco Dancer"		4:14
3.	"Some Things Never Change"		4:12
4.	"Plain Truth"		3:13
5.	"Happy Guy"		3:26
6.	"Don't Be Cruel"	Otis Blackwell	2:10
7.	"The Shadow"		3:25
8.	"I'd Cry If You Died"		4:05
9.	"Agitated"		3:53
10.	"Man Turned Inside Out"	M. Mothersbaugh	4:18
11.	"Sexi Luv"		3:14
12.	"Blow Up"	M. Mothersbaugh, Bob Casale, Bob Mothersbaugh	4:38
13.	"Some Things Never Change (Cassette Version)"		5:19
Total length:			41:30

- Track 11 not included on vinyl release of the album.
- Track 13 included on first CD version, DAT version, and subsequent CD releases.

== Personnel ==
Credits adapted from Pioneers Who Got Scalped: The Anthology CD liner notes:

Devo

- Mark Mothersbaugh – vocals, keyboards, guitar
- Gerald Casale – vocals, bass guitar, keyboards
- Bob Mothersbaugh – lead guitar, vocals
- Bob Casale – rhythm guitar, keyboards, vocals
- David Kendrick – drums

Credits adapted from the original album's liner notes:

Additional musicians

- Greta Greta – backing vocals on "Plain Truth"
- Nan Vernon – backing vocals on "Plain Truth"
- Steve Lindsay – bass sample on "Disco Dancer"

Technical

- Devo – producer
- Bob Casale – engineer
- Ted Pattison – assistant engineer
- Gerald Casale – graphic concepts, art direction, World Service uniforms
- Mark Mothersbaugh – graphic concepts, art direction, World Service uniforms
- Rocky Schenck – photography
- Robert Mothersbaugh – Amiga computer graphics
- Muto-little – uniform fabrication
- Patrick Pending – layout, design
- Jim Mothersbaugh – Roland equipment, technical collaboration

== Charts ==
Chart (1988)	Peak position
US Billboard 200	189
