= Watch Us Work It =

Single by Devo

from the album Something for Everybody
- Released: July 27, 2007
- Genre: New wave
- Length: 2:13
- Songwriters: Mark Mothersbaugh and Gerald Casale
- Producer: Teddybears

Devo singles chronology
"Post Post-Modern Man" (1990)	"Watch Us Work It" (2007)	"Don't Shoot (I'm a Man)" (2009)

Alternative covers

"Watch Us Work It" is a single by the US new wave band Devo, produced by Teddybears. It was originally released on July 27, 2007, and was featured in a commercial for Dell. It was subsequently re-released, on vinyl, in December 2008. The song was included on the deluxe version of the band's ninth studio album Something for Everybody, which was released on June 15, 2010. The song features a sample drum track from "The Super Thing" from Devo's 1981 album New Traditionalists.

The band announced in a July 23, 2007, MySpace bulletin that a full-length music video would be created, and the song itself is now available on iTunes and eMusic. Gerald Casale said that this song was chosen from a batch that the band was working on. The music video was released in September 2007, directed by Jonas Åkerlund, and is an extended version of the Dell commercial, without product shots. The song appears in the video game Dance Dance Revolution Universe 3.

MVD Audio announced a vinyl maxi-single of "Watch Us Work It" for release in 2008. Released on December 9, 2008, it contains three previously unreleased versions of the song, and a remix of The Attery Squash song "Devo Was Right About Everything" by the band. It is the first physical single released by Devo since "Post Post-Modern Man" in 1990.

A music video of the "Still Workin' Mix" featuring the band, without drummer Josh Freese, appeared on the Nickelodeon TV show Yo Gabba Gabba! in March 2010.

== Track listing ==
12" vinyl single

1. "Watch Us Work It" (Teddybears mix) – 2:14
2. "Watch Us Work It" (Original demo) – 2:18
3. "Watch Us Work It" (Karaoke Mix) – 3:12
4. "Watch Us Work It" (Still Workin' Mix) – 4:19
5. "Devo Was Right About Everything" by The Attery Squash (The Devo Mix) – 3:05

Digital download

1. "Watch Us Work It" – 2:13
