= Gerald Casale =

American musician (born 1948)

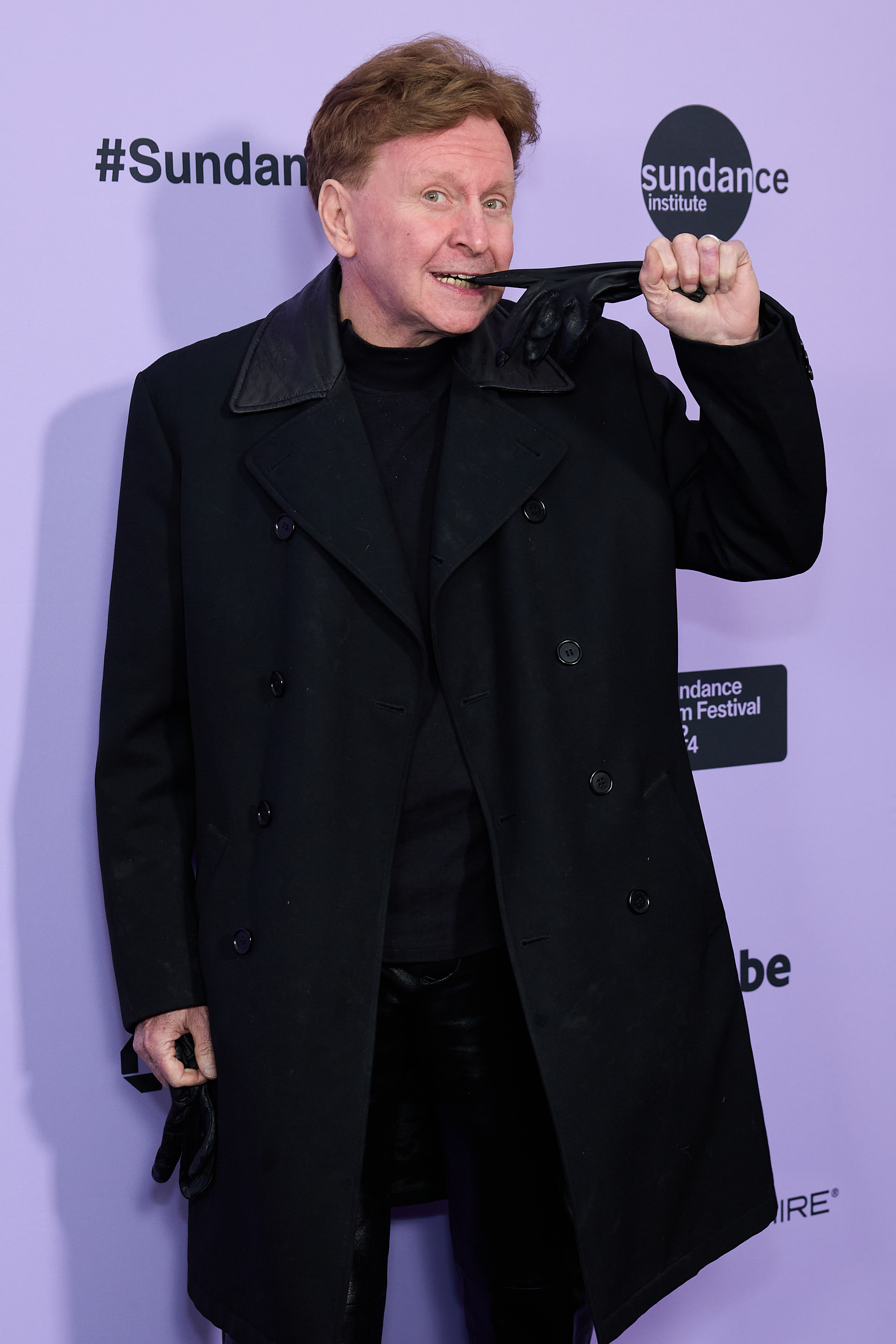
- Casale at the premiere of the documentary film Devo at the 2024 Sundance Film Festival

Background information
- Also known as: Jerry
- Born: Gerald Vincent Pizzute; July 28, 1948 (age 78); Ravenna, Ohio, U.S.
- Genres: New wave; punk rock; post-punk; electropunk; art punk; synth-pop; electronic rock
- Occupations: Musician; singer; songwriter; composer; record producer
- Instruments: Vocals; bass guitar; synthesizer; guitar
- Years active: 1972–present
- Labels: Cordless; X Production; MVD Entertainment Group
- Member of: Devo; Jihad Jerry & the Evildoers
- Formerly of: The Numbers Band
- Website: geraldvcasale.com

Gerald Vincent Casale (/kəˈsɔːliː/ kə-SAW-lee) (né Pizzute; born July 28, 1948) is an American musician. He came to prominence in the late 1970s as co-founder, co-lead vocalist and bass player of the new wave band Devo, which released a top 20 hit in 1980 with the single "Whip It". Casale is the main lyricist and one of the primary composers of Devo's music, as well as the director of most of the band's music videos. He is one of only two members (along with lead singer and keyboardist Mark Mothersbaugh) who have been with Devo throughout its entire history. Bob, Casale's brother, also performed with the band until his death in 2014.

Casale pursued a solo career in 2005 while still a member of Devo with the project Jihad Jerry & the Evildoers. The project received little promotion beyond a music video for the single "Army Girls Gone Wild". Jihad Jerry appeared at several shows near the end of Devo's 2006 tour, performing the song "Beautiful World". He has also performed occasionally with other bands.

Casale has also directed music videos for other recording artists, including the Cars ("Touch and Go", "Panorama"), Rush ("Mystic Rhythms", "Superconductor"), A Perfect Circle ("Imagine"), Foo Fighters ("I'll Stick Around"), Soundgarden ("Blow Up the Outside World") and Silverchair ("Freak", "Cemetery"), among others.

== Early life ==
Gerald Vincent Pizzute was born on July 28, 1948, in Ravenna, Ohio. He was born with the last name Pizzute because his father, Bob, had legally changed his name (his birth name having been Robert Edward Casale) to that of his foster parents. Four years after Gerald's birth, his father changed his name back to his birth name. Gerald Casale grew up in Kent, Ohio and graduated from Theodore Roosevelt High School in 1966.

== Career ==
=== The Numbers Band and Devo ===
Prior to Devo, Casale had played bass guitar with The Numbers Band. He caused friction in the band by suggesting that they should incorporate advertising jingles and other "low culture" elements into their music. After leaving the Numbers Band and graduation, Casale attended Kent State University, majoring in art (focusing on fine/performing arts and fashion-related studies). In the late 1960s, he was a self-described hippie until the May 4, 1970, shootings. Being involved with Freshman orientation at the KSU Honors College, he personally knew two of the victims, Jeffrey Miller and Allison Krause, and was near Krause when she was shot. Casale described that day in multiple interviews as being "the day I stopped being a hippie". Together with Bob Lewis, Casale used the shooting as a catalyst to develop the concept of De-evolution, forming the band Devo in 1973. Casale has said that David Bowie's 1974 album Diamond Dogs and its subsequent tour inspired him to "raise the bar" for his work with Devo, stating, "I had seen what it takes to combine theater, concept and music in a three-stage rocket to mind-blowing effect."

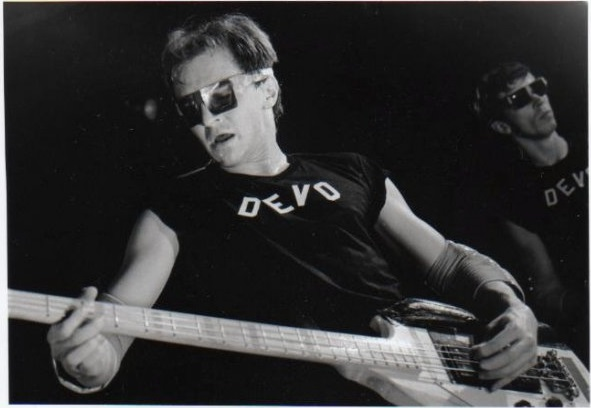
Casale performing live with Devo in 1978

Initially featuring Casale (bass), Mark Mothersbaugh (vocals), and Mark's brothers Bob (lead guitar) and Jim (electronic drums), the band eventually solidified around the lineup of Casale, his brother Bob (second guitarist), Mark and Bob Mothersbaugh, and drummer Alan Myers. On October 14, 1978, Devo appeared on American variety show Saturday Night Live to promote their debut album, Q: Are We Not Men? A: We Are Devo! (1978), which significantly increased their exposure. After their second album, Duty Now for the Future (1979), was less well received, their third album, Freedom of Choice (1980), produced the surprise hit single "Whip It", which reached No. 14 on the Billboard Hot 100. The album climbed to No. 22 on the Billboard 200, and its follow-up, New Traditionalists (1981), was nearly as successful, peaking at No. 23.

Oh, No! It's Devo (1982) saw the band moving more towards the mainstream and sported an increased use of synthesizers and electronic percussion, but was less well received than its two predecessors. The band's sixth studio album, Shout (1984), continued in this vein and was received poorly, which caused Warner Bros. to buy out the remainder of Devo's contract. Myers left the band soon after.

In 1987, Devo reformed with new drummer David Kendrick, formerly of Sparks, to replace Myers. Their first project was a soundtrack for the horror film Slaughterhouse Rock (1988), starring Toni Basil, after which they released the albums Total Devo (1988) and Smooth Noodle Maps (1990), on Enigma.

In 1990, the members of Devo, bar Bob Mothersbaugh, appeared in the film The Spirit of '76 (1990). Devo later had a falling out and played two shows in 1991 before breaking up. Following the split, Casale began a career as a director of music videos and commercials, working with bands including Rush, Soundgarden, Silverchair and the Foo Fighters.

In 2005, Devo recorded a new version of "Whip It" to be used in Swiffer television commercials, a decision they have said they regretted. During an interview with the Dallas Observer, Casale said, "It's just aesthetically offensive. It's got everything a commercial that turns people off has."

In 2006, Devo worked on a project with Disney known as Devo 2.0. A band of child performers was assembled and re-recorded Devo songs. A quote from the Akron Beacon Journal stated, "Devo recently finished a new project in cahoots with Disney called Devo 2.0, which features the band playing old songs and two new ones with vocals provided by children. Their debut album, a two disc CD/DVD combo entitled DEV2.0, was released on March 14, 2006. The lyrics of some of the songs were changed for family-friendly airplay, which has been claimed by the band to be a play on irony of the messages of their classic hits."

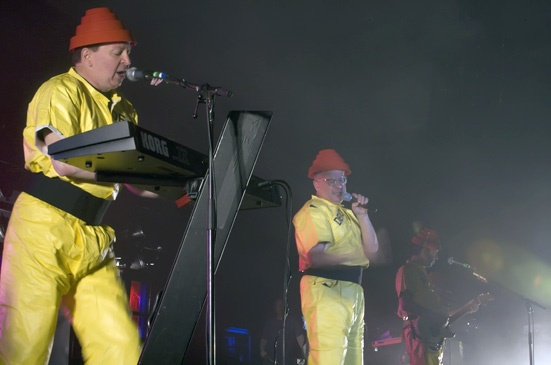
Devo performing live at Festival Hall, in Melbourne, Australia, 2008: Casale and Mark Mothersbaugh

In an April 2007 interview, Gerald Casale mentioned a tentative project for a biographical film about Devo's early days. According to Casale, a script was supposedly in development, called The Beginning Was the End. Casale stated that there might be some new Devo material coming as well, but whether it was related to the release of a film was unclear. Devo played their first European tour since 1990 in the summer of 2007, including a performance at Festival Internacional de Benicàssim.

In December 2007, Devo released their first new single since 1990, "Watch Us Work It", which was featured in a commercial for Dell. The song features a sample drum track from the New Traditionalists song "The Super Thing". The band announced in a July 23, 2007, MySpace bulletin that a full-length music video for the song was forthcoming and the song itself was available on iTunes and eMusic. Casale said that the song was chosen from a batch that the band was working on, and that it was the closest the band had been to a new album.

In a December 5, 2007, article on Mutato Muzika, LA Weekly reported that "After touring sporadically over the past decade but not releasing any new material, Devo are spending December at Mutato trying to create an album's worth of new material and contemplating a method of dispersal in the post-record-company world." In an April 2008 interview, Mothersbaugh revealed a song title from the in-progress album: "Don't Shoot, I'm a Man". In a radio interview on April 17, 2008, Casale stated that Mothersbaugh had "killed the project" and that there would be no new Devo album. Casale, however, later stated that "We're going to finish what we started." The album, Something for Everybody, was eventually released on June 15, 2010, preceded by a 12-inch vinyl single of "Fresh"/"What We Do" on June 10.

Devo was awarded the first Moog Innovator Award on October 29, 2010, during Moogfest 2010 in Asheville, North Carolina. The Moog Innovator Award has been said to celebrate "pioneering artists whose genre-defying work exemplifies the bold, innovative spirit of Bob Moog". Devo was scheduled to perform at Moogfest, but Bob Mothersbaugh severely injured his hand three days prior, and the band was forced to cancel. Mark Mothersbaugh and Gerald Casale collaborated with Austin, Texas, band The Octopus Project to perform "Girl U Want" and "Beautiful World" at the event instead.

In an interview on March 3, 2011, Casale stated that he was "working on a script for a... Devo musical" that would be aimed towards a live Broadway production.

In August 2012, the band released a single called "Don't Roof Rack Me, Bro (Seamus Unleashed)", dedicated to the Republican Party presidential candidate Mitt Romney's former pet dog Seamus. The title relates to the Mitt Romney dog incident, which occurred in 1983 when Romney traveled twelve hours with the dog in a crate on his car's roof rack. Casale also mentioned plans to release a collection of demos from the Something for Everybody sessions, with potential titles being Devo Opens the Vault, Gems from the Devo Dumpster, or Something Else for Everybody. The album was eventually titled Something Else for Everybody and was released on May 20, 2014.

In April 2020, Casale participated in a long-form interview with the Conan Neutron's Protonic Reversal podcast, discussing many subjects related to the band and more. He returned for a follow-up the next month and again two years later.

On July 12, 2024, it was announced that Casale would receive the Dallas VideoFest's Ernie Kovacs Award in September. The organizers stated, "As a primary force behind Devo's creative vision, Jerry Casale is also responsible for designing the band's visually striking concert stage shows and Dadaist costumes, including their signature red 'Energy Dome' hats."

=== Other work ===
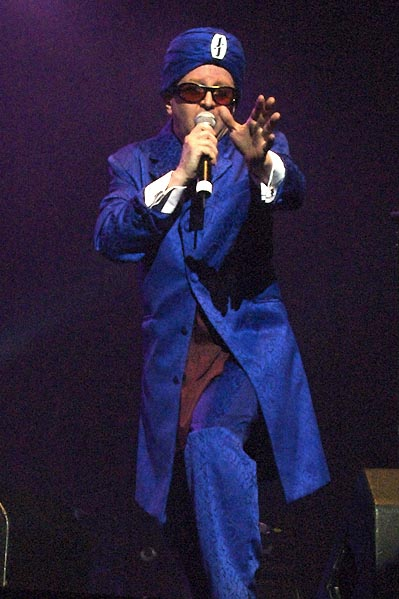
Casale as Jihad Jerry performing live with Devo in San Francisco, California, 2006

In 2005, Casale announced his "solo" project, Jihad Jerry & the Evildoers (the Evildoers themselves including the other members of Devo) and released the first EP, Army Girls Gone Wild in 2006. A full-length album, Mine Is Not a Holy War, was released on September 12, 2006, after a several-month delay. It featured mostly new material, plus re-recordings of four obscure Devo songs: "I Need a Chick" and "I Been Refused" (from Hardcore Devo: Volume Two), "Find Out" (which appeared on the single and EP of "Peek-a-Boo!" in 1982) and "Beehive" (which was recorded by the band in 1974, then apparently abandoned with the exception of one appearance at a special show in 2001).

Casale directed several television commercials, including ads for Diet Coke and Honda Scooters featuring Devo, as well as for Coco's restaurants, and Miller Lite. Distinctive elements of Casale's visual style include Dutch angles, desaturated color, and color washes on images.

While Jihad Jerry never toured, the theatrical character appeared with Devo at several shows in 2006, as well as on the Fox News program Red Eye. Casale abandoned the Jihad Jerry character in 2007; He was quoted as saying "People are kind of freaked out by the Jihad Jerry stuff. I thought they'd all think it was really funny and get off on it but people are really offended and scared... I think that's it. I don’t want them to have Jihad Jerry to kick around anymore!". Later Casale donned the Jihad Jerry turban for a performance with UK-based DJ and producer Adam Freeland at the South by Southwest music festival in 2009.

Casale and Mothersbaugh have also produced music for other artists including Toni Basil.

In 2014, Casale made a cameo appearance in a 1980s themed Delta Air Lines in-flight safety video, portraying a passenger who puts his "carry on" item (a Devo energy dome) under the seat in front of him in order to prepare for takeoff.

Casale collaborated with Italian electronic artist Phunk Investigation on the song "It's All Devo!", released as an EP under his real name for Record Store Day 2016.

== Personal life ==
In 1970, he was a student at Kent State University in Kent, Ohio, and witnessed the 1970 Kent State shootings. Two people killed at the shootings, Jeffrey Miller and Allison Krause, were friends of Casale. In a 2020 interview, he stated, "I went through some traumatic change. It was just a fork in the road where you realize everything you've been told is a lie. [...] We didn't see progress. We saw it going backwards, we start getting more tribal and more demonically mean and more chaotic."

Casale took an interest in wine after moving to California in 1978. In the 1990s he taught classes in wine tasting for three years during Devo's hiatus. In 2014, he announced that he would be opening a new wine company, the 50 by 50, selling Pinot noirs.

Casale bought the historic Josef Kun House in 2007 and spent seven years in meticulous restoration with the help of preservationist James Rega. The house was designed by Richard Neutra in the early 1930s. Casale placed the house on the market in 2015.

On February 17, 2014, Casale's younger brother and fellow Devo bandmate Bob Casale died at age 61. According to Gerald, it was a "sudden death from conditions that led to heart failure."

On September 11, 2015, Casale married Krista Napp in Santa Monica, California. Prior to the wedding, the couple had reportedly been questioned by friends about the date coinciding with the 14th anniversary of the September 11th attacks. After joking that he and Napp were "the Twin Towers of love", a friend who was in charge of the cake fashioned a 9/11-themed reception without their knowledge, featuring a cake baked in the shape of the Twin Towers, box cutters as party favors and table place setting cards featuring images of box cutters with "Gerald & Krista" engraved on them. After TMZ ran a story about the event on September 14 and published photos, Casale received significant backlash from the media and online. Apologizing to anyone who was offended, Casale called the reception a "surprise" and a "set-up", explaining that his friend "thought it was some sort of transgressive sick humor and the problem is, it's not funny."

As of 2021, Casale lives on a ranch in Napa, California. On November 17, 2022, Casale's wife gave birth to their first child, Inara.

In a 2022 interview with Spin, Casale stated that his five favorite albums were Bob Dylan's Greatest Hits (1967), The Velvet Underground & Nico (1967), the Jimi Hendrix Experience's Electric Ladyland (1968), David Bowie's Diamond Dogs (1974) and the Chemical Brothers' Dig Your Own Hole (1997).

Casale and the other Devo members used to be part of the Church of the SubGenius.

== Soundtracks ==
Year	Title	Director(s)	Studio(s)	Notes
1987	Revenge of the Nerds II: Nerds in Paradise	Joe Roth	20th Century Fox	with Mark Mothersbaugh
1988	Slaughterhouse Rock	Dimitri Logothetis	Arista Films	with Mark Mothersbaugh

== Filmography ==
=== Music videos ===
Year	Song	Artist	Notes
1978	"(I Can't Get No) Satisfaction"	Devo	Co-directed by Chuck Statler
1978	"Come Back Jonee"	Devo	Co-directed by Chuck Statler
1979	"The Day My Baby Gave Me a Surprise"	Devo	
1979	"Worried Man"	Devo	Segment in the film Human Highway
1980	"Panorama"	The Cars	Co-directed by Chuck Statler
1980	"Touch and Go"	The Cars	Co-directed by Chuck Statler
1980	"Girl U Want"	Devo	Co-directed by Chuck Statler
1980	"Freedom of Choice"	Devo	Co-directed by Chuck Statler
1980	"Whip It"	Devo	
1981	"Love Without Anger"	Devo	Co-directed by Chuck Statler
1981	"Through Being Cool"	Devo	
1981	"Beautiful World"	Devo	
1982	"Time Out for Fun"	Devo	Co-directed by Chuck Statler
1982	"Peek-a-Boo!"	Devo	Co-directed by Chuck Statler
1982	"That's Good"	Devo	Co-directed by Chuck Statler
1983	"Theme from Doctor Detroit"	Devo	Co-directed by Chuck Statler
1984	"Are You Experienced?"	Devo	Co-directed by Chuck Statler
1985	"Meeting in the Ladies Room"	Klymaxx	
1985	"Mystic Rhythms"	Rush	
1985	"One More Colour"	Jane Siberry	
1986	"I Can See It"	Blancmange	
1988	"Disco Dancer"	Devo	
1989	"Superconductor"	Rush	
1989	"There Must Be Love"	Akiko Yano	Promotional film - part one of three
1989	"How To Catch A Cold"	Akiko Yano	Promotional film - part two of three
1989	"Watching You"	Akiko Yano	Promotional film - part three of three
1990	"Post Post-Modern Man"	Devo	
1995	"I'll Stick Around"	Foo Fighters	
1996	"Blow Up the Outside World"	Soundgarden	
1997	"You Don't Have to Hurt No More"	Mint Condition	
1997	"Freak"	Silverchair	
1997	"Cemetery"	Silverchair	
1997	"Bikeracks"	Cola	
1997	"Green to Me"	Hum	
1997	"Downtime"	Fat	
1997	"Good Year"	The Refreshments	
1998	"Self Destructive"	Ridel High	
2004	"Imagine"	A Perfect Circle	
2006	"Army Girls Gone Wild"	Jihad Jerry & the Evildoers	Co-directed by Grady Sain
2009	"Don't Shoot (I'm a Man)"	Devo	Co-directed by Davy Force
2010	"Fresh"	Devo	Co-directed by Davy Force
2011	"What We Do"	Devo	Co-directed by Kii Arens and Jason Trucco
2011	"California"	Datarock	
2016	"It's All Devo!"	Devo's Gerald Casale with Phunk Investigation	Co-directed with Maurizio Temporin
2021	"I'm Gonna Pay U Back"	Devo's Gerald V. Casale	Co-directed by Davy Force
2022	"The Invisible Man (Remix)"	Devo's Gerald V. Casale with Martyn Ware	Co-directed by Davy Force

== Discography ==
=== Solo ===
Year	Title	Label	Notes
2005	Army Girls Gone Wild EP	Cordless Recordings	as Jihad Jerry & the Evildoers
2006	Mine Is Not a Holy War	Cordless Recordings	as Jihad Jerry & the Evildoers
2008	"To Be or Not"	X Production	as Devo's Gerald Casale with Die Alten Maschinen
2016	"It's All Devo!"	MVD	as Devo's Gerald Casale with Phunk Investigation
2021	AKA Jihad Jerry & The Evildoers	Real Gone Music	as DEVO's Gerald V. Casale Remastered and expanded version of Mine Is Not a Holy War
2022	The Invisible Man EP	MVD	as DEVO's Gerald V. Casale

== See also ==
- List of celebrities who own wineries and vineyards
