= Whip It (Devo song) =

1980 single by Devo

Single by Devo

from the album Freedom of Choice
- B-side: "Turn Around"
- Released: August 13, 1980
- Studio: Record Plant (Hollywood)
- Genre: New wave; synth-pop
- Length: 2:37
- Label: Warner Bros.
- Songwriters: Mark Mothersbaugh; Gerald Casale
- Producers: Devo; Robert Margouleff

Devo singles chronology
"Girl U Want" (1980)	"Whip It" (1980)	"Gates of Steel" (1980)

Music video
- "Whip It" on YouTube

"Whip It" is a song by American new wave band Devo from their third studio album Freedom of Choice (1980). It is a new wave and synth-pop song that features a synthesizer, electric guitar, bass guitar, and drums in its instrumentation. The apparently nonsensical lyrics have a common theme revolving around the ability to deal with one's problems by "whipping it". Co-written by bassist Gerald Casale and lead vocalist Mark Mothersbaugh, Mothersbaugh later claimed the lyrics were a tongue-in-cheek pep talk for incumbent president Jimmy Carter ahead of the 1980 United States presidential election. Devo recorded "Whip It" with producer Robert Margouleff at the Record Plant in Los Angeles.

Although "Whip It" was released as the second single from Freedom of Choice, Warner Bros. Records did not expect it to be a hit, due to its nonstandard tempo and strange lyrics. The disc jockey (DJ) Kal Rudman took an interest in the song and it was soon being played on several radio stations in the Southeastern United States. Peaking at number 14 on the Billboard Hot 100, "Whip It" became a hit single and found chart success in several countries. Mothersbaugh believes the song sold well because some people assumed the lyrics were about masturbation or sadomasochism.

An accompanying music video depicts these sexual themes; it features Mothersbaugh whipping clothing from a woman on a dude ranch. Despite some claims of misogynistic undertones, the video became popular on the fledgling television channel MTV.

== Background and recording ==
Devo's previous studio album Duty Now for the Future (1979) was considered a disappointment by critics and band members; critics regarded it as a formulaic repeat of the band's 1978 debut Q: Are We Not Men? A: We Are Devo! and the band members primarily blamed the formulaic sound on the album's producer Ken Scott. Warner Bros. Records was also unhappy with Duty Now for the Future and issued an ultimatum to Devo that they needed to produce a successful follow-up album, or they would be dropped from the label. The band members believed a hit single would bolster the next album's popularity and finally give them radio exposure. In late 1979, audio engineer Robert Margouleff was brought on to produce "Whip It", along with its parent album Freedom of Choice.

"Whip It" was written between August and October 1979 by bassist Jerry Casale and lead vocalist and keyboardist Mark Mothersbaugh. Howard Siegal engineered the song while Margouleff served as the producer. It was recorded at the Record Plant in Los Angeles and mastered by Ken Perry at Capitol Studios. The song was recorded using API mixing consoles, 3M tape machines, and Minimoog and Prophet-5 synthesizers. Throughout the song, there are whipcracking noises that were recorded using an Electrocomp 500 synthesizer and Neumann KM 84 and U 87 microphones.

The music for "Whip It" was crafted by taking elements from four different demo tapes that Casale had collected. Mothersbaugh composed what became the song's break in his bedroom; the break was originally much slower and had a classical sound. On another tape, Mothersbaugh played what became the main riff with a drum machine. One of Captain Beefheart's drummers created a beat that Mothersbaugh recorded; the last demo was a live recording between Casale and Mothersbaugh. Casale took the four demos and layered them to create a smooth, consistent time signature. Mothersbaugh created the main riff in "Whip It" by taking the riff used in Roy Orbison's song "Oh, Pretty Woman" and changing the ending slightly.

== Composition ==
=== Music and vocals ===
"Whip It"
A sixteen second audio sample of "Whip It", featuring vocals by Casale and Mothersbaugh. The song is defined by its motorik beat and seemingly nonsensical lyrics about "whipping it".

"Whip It" is a new wave and synth-pop song, that is built around a consistent 4/4 beat known as a motorik beat. It is constructed in verse–chorus form. With a chord progression of D-A-E7sus4 in the verses and C-G-D in the choruses, the song is written in the key of E major. "Whip It"'s main riff alternates between a five-note ascension and a three-note descension, and is played with a synthesizer, electric guitar, and bass guitar. The chorus features two synthesizer notes that are a half step apart, which creates what AllMusic's Steve Huey describes as "a disorienting aural effect".

As the song progresses, a guitar lick in the main riff becomes more prominent. During the instrumental break, the riff temporarily reconfigures to a nonstandard 6/4 beat before returning to the original 4/4 beat. Casale and Mothersbaugh sing the vocals of "Whip It" with a vocal range of A4-F#5. The singers take alternate turns on vocals; Mothersbaugh uses a nasal drawl while Casale sings in a more powerful "cartoonish" voice. The use of two vocalists is a call and response that Casale said is "kind of like white boys rapping".

=== Lyrics ===
The lyrics of "Whip It" are disjointed and nonsensical. For example, its central theme revolves around the ability to solve one's problems by "whipping it"; other lines include motivational statements like "go forward, move ahead" and "it's not too late". Casale wrote the lyrics, which were intended to satirize American optimism. He took inspiration from communist propaganda posters and Gravity's Rainbow by Thomas Pynchon, a 1973 novel that contains satirical limericks about capitalist can-do clichés. Casale incorporated lyrics that would sound like motivational clichés if taken out of context. Ultimate Classic Rock critic Dave Swanson interpreted the lyrics as being "an observation...on the struggles of the common man, woman and mutant."

Mothersbaugh offered a different interpretation of the lyrics, saying they were written in the form of a subtle pep talk for United States President Jimmy Carter during the 1980 presidential election. The members of Devo supported Carter and feared the Republican candidate Ronald Reagan would win the election. Mothersbaugh jokingly once said in an interview: "Come on Jimmy, get your shit together". Huey notes that despite the song's novelty, there are violent undertones in the lyrics. He describes the process of whipping it to solve one's problems as "a sardonic portrait of a general, problematic aspect of the American psyche: the predilection for using force and violence to solve problems, vent frustration, and prove oneself to others".

== Release and reception ==
"Whip It" is one of four songs from Freedom of Choice to be released as a single. Warner Bros. heavily favored the commercial viability of the first single "Girl U Want" because its music and lyrics were more radio-friendly and akin to "My Sharona" by the Knack. "Girl U Want" did not chart and was considered a failure. Despite this disappointment, Devo decided to tour in support of the album without a hit single. Shortly into the tour, disc jockey (DJ) Kal Rudman programmed "Whip It" to be played on several radio stations in the Southeastern U.S., which led urban music programmer Frankie Crocker to push the song at powerhouse WBLS in New York City. Within a week, "Whip It" had become so popular that Devo was forced to temporarily stop its tour to book larger venues because the concerts were selling out too quickly. When Devo returned home, they played a series of large concerts at the Santa Monica Civic Auditorium in late August 1980, attended by Hollywood celebrities and other L.A. musicians. Casale later said that the rising popularity of "Whip It" helped to fill such large venues, along with the continued "big booster" promotion of Devo by KROQ radio in Southern California. KROQ's listeners chose "Whip It" as their number 1 favorite song in the year-end list KROQ Top 106.7 of 1980.

"Whip It" debuted at number eighty-five on the U.S. Billboard Hot 100 on August 30, 1980. It spent twenty-five weeks on the chart, peaked at number fourteen on November 15, 1980, and finished the year at number ninety-four on the Billboard Year-End singles chart for 1981. In the U.S., the song also reached number thirteen on the Cash Box Top 100, number eight on the Hot Dance Club Play chart, (Note: With "Gates of Steel" and "Freedom of Choice".) and number seventeen on the Record World Singles chart. "Whip It" found international success, peaking at number seventy-seven on the Australian Kent Music Report, number eleven on the Canadian RPM Top Singles chart, number eleven on the Official New Zealand Music Chart, and number fifty-one on the UK Singles Chart. The song was certified Gold in the U.S. and Canada, denoting shipments of 1,000,000 and 75,000 copies respectively.

In a contemporary review, Record World called it "Devo's strongest pop outing to date." In a retrospective review, Huey said the song has "an irresistibly odd novelty appeal" and that it was "one of the best arguments that punk ideology didn't necessarily lose its bite when placed in the more pop-oriented musical context of new wave". PopMatters' Chris Gerard noted the song's originality and described it as "a bold and provocative recording that still sounds fantastic blasted out of a good set of speakers". The website subsequently ranked "Whip It" as the fifty-first best alternative song of the 1980s.

When "Whip It" was released, some listeners assumed the lyrics were double entendres for masturbation or sadomasochism. Devo's previous material often included sexual innuendos or blatant references to sex in the lyrics, which made "Whip It" appear consistent with this style of songwriting. Mothersbaugh said many disc jockeys would make masturbation jokes to him before interviews. At first, the band members attempted to dissuade them of this assumption but they eventually gave in and helped reinforce these misinterpretations. Mothersbaugh believed a song about taboo subjects would receive more radio airplay and sell more copies.

== Music video ==
A screenshot from the "Whip It" music video in which Mothersbaugh uses a whip to remove a woman's clothing while the other band members play in a cattle-pen.

Although "Whip It" was not about masturbation or sadomasochism as some listeners believed, Devo used these sexual themes for an accompanying music video. The video is set on a dude ranch where cowboys and cowgirls are watching Mothersbaugh whip the clothing from a cigarette-smoking woman. A cross-eyed woman and a middle-aged woman making whipped cream watch from a ranch house while the other members of Devo perform the song in a cattle pen. The band members are wearing sleeveless black turtlenecks and red flowerpot-shaped hats called energy domes.

Devo was heavily committed to adding film aspects to its act; the band asked Warner Bros. to provide non-recoupable promotional money to make videos for "Girl U Want" and "Freedom of Choice". This was before the making of music videos had become standard industry practice, which confused label executives. When "Whip It" started to receive radio airplay, the record company embraced the concept and asked the band to produce a video for "Whip It" with a $15,000 budget. The idea for the video came from an article in a 1962 issue of The Dude magazine, which revolved around a former stuntman who marries a stripper and moves to a dude ranch in Arizona. For entertainment, the man would use a whip to remove the clothes from his wife, who would remain unhurt. Mothersbaugh stated; "That's the kind of stuff that fed us creatively. It was just so stupid and so low, and yet so great."

The video was partially a reaction to President Ronald Reagan's previous career as a Hollywood actor; Devo wanted to make a video that satirized both the cowboy mythos and "right-wing racist values". In the video, the whip does not strike the woman's clothes; they were tied to a fishing line and pulled away after each whip crack. The whip did, however, strike the cigarette holder to knock it out of her mouth. For the first few months after its release, the video was seen by a limited audience, primarily on late-night talk shows. The American television channel MTV, which was launched in 1981, gave the video so much exposure that it temporarily revived the song's popularity, shortly before the release of Devo's next studio album New Traditionalists (1981).

The video attracted some controversy, particularly for its perceived misogynistic undertones. Casale said the band members intended the video to appear tasteless and demeaning but also funny. The claims of misogyny increased when Devo was cut from a live performance on an episode of The Midnight Special hosted by Lily Tomlin. After watching the video, Tomlin refused to host the show unless Devo was cut. There were also claims that MTV banned the video but these claims were ultimately proven false.

== Legacy ==
If there was a Hall of Fame for early '80s New Wave music, Devo's 'Whip It' would be a shoo-in for induction. Undoubtedly the band's most recognizable song, 'Whip It' elevated Devo from an underground art-rock outfit to a (briefly) mainstream pop act, albeit one that still retained its pointed and satirical view of society. And, of course, who can forget the song's surrealist and now-iconic video that was a staple of MTV during the then-fledgling channel's early years? The fact that The Simpsons even paid homage to both the song and the video in an episode demonstrates how much 'Whip It' has transcended pop culture.

— David Chiu of PopMatters, discussing the song's legacy.

Several journalists view "Whip It" as a cornerstone of the development of new wave music in the early 1980s. In his book Pop Goes the Decade: The Eighties, Thomas Harrison wrote that the song introduced heavily synthesized music to a mainstream audience while music critic Evie Nagy called it a "defining anthem of new wave's rise". The majority of new wave music in the early 1980s was produced by British bands. Following the success of "Whip It", Devo joined the B-52's as the face of the emergent American new wave music movement.

The song's popularity can be largely attributed to its distinct originality. Gerard noted that "there's been nothing quite like 'Whip It' in the top 40, before or since". Nagy said the song's drum beat, guitar chords, and keyboard lines are distinct and easily recognizable, even when isolated from the song. In his book 99 Red Balloons: And 100 All-time One-hit Wonders, Brent Mann wrote; "It's hard to find anyone between the ages of 30 and 50 who does not have a vivid recollection of 'Whip It' ... the kind of unusual track that made listeners want to bop their heads and break into a herky-jerky dance."

The accompanying music video is also remembered for its bizarre and controversial content. According to Huey, "the song has remained in the public consciousness thanks in part to MTV's extensive airplay for the video". With the popularity of the video, MTV began pursuing Devo and promised them a new platform to showcase their visual works. Devo, however, eventually developed a troubled relationship with the channel. Most of the band's subsequent videos were censored for controversial content or were rejected because the song was not a hit single. According to Casale; "As soon as MTV went national, they came up with this new Taliban set of rules ... we were stunned and felt jilted."

In the band's forty-year history, "Whip It" remains their only song to chart within the top forty on the Billboard Hot 100, and one of two to reach the top 20 in Canada. As a result, some journalists have labeled Devo as a one-hit wonder. Mann noted that the band's strange philosophy on devolution offset its accessibility, and wrote; "Devo's songs were, quite simply, too far out and counter-culture for mainstream radio". Devo's members have never tried to distance themselves from "Whip It" and as of 2018 still play it live. Casale said; "I'm glad it was 'Whip It', because it was certainly twisted and original ... it came from a pure, creative, open collaboration, and that's to me when all the best stuff comes."

== Covers and media use ==
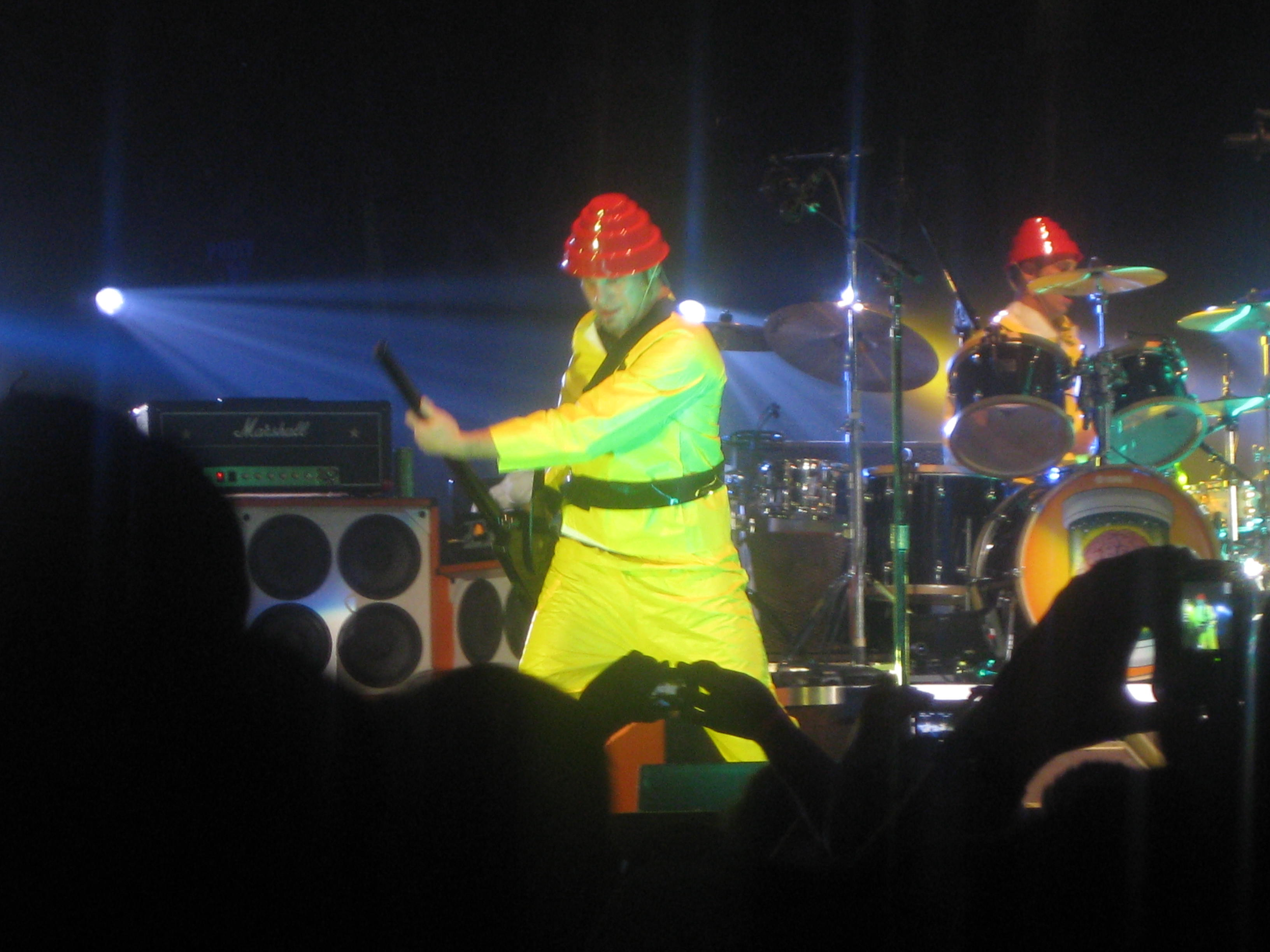
Jeff Ament and Matt Cameron of the band Pearl Jam perform a cover of "Whip It" in 2009. Both musicians are wearing Devo's signature yellow janitorial suits and energy domes.

Since 1980, "Whip It" has been covered by several bands, including Pearl Jam, Love and Death, and Does It Offend You, Yeah?. Chilean rock band Los Prisioneros released a Spanish-language cover titled "Azota" on their 2004 album Manzana. One of the most unusual covers was recorded by the American teen pop band Devo 2.0 and featured on its album DEV2.0 (2006). Devo 2.0, which was created by Walt Disney Records in an attempt to emulate the popularity of the Swedish pop group the A-Teens, covered Devo songs for a teenage audience. Label executives asked Casale to serve as the band's manager; he agreed, reasoning that Devo 2.0 furthered Devo's belief that everything humanity creates— including Devo's own songs—will devolve Casale had to rewrite several lyrics to remove sexual innuendos and references to drugs and suicide, although "Whip It" was not subject to revisions.

It has also been featured in a notable television advertisement for the Swiffer brand, in which Devo performed. They agreed to perform the song for the commercial because they found it to be absurd. Mothersbaugh stated that performing in the commercial "is coming full circle, to be commenting on a conspicuous, consumptive culture ... and to be fed into the hopper and spit back out the other side".

== Personnel ==
Credits adapted from Pioneers Who Got Scalped: The Anthology CD liner notes, except where noted.

Devo

- Mark Mothersbaugh – vocals, keyboards, guitar
- Gerald Casale – vocals, bass guitar, keyboards
- Bob Mothersbaugh – lead guitar, vocals
- Bob Casale – rhythm guitar, keyboards, vocals
- Alan Myers – drums

Technical

- Written by Mark Mothersbaugh and Gerald Casale
- Produced by Devo in association with Robert Margouleff
- Engineered by Robert Margouleff & Howard Siegal
- Assistant engineer: Karat Faye
- Recorded and mixed at Record Plant, Los Angeles
- Mastered by Ken Perry, Capitol Studios, Los Angeles

== Charts ==
=== Weekly charts ===
Weekly chart performance
Chart (1980–1981)	Peak position
Australia (Kent Music Report)	77
Canada Top Singles (RPM)	11
New Zealand (Recorded Music NZ)	11
UK Singles (OCC)	51
US Billboard Hot 100	14
US Billboard Hot Dance Club Play	8
US Cash Box	13
US Record World	17

=== Year-end charts ===
Year-end chart performance
Chart (1981)	Position
US Billboard Hot 100	94

== Certifications ==
Certifications and sales
Region	Certification	Certified units/sales
Canada (Music Canada)	Gold	75,000^{^}
New Zealand (RMNZ)	Platinum	30,000^{‡}
United States (RIAA)	Platinum	1,000,000^{‡}
^{^} Shipments figures based on certification alone.^{‡} Sales+streaming figures based on certification alone.
