= Greatest Hits (Devo album) =

Greatest hits album by Devo
- Released: December 11, 1990
- Recorded: October 1977–February 1984
- Genre: New wave; punk rock; synth-pop
- Length: 57:20
- Label: Warner Bros.
- Producer: Devo

Devo chronology
Smooth Noodle Maps (1990)	Greatest Hits (1990)	Greatest Misses (1990)

Professional ratings
Review scores
Source	Rating
AllMusic	4/5 stars
Robert Christgau	A−

Greatest Hits is a collection of songs by American new wave band Devo, released in 1990. The album includes several photos from previous albums, and the first half of an article on the band by Howie Klein. The second half of this article appears in the accompanying material for Greatest Misses.

== Track listing ==
All tracks are written by Mark Mothersbaugh and Gerald Casale, except where otherwise indicated.

No.	Title	Writer(s)	Original release	Length
1.	"Here to Go (Go Mix Version)" (Remixed by Ivan Ivan)		12-inch single A-side; original version from the album Shout (1984)	5:33
2.	"Through Being Cool"	M. Mothersbaugh, G. Casale, Bob Mothersbaugh	New Traditionalists (1981)	3:12
3.	"Big Mess"		Oh, No! It's Devo (1982)	2:46
4.	"That's Good"		Oh, No! It's Devo	3:25
5.	"Jerkin' Back 'n' Forth"		New Traditionalists	3:05
6.	"Peek-a-Boo!"		Oh, No! It's Devo	3:03
7.	"Beautiful World"		New Traditionalists	3:33
8.	"(I Can't Get No) Satisfaction"	Mick Jagger, Keith Richards	Q: Are We Not Men? A: We Are Devo! (1978)	2:40
9.	"Whip It"		Freedom of Choice (1980)	2:39
10.	"Girl U Want"		Freedom of Choice	2:57
11.	"Freedom of Choice"		Freedom of Choice	3:28
12.	"Smart Patrol/Mr. DNA"		Duty Now for the Future (1979)	6:06
13.	"Gut Feeling"	M. Mothersbaugh, B. Mothersbaugh	Q: Are We Not Men? A: We Are Devo!	4:59
14.	"Gates of Steel"	G. Casale, M. Mothersbaugh, Sue Schmidt, Debbie Smith	Freedom of Choice	3:28
15.	"Working in the Coal Mine"	Allen Toussaint	Heavy Metal Soundtrack, 7-inch single included with New Traditionalists	2:49
16.	"Jocko Homo"	M. Mothersbaugh	Q: Are We Not Men? A: We Are Devo!	3:37

== Personnel ==
Devo

- Bob Casale – rhythm guitar, keyboards, vocals
- Gerald Casale – vocals, bass guitar, keyboards
- Bob Mothersbaugh – lead guitar, vocals
- Mark Mothersbaugh – vocals, keyboards, guitar
- Alan Myers – drums

Technical

- Devo – producer (1, 2, 5, 7, 15), co-producer (9–11, 14)
- Ivan Ivan – remixing (1)
- Roy Thomas Baker – producer (3, 4, 6)
- Brian Eno – producer (8, 13, 16)
- Robert Margouleff – co-producer (9–11, 14)
- Ken Scott – producer, engineer (12)
- Kathe Duba-Noland – album compilation
- Gerald Casale – album compilation, art devotion
- Mark Mothersbaugh – album compilation
- Tim Stedman – art devotion
- Alex Remlyn – devography
- General Boy – liner notes
- Howie Klein – liner notes
- Janet Perr – photography
- Karen Filter – photography
- Effective Graphics – computer graphics
