= Greatest Misses (Devo album) =

Compilation album by Devo
- Released: December 11, 1990
- Recorded: 1976–September 1982
- Genre: New wave; punk rock; synth-pop
- Length: 46:37
- Label: Warner Bro.
- Producer: Devo

Devo chronology
Greatest Hits (1990)	Greatest Misses (1990)	Hardcore Devo: Volume One (1990)

Professional ratings
Review scores
Source	Rating
AllMusic	3/5 stars
Robert Christgau	(2-star Honorable Mention)

Greatest Misses is a compilation album of songs by American new wave band Devo, released on December 11, 1990 by Warner Bros. Records. Greatest Misses contains lesser-known tracks and alternate versions of tracks from other albums. It has a Parental Advisory label because of the song "Penetration in the Centrefold".

The album's booklet includes several photos from previous albums, and the second half of an article on the band by Howie Klein for BAM magazine. The first half of this article appears in the booklet for Greatest Hits.

== Track listing ==
All tracks are written by Mark Mothersbaugh, except where otherwise indicated.

No.	Title	Writer(s)	Original release	Length
1.	"Devo Corporate Anthem"		Duty Now for the Future (1979)	1:16
2.	"Clockout"	Gerald Casale	Duty Now for the Future	2:48
3.	"The Day My Baby Gave Me a Surprize"		Duty Now for the Future	2:42
4.	"Shrivel Up"	M. Mothersbaugh; G. Casale; Bob Mothersbaugh	Q: Are We Not Men? A: We Are Devo! (1978)	3:05
5.	"Blockhead"	M. Mothersbaugh; B. Mothersbaugh	Duty Now for the Future	3:01
6.	"Pink Pussycat"	M. Mothersbaugh; B. Mothersbaugh	Duty Now for the Future	3:11
7.	"Mongoloid"	G. Casale	Q: Are We Not Men? A: We Are Devo!	3:45
8.	"Be Stiff (Booji Boy Version)"	G. Casale; Bob Lewis	Single A-side (1978)	2:35
9.	"(I Can't Get No) Satisfaction (Booji Boy Version)"	Mick Jagger; Keith Richards	Hardcore Devo: Volume One (1990)	3:00
10.	"Penetration in the Centrefold"	M. Mothersbaugh; G. Casale	B-side of "The Day My Baby Gave Me a Surprize" (1979)	2:28
11.	"Too Much Paranoias"		Q: Are We Not Men? A: We Are Devo!	1:58
12.	"S.I.B. (Swelling Itching Brain)"		Duty Now for the Future	4:29
13.	"Mechanical Man (Booji Boy Version)"		Mechanical Man EP (1978)	3:20
14.	"Speed Racer"		Oh, No! It's Devo (1982)	2:40
15.	"Timing X/Space Junk"	M. Mothersbaugh; G. Casale; B. Mothersbaugh	Duty Now for the Future/Q: Are We Not Men? A: We Are Devo!	3:27
16.	"Jocko Homo (Booji Boy Version)"		The Truth About De-Evolution (1976)	2:53
Total length:				46:37

- "Jocko Homo" is the original demo version featured in the short film The Truth About De-Evolution (1976), later reissued on Hardcore Devo: Volume One (1990).

== Personnel ==
Devo

- Bob Casale – rhythm guitar, keyboards, vocals
- Gerald Casale – vocals, bass guitar, keyboards
- Bob Mothersbaugh – lead guitar, vocals
- Mark Mothersbaugh – vocals, keyboards, guitar
- Alan Myers – drums

Technical

- Brian Eno – producer (4, 7–11, 15b)
- Devo – producer (13, 16)
- Roy Thomas Baker – producer (14)
- Ken Scott – producer, engineer (1–3, 5, 6, 12, 15a)
- Kathe Duba-Noland – album compilation
- Gerald Casale – album compilation, art devotion
- Mark Mothersbaugh – album compilation
- Tim Stedman – art devotion
- Alex Remlyn – devography
- Howie Klein – liner notes
- Erik Arnesen – photography
- Bobbi Watson – photography
- Moshe Brakha – photography
