= New Traditionalists =

Studio album by Devo
- Released: September 16, 1981
- Recorded: December 1980 – April 1981
- Studios: Power Station, New York City; Record Plant, Los Angeles
- Genres: New wave; synth-pop; post-punk
- Length: 33:28
- Label: Warner Bros.
- Producer: Devo

Devo chronology
Freedom of Choice (1980)	New Traditionalists (1981)	Oh, No! It's Devo (1982)

Alternative cover
- International cover

Singles from New Traditionalists
- 1. "Love Without Anger" Released: August 26, 1981; 2. "Through Being Cool" Released: September 18, 1981; 3. "Beautiful World" Released: October 14, 1981

New Traditionalists is the fourth studio album by American new wave band Devo, released on September 16, 1981, by Warner Bros. Records. The album was recorded over a period of four months between December 1980 and April 1981 at the Power Station in Manhattan, New York City. It features the minor hits "Through Being Cool" and "Beautiful World".

== Background ==
Following the band's success with "Whip It" and its parent album, Freedom of Choice (1980), the band's label, Warner Bros., began exerting pressure on the band to "write another 'Whip It'." As the single's success carried on into early 1981, Warner Bros. opted not to issue a follow-up single from the album and instead have Devo focus on completing their next studio album to capitalize on the momentum. However, with New Traditionalists, Devo would opt to craft a darker and less accessible album that explored their concept of "de-evolution" even further. Band member Gerald Casale later stated, "We wouldn't keep painting the same painting over and over. It wasn't in our nature."

== Composition ==
New Traditionalists contains songs in a minimalist synth-pop style, with an emphasis on synthesizer riffs and dance rhythms, as well as an increased focus on electronic percussion. Lyrically, the album contains more straightforward sentiments than the band's previous albums, often eschewing sarcasm and irony for overt anger. Rolling Stone Australia notes that the song "Beautiful World" "waits a while to reveal its hidden darkness and cynicism", echoed in its music video, which starts out "happy" and "optimistic". In "Enough Said", Devo make one of their first overtly political statements, advocating throwing leaders into a ring and letting them "fight like hell to see who's king". The lyrics were written by Mark and Bob's father Robert Mothersbaugh Sr., who also played their character General Boy.

According to music historian Andy Zax, New Traditionalists found Devo "more than slightly ambivalent about their newfound popularity", exemplified in opening track "Through Being Cool", with its criticism of trendy "ninnies" and "twits". Zax also observed that songs such as "Jerkin' Back 'n' Forth" and "Love Without Anger" "dissect dysfunctional relationships from the inside, rather than from afar".

== Production ==
New Traditionalists was the band's first fully self-produced album. Unlike the band's previous records, the album features a greater emphasis on synthesizers than guitars, and several tracks incorporate a drum machine. Equipment used during the recording of the album includes several pieces from Roland, notably sequencers, the SH-101 synthesizer and the CR-78 drum machine. In a 2020 interview, Gerald Casale stated that he felt New Traditionalists "was the last [Devo] record where there was some semblance of balance between primal energy and just electronics for their own sake."

The album was recorded on a then-new brand of 2-inch tape from 3M. However, when Devo began recording the vocals for the album, the edges of the tape had begun to disintegrate. After asking Warner Bros. if they could start over and re-record the album from scratch and being denied, Devo transferred all the work they had done to digital reel-to-reel tape and finished the album via digital recording at the Record Plant in Los Angeles, California. DJ Pangburn of Reverb.com later opined that "the sound quality isn't a major problem. The deterioration of the master magnetic tape gives [the album] a darker hue—one that matches the album's even more dystopian concept and songs."

"The Super Thing" was later sampled in Devo's 2007 single "Watch Us Work It", which was remixed by Teddybears.

== Title and artwork ==
Devo devised the album's title while touring their Freedom of Choice album in Japan. The group had met two businessmen in a sushi bar who were wearing pins that read "New Traditionalists". Band member Mark Mothersbaugh recalled that the band were inspired by the phrase, as they wanted to create new traditions themselves.

The phrase belonged to a right-wing political group in Japan, who were using it as their name, and Devo found the pins in stores and purchased them as a joke. When the album was being written, the group recalled the name and decided that it would work for their songs. In the words of Gerald Casale, "We became the New Traditionalists but turned it on its ear. We appropriated the idea of that, meaning we were going to provide you with new traditions to forget about the old ones".

The front and back cover were photographed by Moshe Brakha and feature artwork by Richard Seireeni, based on a concept by the band. The band's clothing, also worn during live performances, was influenced by Japanese fashion, while the rubber pompadours, created by Brent Scrivner, were based on the hairstyle of John F. Kennedy but were frequently mistaken for that of Ronald Reagan. Casale's longheld interest in the space program led to the band using a cartoon image of an astronaut's head from a paper Halloween mask in the artwork, which was later reused for the limited edition "Beautiful World" picture disc.

The band wore blue V-neck T-shirts with the New Traditionalists astronaut on the black sleeves. This shirt can be seen on the US, Australian and New Zealand versions of the album cover. On the European cover, Devo is seen wearing "Sleeveless Maxi-Turtleneck Sweaters". The T-shirts, turtlenecks and plastic versions of the pompadours were all available through Devo's fan club catalog.

The first pressings of the LP included a 33 inch by 22 inch poster, designed by the Church of the SubGenius.

== Promotion ==
=== Music videos ===
Devo made three music videos for the album. "Through Being Cool" had Devo taking a limited role, focusing on a team of kids clad in Devo "Action Vests" attacking arrogant and ignorant people with "spudguns".

In "Love Without Anger", Devo acts as a Greek chorus to a bizarre love story between two humanoid chickens. It also features a stop motion video by Rev. Ivan Stang (Church of the SubGenius) of Barbie and Ken fighting each other and removing each other's body parts. A portrait of J. R. "Bob" Dobbs is on the wall above the couch.

The music video for the song "Beautiful World" features the character Booji Boy prominently, as he initially watches scenes of beautiful women, futuristic cars and other happy elements, which by the end of the song have been replaced by images of race riots, the Ku Klux Klan, World War I, famine in Africa, car crashes and nuclear explosions, which puts a much darker slant on the song's lyrics. The video was slightly censored for broadcasts on the ABC-TV music show Countdown. A small segment of archive footage depicting a woman on fire was considered unsuitable for the show's early evening time slot—despite the fact that the flames were animated, not real—and this censored version is still screened occasionally on the ABC's music video series rage, including a mid-1990s episode hosted by Devo.

=== "Working in the Coal Mine" ===
New Traditionalists was originally packaged with a bonus 7-inch single of the band's cover of songwriter Allen Toussaint's "Working in the Coal Mine".

According to a 2008 interview with lead singer Mark Mothersbaugh, Devo had originally intended to include the song on the album but were thwarted by Warner Bros. The band was then approached by the makers of the animated film Heavy Metal and asked if they had a song to donate for a sequence in the film involving a house band in outer space. Devo offered them the unused "Working in the Coal Mine", and as a fluke the song ended up being the only charting song on the soundtrack album. Since the song was now a "hit", Warner Bros. pressed up thousands of two-sided 7-inch singles and included them with initial copies of the LP.

Most CD and cassette pressings of New Traditionalists include "Working in the Coal Mine" as a bonus track.

== Reception ==
Professional ratings
Review scores
Source	Rating
AllMusic	3/5 stars
Robert Christgau	B
Rolling Stone	2/5 stars

=== Critical ===
David Fricke of Rolling Stone stated, "New Traditionalists has a few obvious Top Forty finger poppers – 'Through Being Cool' (the latest Devo fight song), 'Jerkin' Back 'n' Forth' and 'Enough Said' (this year's 'Whip It') – and the slick production makes it all go down easy. But the group's increasing overuse of simplistic, droning synthesizer riffs and treadmill dance rhythms is neither trendy nor traditional. It's predictable." Robert Christgau of The Village Voice called the album "Filler plus three major songs" ("Through Being Cool", "Love Without Anger" and "Beautiful World") "each of which gets an explanatory video in concert, which with these art-school ciphers is a comfort", although he concluded that these "would not satisfy the ninnies and twits who think war toys and visual aids are evil by definition." Scott Isler of Trouser Press stated that while New Traditionalists had "a couple of attention-getting songs ('Love Without Anger,' 'Going Under,' the extraordinarily attractive 'Beautiful World')" as well as the bonus "Working in the Coal Mine" single, the majority of the album was "clinical-sounding laissez-faire techno-dance stuff, less-than-compelling lyrics set to a metronomic 4/4 beat."

In a retrospective review for AllMusic, Steve Huey opined that New Traditionalists found Devo "aghast at being pegged as a novelty act by some of their own satirical targets", and that the band "largely abandons its sense of absurdity" on the album, theorizing that they'd decided that "America's comprehension of irony was sorely lacking". While he felt the album contained "some of Devo's angriest, most embittered songs", he felt many were "unmemorable" and sported "melodic deficiencies", although he ultimately concluded that "at least half of the album is worthwhile."

=== Commercial ===
New Traditionalists was slightly less successful than the Freedom of Choice album, peaking at No. 23 on the Billboard charts, whereas Freedom of Choice had peaked at No. 22. The non-album single "Working in the Coal Mine" peaked at No. 43 on the Billboard Hot 100.

The album and its singles continued Devo's success in Australia, with "Beautiful World" peaking at No. 14 and "Working in the Coal Mine" at No. 20.

== Tour ==
The tour set was designed by Mark Mothersbaugh and Gerald Casale, and was manufactured by John Zabrucky. Modified treadmills were housed inside a temple stage set, allowing for uniform choreography by the band members, and still photos were projected behind the band. The set was plexiglass, allowing it to be illuminated by different colored lights, and the front, made of white plastic, was removable, revealing a framework.

On stage, Devo wore what were called "Utopian Boy Scout Uniforms", consisting of a gray button down shirt, gray slacks and black patent leather shoes. Professional footage was shot during the tour, but after the film crew's lighting generator clashed with the stage crew's and blew both sets of lights, an insurance claim stipulated that the footage had to be destroyed.

In 2012, Devo commemorated the New Traditionalists tour by releasing Live 1981 Seattle as a double LP for Record Store Day. The album was culled from a cassette recording from November 1981. According to Gerald Casale, "DEVO archivist Michael Pilmer (aka Devo-Obsesso), found the tape in a shoebox full of cassettes in [keyboardist and guitarist] Bob 2's home fifteen years ago, which he immediately transferred to DAT". In 2013, it was issued on CD with two bonus tracks from a performance at the Orpheum Theatre in Boston, Massachusetts on November 5, 1981.

== Track listing ==
All tracks are written by Mark Mothersbaugh and Gerald Casale, except where noted.

Side one
No.	Title	Writer(s)	Length
1.	"Through Being Cool"	Gerald Casale; Mark Mothersbaugh; Bob Mothersbaugh	3:14
2.	"Jerkin' Back 'n' Forth"		3:05
3.	"Pity You"	M. Mothersbaugh	2:47
4.	"Soft Things"		3:27
5.	"Going Under"		3:26

Side two
No.	Title	Writer(s)	Length
1.	"Race of Doom"		3:44
2.	"Love Without Anger"		2:37
3.	"The Super Thing"		4:21
4.	"Beautiful World"		3:35
5.	"Enough Said"	M. Mothersbaugh; G. Casale; General Boy	3:26
Total length:			33:28

Bonus track
No.	Title	Writer(s)	Length
11.	"Working in the Coal Mine"	Allen Toussaint	2:53

== Personnel ==
Credits adapted from Pioneers Who Got Scalped: The Anthology CD liner notes:

Devo

- Mark Mothersbaugh – vocals, keyboards, guitar
- Gerald Casale – vocals, bass guitar, keyboards
- Bob Mothersbaugh – lead guitar, vocals
- Bob Casale – rhythm guitar, keyboards, vocals
- Alan Myers – drums

Credits adapted from the original album's liner notes:

Technical

- Devo – producer, design concept
- Phil Brown – mastering
- Larry Alexander – engineer
- Karat Faye – assistant engineer
- Brent Scrivner – New Traditionalist hairdos
- John Zabrucky – New Traditionalist astronaut
- Moshe Brakha – cover photography
- Richard Seireeni – art direction
- Fran Fresquez (Narf Graphics) – Club Devo catalog

== Charts ==
=== Weekly charts ===
Chart (1981–1982)	Peak position
Australian Albums (Kent Music Report)	3
Canada Top Albums/CDs (RPM)	32
New Zealand Albums (RMNZ)	6
UK Albums (Official Charts)	50
US Billboard 200	23

=== Year-end charts ===
Chart (1982)	Position
New Zealand Albums (RMNZ)	47

== Certifications ==
Region	Certification	Certified units/sales
Australia	—	75,000+
New Zealand (RMNZ)	Gold	7,500^{^}
^{^} Shipments figures based on certification alone.

== Bibliography ==
- Devo (2018a). DEVO: The Brand. London: Rocket 88 Books Publishing. ISBN 978-1-910978-01-6.
- Devo (2018b). DEVO: Unmasked. London: Rocket 88 Books Publishing. ISBN 978-1-910978-01-6.
