= Fraidy Cat =

Fraidy Cat may refer to:

- Fraidy Cat (film), a 1942 Tom and Jerry cartoon
- Fraidy Cat, a 2008 animated short film produced by S4 Studios
- Fraidy Cat (TV series), a 1975 American children's cartoon show
- "Fraidy Cat" (Garfield and Friends), a 1988 TV episode
- "Fraidy Cat" (The Garfield Show), a 2014 TV episode

== See also ==
- Scaredy Cat, a 1948 Merrie Melodies cartoon, directed by Chuck Jones featuring Porky Pig
