= The Groovenians =

Television pilot

- Created by: Kenny Scharf
- Written by: Jordan Reichek; Michael Ryan & Scott Redman (additional writing)
- Story by: Jordan Reichek; Kenny Scharf
- Directed by: Jordan Reichek
- Voices of: Paul Reubens; Drena De Niro; Dennis Hopper; Vincent Gallo; Ann Magnuson; Debi Mazar; RuPaul; Jeff Bennett; Floyd Peterson
- Theme music composer: Pat Irwin; Kate Pierson; Fred Schneider; Cindy Wilson; Kenny Scharf
- Opening theme: "The Groovenians" by The B-52's
- Ending theme: "The Groovenians" (Instrumental)
- Composers: Mark Mothersbaugh; Additional music: Bob Casale; Albert Fox; Josh Mancell; Al Mothersbaugh; Bob Mothersbaugh; Andrew Todd; Pat Irwin
- Country of origin: United States
- Original language: English

Production
- Executive producers: Kenny Scharf; Linda Simensky; Mike Lazzo; Khaki Jones
- Producer: Jordan Reichek
- Editor: Paul D. Calder
- Running time: 23 minutes approx.
- Production companies: Cartoon Network Studios; S4 Studios

Original release
- Network: Cartoon Network
- Release: November 10, 2002

The Groovenians is an American animated television pilot created by Kenny Scharf and produced by Cartoon Network Studios. It was aired on Cartoon Network's late-night programming block Adult Swim on November 10, 2002, as a stealth premiere. It was officially aired on the network itself during the block "Cartoon Cartoon Fridays" on February 21, 2003. The pilot was panned by critics and audiences, resulting in the series not being picked up by the network.

== Plot ==
The pilot follows an adolescent couple named Jet and Glindy from a planet named Jeepers. On Jeepers, society is uniform, and artistic qualities are shunned. Jet and Glindy, however, are artists and performers who often perform on their front lawns. Their parents do not approve, and they tell Jet and Glindy that art is not everything in life. As Glindy talks to Jet about wanting to leave Jeepers, a boy named Nixon is dropped next door from a spaceship. He had been evicted from a planet called Groovenia, which he tells Jet and Glindy is a paradise for artists. He gives them his key before he is dragged into his house by his grandmother.

After being presented with options for their future, Jet and Glindy decide to leave Jeepers behind and go to Groovenia. However, Glindy's father stops them, and he, along with Glindy's mother, dictates their future; Glindy is to work at an office job, and Jet is to marry Glindy's sister, Yalda. Glindy manages to stop the wedding, and the two, along with Jet's dog, Looki, are run out by the parents and Glindy's sister, Yalda.

The three escape to the "jetport," where they board a jet to Groovenia. Upon the plane, they are greeted by the flight attendant who has a short sequence creating hype for the planet. Upon landing, Jet and Glindy meet Zazzy the Jizzerino Tree, who proclaims in rhyme that a key is needed to gain entry to Groovenia, which was given to them by Nixon earlier. They insert the key into the tree's keyhole, and she takes them to the apartment. There, they meet Lalasha, Swirly, and Suavo, the former roommates of Nixon, and introduce themselves. They proceed to spend the day partying, but as Glindy proclaims aloud, if Groovenia could possibly get any better, they are attacked by a group of robots called "Normals," and their king, Norman. The Normals and King Norman force them to pay taxes, where Suavo tells Jet and Glindy the reason why Nixon was evicted. It turns out that Nixon did not pay his taxes, and because of this, Jet and Glindy have to pay them for him. The two are attacked by King Norman, scaring Jet, which causes Glindy to become angry, and she expels King Norman and the Normals with colored paint and disco music, and the pilot ends with King Norman swearing revenge as the main characters dance.

== Voice cast ==
- Paul Reubens – Jet / The Bubbie
- Drena De Niro – Glindy
- Vincent Gallo – Nixon
- Dennis Hopper – Bori (Glindy's Dad) / King Norman
- Ann Magnuson – Dully (Glindy's Mom) / Zazzy / Lalasha
- Debi Mazar – Yalda / Swirly / Cuckoo Bird
- RuPaul – Champagne Courvoisier
- Floyd Peterson – Funbus Captain
- Jeff Bennett – Suavo

== Development ==
The Groovenians was created by Kenny Scharf, a surrealist painter from Brooklyn, New York. The art, animation, and concepts were the result of his long work experience painting pop culture in a science fictional setting; Scharf drew inspiration from Hanna-Barbera's animated sitcom The Jetsons.

Animation services was provided with computer-generated imagery via S4 Studios, while production was handled by Cartoon Network Studios. Scharf wrote the story with Jordan Reichek, the director of the pilot for Invader Zim, who also held the roles of director, producer, and storyboard artist. Several prominent artists of new wave music contributed as composers for the pilot's music: three members of The B-52's (Kate Pierson, Fred Schneider, and Cindy Wilson) for the soundtrack, Mark Mothersbaugh for the background, and Bob Casale from Devo working with some musicians of Mutato Muzika working on background and additional music. After the pilot was rejected by Cartoon Network, Scharf tried to pitch it to MTV and VH1, but it never materialized.

== Reception ==
The Groovenians never picked up as the full series due to negative reception from critics and audiences. Despite this, it was nominated at 30th Annie Awards as "Best Animated Short Subject".
