= Greatest Misses =

Greatest Misses may refer to:

- Greatest Misses (Devo album), 1990
- Greatest Misses (Public Enemy album), 1992
