= Peek-a-Boo! =

Single by Devo

from the album Oh, No! It's Devo
- B-side: "Find Out"
- Released: September 22, 1982
- Genre: New wave; synth-pop
- Length: 3:01
- Label: Warner Bros.
- Songwriters: Mark Mothersbaugh; Gerald Casale
- Producer: Roy Thomas Baker

Devo singles chronology
"Jerkin' Back 'n' Forth" (1981)	"Peek-a-Boo!" (1982)	"That's Good" (1982)

Music video
- "Peek-a-Boo!" on YouTube

"Peek-a-Boo!" is a song by American new wave band Devo, written by vocalist Mark Mothersbaugh and bassist Gerald Casale. It appears on their fifth studio album Oh, No! It's Devo (1982). The single features the non-album track, "Find Out" as its B-side, which was also released as a bonus track on the Infinite Zero Archive/American Recordings CD reissue of the album. "Find Out" was later re-recorded by Devo's bassist Gerald Casale's solo project Jihad Jerry & the Evildoers for the studio album Mine Is Not a Holy War (2006).

== Composition and lyrics ==
"Peek-a Boo!" is a new wave and synth-pop song, that according to Gerald Casale from the audio commentary of the band's film, The Complete Truth About De-Evolution, is about Devo's circus-like look and the dark side of human nature, the side we try to keep secret, the side we try to deny, in this Christian world where we're only supposed to have happy endings and only supposed to be good, and instead Devo is dealing with what evil is here in a very light-hearted manner."

== Music video ==
The music video for "Peek-a-Boo!" eschewed Devo's previous narrative style for a basic performance against a bluescreen background displaying related visuals to the song. This was intended to replicate the band's intentions for the forthcoming tour for those who would be unable to attend. Some of the imagery on the bluescreen was made by Digital Productions in Los Angeles, which was one of the few companies in the United States to have a Cray X-MP supercomputer, which was the world's most powerful computer from 1983–85.

According to Mark Mothersbaugh, the Devil faces shown in some parts of the video were a couple of black velvet paintings that the band had found in Tijuana and they had them animated. Also notable is the re-appearance of dancer Craig Allen Rothwell, who played the "Spazz Attack" character that appeared in Devo's music video for (I Can't Get No) Satisfaction.

== Track listing ==
- 12" single
1. "Peek-a-Boo!" (Dance Velocity) – 4:36
2. "Peek-a-Boo!" (Devo Dub) – 5:24
3. "Find Out" – 3:22
- 7" single
1. "Peek-a-Boo!" – 3:01
2. "Find Out" – 3:22

== Chart performance ==
Chart performance for "Peek-a-Boo!"
Chart (1982–1983)	Peak position
Australia (Kent Music Report)	45
US Billboard Bubbling Under the Hot 100	6
US Hot Dance Club Songs	13
