= Muzik for Insomniaks, Volume 1 and Volume 2 =

- Volume 1

Studio album by Mark Mothersbaugh
- Released: 1988
- Recorded: 1985–1988
- Studio: Devo Studios (Marina del Rey, California)
- Genres: Muzak; new age; Progressive electronic
- Labels: Enigma; Rykodisc
- Producer: Mark Mothersbaugh

Mark Mothersbaugh chronology
Muzik for Insomniaks, Volume 1 and Volume 2 (1988)	Joyeux Mutato (1999)

Muzik for Insomniaks
- Volume 2

Muzik for Insomniaks, Volume 1 and Volume 2 is a two-studio album series by Devo's co-founder and lead vocalist Mark Mothersbaugh. They were both originally released in 1988, the same year as Devo's seventh studio album Total Devo, on the labels Enigma and Rykodisc. The albums consisted entirely of instrumentals that were performed in the style of easy listening muzak or new-age music similar to Devo's compilation album E-Z Listening Disc (1987), released the previous year. Both of the albums were produced, written, arranged, programmed and performed by Mothersbaugh himself mostly using the Fairlight CMI and was engineered and mixed by former Devo keyboardist and guitarist Bob Casale. Mothersbaugh once described the albums as "M. C. Escher meets wallpaper."

Gábor Csupó co-creator of the animated television series Rugrats, had called Mothersbaugh and asked if he could use the music from Muzik for Insomniaks for Rugrats, however, Mothersbaugh proposed that he could compose new songs instead, and, after one meeting, Csupó agreed.

Muzik for Insomniaks is also the title of an album by Mothersbaugh released in Japan in 1985. This was released as part of the cassette magazine TRA after Mothersbaugh was given copies of the magazine by Hajime Tachibana, and asked if he could contribute. Only 10,000 copies were made of each TRA release, with Mothersbaugh's album also packaged with a deck of playing cards.

== Track listing ==
All tracks are written by Mark Mothersbaugh.

Muzik for Insomniaks Volume 1
No.	Title	Length
1.	"Osoy"	2:03
2.	"Chechi"	3:42
3.	"Rojaero"	3:35
4.	"Mayoma"	4:04
5.	"Lifelong"	3:24
6.	"XP25"	5:33
7.	"XP39"	9:39
8.	"XP26"	3:34
9.	"XP29"	5:22
10.	"XP27"	11:19
11.	"XP28"	9:10
12.	"XP32"	6:31
13.	"XP31"	3:38
14.	"Index"	2:42

Muzik for Insomniaks Volume 2
No.	Title	Length
1.	"Ugo"	4:20
2.	"Slactime"	6:58
3.	"Movmnt"	4:12
4.	"XP105"	4:32
5.	"XP137"	4:09
6.	"Dayone"	8:15
7.	"Chance"	4:24
8.	"XP104"	5:56
9.	"Mallota"	3:38
10.	"Barcelon"	3:32
11.	"Niberia"	2:20
12.	"Keikavid"	3:47
13.	"Bonzaiko"	2:45
14.	"XP1010"	4:22
15.	"Trebrene"	6:03
16.	"Index"	3:20

== Personnel ==
Credits are adapted from both of the album's liner notes which are identical.

- Mark Mothersbaugh – Fairlight CMI Series IIx programming; Roland keyboards; arrangements

Production team

- Mark Mothersbaugh – producer; art direction
- Bob Casale – engineering; mixing
- Patrick Pending – art direction
- David Lomeli – art assistance
- Jonathan Gelber – photography
