= Through Being Cool (Devo song) =

Single by Devo

from the album New Traditionalists
- Released: September 18, 1981
- Genre: New wave; synth-pop
- Length: 3:14
- Label: Warner Bros.
- Songwriters: Gerald Casale; Mark Mothersbaugh; Bob Mothersbaugh
- Producer: Devo

Devo singles chronology
"Freedom of Choice" (1980)	"Through Being Cool" (1981)	"Beautiful World" (1981)

Music video
- "Through Being Cool (2023 Remaster)" on YouTube

"Through Being Cool" is a song by American new wave band Devo, written by Mark Mothersbaugh, Gerald Casale, and Bob Mothersbaugh. It appears on their fourth studio album New Traditionalists (1981). The song was a direct attack on new fans who did not understand Devo's message. It was featured in the 1981 animated film Heavy Metal, and alternative rock band They Might Be Giants performed it on the 2005 superhero comedy Sky High. It is also used as a throwback in NBA 2K8 (2007).

Record World said that "a boss bass groove sets the pace for dancers while the rhythm guitars add a funky flavor and keyboard melodies go after pop ears."

== Promotional music video ==
The music video had Devo taking a limited role, focusing on a team of kids clad in Devo "Action Vests" attacking arrogant and ignorant people with "spudguns".

== Chart performance ==
Chart (1981–1982)	Position
US Billboard Bubbling Under the Hot 100	7
US Hot Dance Club Songs	32
