= Working in the Coal Mine =

1966 song performed by Lee Dorsey

- Original vinyl release

Single by Lee Dorsey

from the album Working in the Coal Mine - Holy Cow
- B-side: "Mexico"
- Released: July 1966
- Genre: R&B
- Length: 2:42
- Label: Amy
- Songwriter: Allen Toussaint
- Producers: Allen Toussaint and Marshall Sehorn

Lee Dorsey singles chronology
"Confusion" (1966)	"Working in the Coal Mine" (1966)	"Holy Cow" (1966)

"Working in the Coal Mine" is a song with music and lyrics by the American musician and record producer Allen Toussaint. It was an international hit for Lee Dorsey in 1966, and has been recorded by other musicians including Devo in 1981.

== Lee Dorsey original version ==
After Toussaint returned to New Orleans from the U.S. Army, in which he served from 1963 to 1965, he formed a production company, Sansu (also known as "Tou-Sea Productions"), with partner Marshall Sehorn. He produced a number of singles performed by Lee Dorsey in 1965 and 1966, including "Ride Your Pony" and "Working in the Coal Mine".

Written, arranged and produced by Toussaint, the song concerns the suffering of a man who rises before 5 o'clock each morning in order to work in a coal mine. He works five days a week, where the conditions are very harsh and dangerous, but which offer the only prospect of paid employment. The singer repeatedly asks the Lord, "How long can this go on?" and complains that when the weekend arrives, he is too exhausted to have any fun. In the instrumental section, as in the song's fade, he says: "Lord, I'm so tired / How long can this go on?" The song features the sound of a pickaxe clinking, as if the musicians are working in a mine. Toussaint later said "There wasn’t as much percussion as you might think on there. It was a certain drummer and we had my brother hit the mic' stand with a drum stick for the pick sound. Those were the two percussion instruments."

The recording took place at Cosimo Matassa's Governor Nichols Street studio in the French Quarter of New Orleans. Musicians included guitarist Roy Montrell, drummer Albert "June" Gardner, and bassist Walter Payton.

It was a hit for Lee Dorsey, released on Amy Records (catalogue number 958), and entered the U.S. Billboard Hot 100 on July 23, 1966, eventually peaking at #8, while reaching #5 on the Billboard R&B chart. It also reached #8 on the UK Singles Chart.

Toussaint said that neither he nor Dorsey had ever been down a coal mine: "We didn’t know anything about a coal mine". He said of Dorsey:

"He was very good to work with. Very inspiring because he had such a happiness about him. He loved what he was doing when he was singing. He was a body and fender man when he wasn’t singing and even at his peak, when he would come off the road at the end of a successful tour, he would go and get into his grease clothes, his dirty work gear and go and work on cars. Straightening out fenders and painting bodywork. But really it was his finest hour when he was singing. He was a very good person for me to work with and he totally trusted me every step of the way."

Over time, Dorsey's version of "Working in the Coal Mine" has been featured in many movies and television programs, including Where the Action Is (1966), Everybody's All-American (1988), Moonlighting (1988), Waiting for the Light (1990), Married... with Children (1990), The Wonder Years (1990), The Fresh Prince of Bel-Air (1993), Casino (1995), Secret Diary of a Call Girl (2010), Muppets Most Wanted (2014), The Simpsons (2019) and The Conners (2019).

=== Chart history ===
Chart (1966–1967)	Peak position
U.S. Billboard Hot 100	8
US (Billboard) Best Selling Rhythm & Blues Singles	5
UK Singles Chart	8

== Devo version ==
"Working in the Coal Mine"

Single by Devo

from the album Heavy Metal: Music from the Motion Picture
- B-side: "Planet Earth"
- Released: August 17, 1981
- Genre: New wave
- Length: 2:47
- Label: Warner Bros.; Asylum
- Songwriter: Allen Toussaint
- Producer: Robert Margouleff

Devo singles chronology
"Beautiful World" (1981)	"Working in the Coal Mine" (1981)	"Peek-a-Boo!" (1982)

In 1981, a Devo cover version was included as a bonus 7" single packaged with their album New Traditionalists. This version was used in the end titles of the film Heavy Metal. It entered Billboard Sept 5, 1981, reaching No. 43 on the Hot 100, and was also a Top 10 single in New Zealand. It has also been used in the film Employee of the Month and as theme music for the show Working.

=== Chart performance ===
Chart (1981)	Peak position
Australia (Kent Music Report)	20
Canada RPM Top Singles	17
New Zealand	8
U.S. Billboard Hot 100	43
U.S. Billboard Hot Dance Club Play	30
U.S. Billboard Mainstream Rock Tracks	53
U.S. Cash Box Top 100	36

== Other versions ==
- During an unreleased jam session with Ringo Starr, Cat Stevens recorded his own version of the song.
- The song was covered by The Judds in 1985, on their album Rockin' with the Rhythm. Over time, it became a fan favorite of the country duo.
- The song is also included as a part of a medley performed by Allen Toussaint of some of his hits in the 2005 documentary film Make It Funky!, which presents a history of New Orleans music and its influence on rhythm and blues, rock and roll, funk and jazz.
