= Oh, No! It's Devo =

Studio album by Devo
- Released: October 27, 1982
- Recorded: May–September 1982
- Studio: Cherokee (Hollywood)
- Genres: New wave; synth-pop
- Length: 32:14
- Label: Warner Bros.
- Producer: Roy Thomas Baker

Devo chronology
New Traditionalists (1981)	Oh, No! It's Devo (1982)	Shout (1984)

Singles from Oh No, It's Devo
- 1. "Peek-a-Boo!" Released: September 22, 1982; 2. "That's Good" Released: November 24, 1982

Oh, No! It's Devo is the fifth studio album by American new wave band Devo, released in 1982 by Warner Bros. Records. The album was recorded over a period of four months, between May and September 1982, at Cherokee Studios in Hollywood, Los Angeles, and was produced by Roy Thomas Baker.

== Background ==
Oh, No! It's Devo features an even greater reliance on programmed synthesizers and drum machines than its predecessor, New Traditionalists (1981). DJ Pangburn of Reverb.com noted that these elements, "combined with the minimal use of guitars, gives the record a metronomic, roboticized feel."

According to a 1982 interview with lead vocalist Mark Mothersbaugh, the album was titled Oh, No! It's Devo because "there are many people out there who, when they hear we're around again or have one more album coming out, that is their reaction." In later interviews, Devo's co-founder and bass guitarist Gerald Casale stated that the album was born out of critical reviews in which the band were alternately described as both "fascists" and "clowns". In response, the band decided to make an album that would answer the question, "what would a record sound like by fascist clowns?"

== Composition ==
"Peek-a-Boo!", based on a "scary" sequencer line from Mark Mothersbaugh, featured lyrics inspired by Casale's former college philosophy professor, who had taught about Carl Jung's theories on the duality of human nature. "Big Mess" was inspired by letters sent to a game show host by someone using the name "Cowboy Kim".

"I Desire" brought the band controversy, as the lyrics were taken directly from a poem written by John Hinckley Jr., who had attempted to assassinate U.S. President Ronald Reagan in an effort to impress actress Jodie Foster. The band had first read the poem in the National Enquirer and thought it was "pretty great", despite the source. Casale later said that Hinckley was "quite proud" of the song, but "completely didn't understand that what we did was invert it. We knew how nuts he was, of course, and the third verse I added clearly turns the mirror on the psycho." While Foster gave the band her blessing to use the lyrics, the FBI issued them several warnings.

== Release and promotion ==
Oh, No! It's Devo was released on October 27, 1982. The LP jacket had a die-cut stand on the back, so it could be stood up like a picture frame.

Devo supported the album with a North American tour. This included 20 minutes of the band performing in front of rear projection video, synched to sequencer lines and a click track, on a screen 25 feet high and 17 feet wide, which the band would interact with. The equipment for the tour cost $40,000. Animation was done by John Whitney, Jr. of Digital Productions on a Cray computer. For this album and its subsequent videos and tour, the band wore white "spud ring" collars, which were initially devised in order to make it easier to extract the band's heads when shooting green screen segments for "Time Out for Fun". These collars were designed by Brent Scrivner.

I wanted to make the experience seamless between seeing a DEVO video on TV and then going to see DEVO perform. So we shot background plates and then performed in front of a green screen. We edited all of our performance angles with the matching background angles and married them so when you saw us live, everything was in sync behind us. Obviously the only editing going on was in the audience's eye, but it was exactly what they saw in the video, performed in exactly the same way, so there was a real connection. Nobody had done it before, and it was hard to do; we had to use film technology.

— Gerald Casale; Devo: Unmasked (2018)

The band produced three music videos for the album: "Time Out for Fun," "That's Good" and "Peek-a-Boo!". The band integrated aspects from their concert performances—including green screen, live-action film, animation and early CGI—into the videos, eschewing the "B-roll interstitials" and other techniques common to music videos of the era.

The video for "That's Good" ran into censorship troubles on MTV, as the juxtaposition of a cartoon french fry penetrating the hole of a doughnut and quickly cutting to a writhing, smiling nude woman, shot from the neck up, was considered too risqué for airplay. Casale later recalled a contentious phone call with MTV co-founder Les Garland, in which he asked Garland, "'What about that Billy Idol video you have and the girls are in skin-tight pants and their asses are full on in the screen and his head is between her legs and then somebody slaps her ass? What about that?' He goes, 'we're talking about you, we're not talking about them.'" Casale eventually acquiesced and edited the video, which he later regretted, as "the song was going down in the charts, not up."

== Critical reception ==
Professional ratings
Review scores
Source	Rating
AllMusic	2.5/5 stars
Robert Christgau	B+
Rolling Stone	3/5 stars
Spin Alternative Record Guide	8/10

Debby Miller of Rolling Stone observed that "Devo again proves to be at their best with a singular brand of dance song—sort of a Chubby Checker-in-space idea, with loony instructions set to a mechanized stomp." However, she cited "Peek-a-Boo!" and "That's Good" as the album's sole highlights, adding, "it's getting harder to take the whole Devo package—the dumbbell retrograde-evolution philosophy and all the promotional merchandise." Robert Christgau of The Village Voice concluded that the band "never sounded wimpier, but they've never sounded catchier either, and with this band wimpiness has a comic purpose." Trouser Press felt the album was "pointlessly produced by Roy Thomas Baker" and "failed to slow the creative slide." The Globe and Mail determined that the band and Baker captured "a full and satisfying sound without losing the spastic mechanical repetitiveness for which Devo is known."

In retrospective reviews, Steve Huey of AllMusic praised the album's "quality singles" but felt that Baker's production "smooths out any remaining edges in the band's sound", noting its "colder-sounding digital synths" and "thudding electronic percussion, which contributes heavily to the album's overall feeling of bloodlessness". The Spin Alternative Record Guide deemed "That's Good" and "Big Mess" "Devo at its most pointed and charming."

== Track listing ==
All tracks are written by Mark Mothersbaugh and Gerald Casale, except where noted.

Side one
No.	Title	Length
1.	"Time Out for Fun"	2:48
2.	"Peek-a-Boo!"	3:01
3.	"Out of Sync"	3:34
4.	"Explosions"	3:01
5.	"That's Good"	3:23

Side two
No.	Title	Writer(s)	Length
1.	"Patterns"		2:57
2.	"Big Mess"		2:42
3.	"Speed Racer"	Mark Mothersbaugh	2:38
4.	"What I Must Do"		2:34
5.	"I Desire"	John Hinckley Jr.; Gerald Casale; M. Mothersbaugh	3:13
6.	"Deep Sleep"		3:24
Total length:			32:14

== Personnel ==
Credits adapted from Pioneers Who Got Scalped: The Anthology CD liner notes:

Devo

- Mark Mothersbaugh – vocals, keyboards, guitar
- Gerald Casale – vocals, bass guitar, keyboards
- Bob Mothersbaugh – lead guitar, vocals
- Bob Casale – rhythm guitar, keyboards, vocals
- Alan Myers – drums

Credits adapted from the original album's liner notes:

Additional musician

- Annerose Bücklers – backing vocals on "Deep Sleep"

Technical

- Roy Thomas Baker – producer
- Gordon Fordyce – engineer
- Stuart Graham – assistant engineer
- George Marino – mastering
- Erik Arnesen – cover photography
- Devo Inc. – graphic concept
- Rick Seireeni – art direction
- Brent Scrivner – "Spudring" manufacturing

== Charts ==
Chart (1982)	Peak position
Australian Albums (Kent Music Report)	57
New Zealand Albums (RMNZ)	10
Swedish Albums (Sverigetopplistan)	38
US Billboard 200	47

Chart (2022)	Peak position
US Top Album Sales (Billboard)	54

== Bibliography ==
- Devo (2018). DEVO: Unmasked. London: Rocket 88 Books Publishing. ISBN 978-1-910978-01-6.
