= That's Good (song) =

Single by Devo

from the album Oh, No! It's Devo
- Released: November 24, 1982
- Genre: New wave; synth-pop
- Length: 3:23
- Label: Warner Bros.
- Songwriters: Mark Mothersbaugh; Gerald Casale
- Producer: Roy Thomas Baker

Devo singles chronology
"Peek-a-Boo!" (1982)	"That's Good" (1982)	"Theme from Doctor Detroit" (1983)

Music video
- "That's Good" on YouTube

"That's Good" is a song by the American new wave band Devo, written by Mark Mothersbaugh and Gerald Casale. It appears on their fifth studio album, Oh, No! It's Devo (1982). According to Casale, "the lyrics deal with the ambiguity that if everybody wants what you want, how can everybody have it if everybody wants it and what happens when everybody tries to get it, and maybe you should change what you want."

Billboard called it "an almost-straightforward rocker" that is similar to "Whip It".

== Promotional music video ==
The music video for "That's Good" eschewed Devo's previous narrative style for a basic performance against a bluescreen background displaying related visuals to the song. This was intended to replicate the band's intentions for the forthcoming tour for those who would be unable to attend. The video for "That's Good" was one of the first videos that ran into censorship troubles on MTV. The juxtaposition of the image in a cartoon of a french fry penetrating the hole of a doughnut and then quickly cut to a writhing, smiling nude woman, shot from the neck up, was considered too risqué for airplay. In an interview with band member and video director Gerald Casale for the book Devo's Freedom of Choice,

"We got this call from [MTV co-founder] Les Garland, He was like, 'Look, we know what you're trying to do here.' I go, What do you mean? He goes, 'Ya know, when that cartoon French fry glides through that cartoon donut and then it's with the girl looking happy. You can have the French fry, or you can have the donut, but you can't have the French fry and the donut, Otherwise, you can't cut to the girl.' And I go, 'But what about when the French fry hits the donut and breaks in half and she's sad?' And he goes 'Alright you little smart ass.' It was horrible. Then I go, 'What about that Billy Idol video you have and the girls are in skin-tight pants and their asses are full on in the screen and his head is between her legs and then somebody slaps her ass? What about that?' He goes, 'we're talking about you, we're not talking about them."

Casale eventually relented and made significant cuts to the video, which he regrets because by then, "the song was going down in the charts, not up."

== Track listing ==
- 12" single
1. "That's Good" – 3:23
2. "Speed Racer" (long edit) – 3:42
- 7" single
1. "That's Good" – 2:59
2. "What I Must Do" – 2:34

== Chart performance ==
Chart performance for "That's Good"
Chart (1982–1983)	Peak position
US Billboard Bubbling Under the Hot 100	104
US Hot Dance Club Songs	6
