= Digital Productions =

Computer Company

- Industry: Animation
- Founded: 1982; 44 years ago
- Founder: John Whitney, Jr. Gary Demos
- Defunct: January 1, 1986; 40 years ago

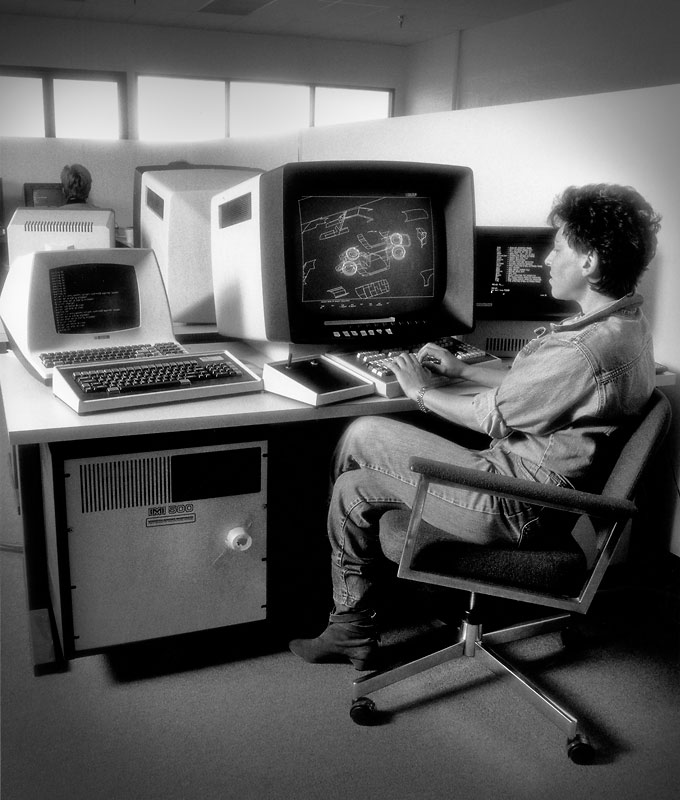
Choreographing a scene from The Last Starfighter on an IMI-500 workstation, 1983

Digital Productions was a computer animation company in Los Angeles, California, that produced advertisements and special effects for films in the 1980s.

The company was founded by John Whitney, Jr. and Gary Demos in 1982, following their departure from Triple-I. They received financial support from Control Data Corporation. Whitney and Demos felt that greater computer power was needed to produce effects such as those being made by Triple-I for Tron; Digital Productions became famous for using a Cray X-MP supercomputer to render their animations. The company referred to its animation as "Digital Scene Simulation".

In 1982, using the Cray computer, Whitney created animations for the band Devo, which appeared in their music videos and in rear projections on stage for their Oh, No! It's Devo album and tour.

Digital Productions' first feature film project was the hyperspace sequence in the film The Ice Pirates (1984), after which they created 27 minutes of animation, in 300 scenes, for the film The Last Starfighter (1984). Each frame of the animation contained an average of 250,000 polygons, and had a resolution of 3000 x 5000 36-bit pixels; they claimed that the imagery was 50 times more complex than the graphics in previous feature films. They estimated that using computer animation required only half the time, and one half to one third the cost, that would have been required if then-traditional methods had been used.

Other work done by the company includes effects for 2010: The Year We Make Contact (1984), Mick Jagger's "Hard Woman" music video (1985) and Labyrinth (1986).

In 1986, Digital Productions was bought out by Omnibus Computer Graphics in Toronto for 6 million US$, who also took over Robert Abel and Associates (7.3 million US$) and purchased Triple-I's Foonly computer, all using money from Royal Bank of Canada. In May of the following year, Omnibus Computer Graphics defaulted on its loan agreements and, with 30 million US$ debt, closed its doors in October.
