= Beautiful World (Devo song) =

1981 single by Devo

Single by Devo

from the album New Traditionalists
- Released: October 14, 1981
- Genre: New wave; synth-pop; post-punk
- Length: 3:35
- Label: Warner Bros.
- Songwriters: Gerald Casale; Mark Mothersbaugh
- Producer: Devo

Devo singles chronology
"Through Being Cool" (1981)	"Beautiful World" (1981)	"Working in the Coal Mine" (1981)

"Beautiful World" is a song by American new wave band Devo, written by bassist Gerald Casale and vocalist Mark Mothersbaugh. It was released as the second single from their fourth studio album, New Traditionalists (1981). While most of its songs are darker and more direct than on previous Devo albums, "Beautiful World," is an exception, with a message that seems optimistic at first but changes as the song progresses. This is also demonstrated in the song's music video.

In addition to the 7-inch single, "Beautiful World" was also released as a picture disc. This version features the same image of a paper mask of a cosmonaut's face as the standard single sleeve, but is cut in the shape of his head and includes a different B-side: the spoken word "Nu-tra Speaks (New Traditionalist Man)."

== Reception ==
Record World thought the "positive pop piece" continued the band's message of devolution in the form of "a polished, multi-format rocker," while Tim Griffin of Cabinet Magazine called it a "post-punk, tongue-in-cheek number."

== Music video ==
The music video was inspired by the works of experimental film collagist Bruce Conner. The video features the character Booji Boy prominently, as he initially watches scenes of beautiful women, futuristic cars, and other happy elements, which by the end of the song have been replaced by images of race riots, the Ku Klux Klan, World War I, famine in Africa, car crashes and nuclear explosions, putting a much darker slant on the song's lyrics as Casale sings "It's a beautiful world, For you / It's a beautiful world, Not me."

== Track listing ==
7-inch single
No.	Title	Length
1.	"Beautiful World"	3:32
2.	"Enough Said"	3:25

Picture disc
No.	Title	Length
1.	"Beautiful World"	3:32
2.	"Nu-tra Speaks (New Traditionalist Man)"	2:16

== Chart performance ==
Chart (1981–1982)	Position
US Billboard Bubbling Under the Hot 100	102
Australia ARIA Top 100	14
New Zealand RIANZ Top 50	15

== Cover versions ==
- Indie rock band Harvey Danger
- Synth-pop band Information Society, with vocals by Gerald Casale of Devo.
- Rap rock group Rage Against the Machine on their final studio album Renegades
