= S4 Studios =

S4 Studios, LLC
- Founded: 1999; 26 years ago in Van Nuys, California
- Founders: Geoffrey Kater; Dale Hendrickson
- Headquarters: Hollywood, California, United States
- Website: s4studios.com

S4 Studios, LLC is a multidisciplinary broadcast design, animation and visual effects studio, founded in 1999 by Geoffrey Kater and Dale Hendrickson, augmented two years later by Larry Le Francis. The company is named after a highly sensitive and purportedly extraterrestrial alien research complex located within the super-secret U.S. government base Area 51. Kater, a futurist designer, came from Saban Entertainment. Le Francis was an animation series producer at Klasky Csupo, Inc. and Nickelodeon. Hendrickson designed some 2,000 characters for Fox TV’s The Simpsons during his seven years as the series’ Character Design Supervisor. He left S4 Studios in 2006. Originally located in Van Nuys, California, the company relocated to Hollywood, California in 2004.

== History ==
S4 Studios’ first major project in 1999 was The Groovenians, a one-off half-hour 3D animated pilot for Cartoon Network based on characters created by Kenny Scharf and featuring music from Devo and the B-52's. While the pilot did not go to series, it did lead to other long-form projects, including Wild Animal Baby Explorers, a series of six mixed-media 3D/Flash animation and live action direct to video children's specials for the National Wildlife Federation, co produced with Korea's Sunwoo Entertainment.

In 2001, Sony Computer Entertainment of America hired S4 Studios to produce a series of Flash-animated webisodes to cross-promote Twisted Metal: Black (often referred to as "TM:B"), the PlayStation 2 incarnation of the Twisted Metal series of car combat video games. This led to further diversification, and in 2002, the company began to work in concert with trailer houses such as Aspect Ratio and The Cimarron Group to provide visual effects shots for trailers. In 2006, a niche-marketed division, S4 VFX, was formed to produce MPAA-certified fixes such as object removal and replacement within trailers to accommodate a wide release of PG-rated motion pictures in American cinemas.

In 2006, S4 Studios partner Geoffrey Kater wrote and illustrated a pair of companion books, Design First for 3D Artists, through Wordware Publishing, and the Design First for 3D Sketchbook.

In 2007, S4 Studios established themselves in the emerging HDTV market, creating a series of original branding campaigns for NBC Universal’s Emerging Networks division, including launches for Chiller Network, Sleuth, and Universal HD, the division's umbrella network. In 2008, the studio wrote and produced Fraidy Cat, their first self-created Flash Animation short film.

== Sources and references ==
William Vaughan of NewTek Interviews Geoffrey Kater, S4 Studios

Animation Industry Database

S4 Studios on Spike TV

Paramount Pictures News

Geoffrey Kater at 2007 Los Angeles Animation Festival

3D World Magazine

Review of Design First for 3D Artists

Review of Design First for 3D Artists

TM Alliance
