= Bob Casale =

American musician (1952–2014)

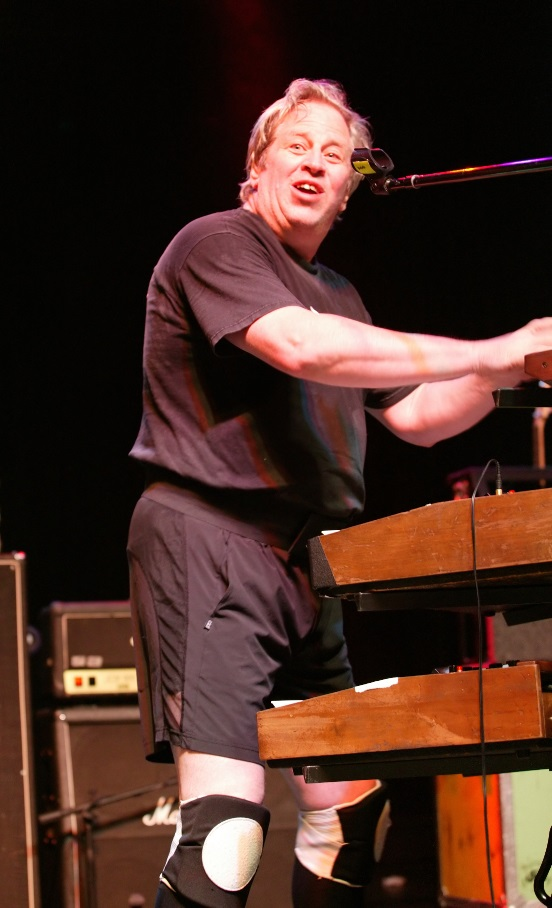
- Casale performing live, 2008

Background information
- Also known as: Bob 2
- Born: Robert Edward Pizzute Jr. July 14, 1952; Kent, Ohio, U.S.
- Died: February 17, 2014 (aged 61) Los Angeles, California, U.S.
- Genres: New wave; punk rock; post-punk; electropunk; art punk; synth-pop; electronic rock; film score
- Occupations: Musician; composer; record producer; audio engineer
- Instruments: Guitar; synthesizer; keyboards; vocals
- Years active: 1973–2014
- Formerly of: Devo

Robert Edward Casale Jr. (né Pizzute; July 14, 1952 – February 17, 2014), or "Bob 2", was an American musician, composer and record producer. He came to prominence in the late 1970s as the rhythm guitarist and keyboardist of the new wave band Devo, which released a Top 20 hit in 1980 with the single "Whip It". The band has maintained a cult following throughout its existence. He was the younger brother of their co-founder and bass guitarist Gerald Casale.

== Early years ==
Robert Edward Pizzute Jr. was born on July 14, 1952, in Kent, Ohio. He was born with the last name Pizzute because his father had legally changed his name from Robert Edward Casale to that of his foster parents. In the same year as Bob's birth, his father changed his name back to his birth name. Casale graduated from Theodore Roosevelt High School in 1970 and originally trained as a radiographer.

== Career ==
=== Devo ===
In early 1970, Bob Lewis and Gerald Casale formed the idea of the "devolution" of the human race after Casale's friend Jeffrey Miller was killed by Ohio National Guardsmen during the Kent State shootings. Casale joined Devo in 1973, after being recruited by his brother Gerald. After the band underwent a few line-up changes, Bob Casale became part of the most popular five-piece incarnation, which consisted of two sets of brothers, the Mothersbaughs (Mark and Bob) and the Casales (Gerald and Bob), along with drummer Alan Myers. Casale later claimed that they formed the band because "it was a more immediate way of self-expression that required less money and no outside permission."

Following the commercial failure of their sixth studio album Shout, Warner Bros. dropped Devo. Shortly after, claiming to feel creatively unfulfilled, Alan Myers left the band, causing the remaining band members to abandon the plans for a Shout video LP, as well as a tour. In the interim, Casale began a career as an audio engineer. In 1987, Devo reformed with new drummer David Kendrick. The band stopped performing in 1991, but reformed as a musical act in 1995. Around this time, members of Devo appeared in the film The Spirit of '76 but without Bob Mothersbaugh.

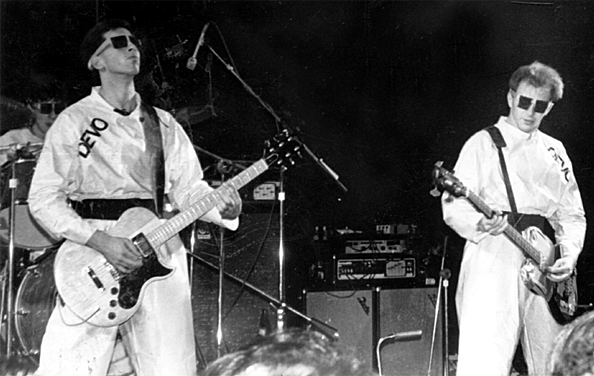
Devo performing live in Atlanta, Georgia, 1978: Bob Casale and Gerald Casale

In Devo concerts, Casale played the lead and rhythm guitar and keyboards while also working with MIDI sampling. He also sang backing vocals, both on albums and at live shows.

=== Other work ===
As Devo's mainstream popularity waned during the mid-1980s and its various members began working on side projects, Casale transitioned to audio engineering and record production. He engineered and mixed Mark Mothersbaugh's debut solo studio album Muzik for Insomniaks in 1985, which was later expanded and released as two CDs in 1988. In 1986, Casale produced and engineered Martini Ranch's debut EP "How Can the Labouring Man Find Time for Self-Culture?" which also featured Alan Myers on percussion and Mark Mothersbaugh on keyboards and in the late summer of 1986 he engineered the debut solo studio album for the Police's guitarist Andy Summers, recorded at Devo Studios in California. XYZ, featuring songs written and sung by Summers, was then released in 1987.

In 1989, Bob Casale and other members of Devo were involved in the project Visiting Kids, releasing a self-titled EP on the New Rose label in 1990. The band featured Mark Mothersbaugh's then-wife Nancye Ferguson, as well as David Kendrick, Bob Mothersbaugh and Bob's daughter Alex Mothersbaugh. Their record was produced by Bob Casale and Mark Mothersbaugh and Mark also co-wrote some of the songs. Visiting Kids appeared on the soundtrack to the film Rockula (1990), as well as on the Late Show with David Letterman. A promotional video was filmed for the song "Trilobites".

Casale later became a part of the musical production group Mutato Muzika with other members of Devo.

As audio engineering and record production opportunities expanded for Casale and bandmate Mark Mothersbaugh, Casale began working for television and movies, including Four Rooms, Happy Gilmore, Rushmore, The Royal Tenenbaums and Rugrats Go Wild.

== Death ==
On February 17, 2014, Casale died at the age of 61, in Los Angeles, California, due to heart failure. According to his brother Gerald, he went to the emergency room because he was coughing up blood. He was scheduled for tests and his family went home. During the tests, Casale became "agitated" and was given a sedative, after which his blood pressure plunged. He was given epinephrine. When his heart stopped, the medical staff was unable to get it started again. He was survived by his wife Lisa; his brother Gerald; three children (Alex, Samantha, and Andrew, who is his biological French son whom he had met a few years earlier); and his granddaughter.

Devo toured the U.S. and Canada in June and July 2014, playing ten dates consisting of their "experimental music" composed and recorded from 1974 to 1978. Planned as a 40th anniversary tour, this outing was billed as the "Hardcore Devo" tour. Partial proceeds for the ten shows went to support Casale's family.

Casale was cremated. His remains were placed in a 3D-printed urn shaped like a Devo energy dome.

== Soundtracks ==
=== Television ===
Years	Title
1992–2000	Rugrats
2003	The Groovenians

=== Film ===
Year	Title	Director(s)	Studio(s)
1995	Four Rooms	Allison Anders; Alexandre Rockwell; Robert Rodriguez; Quentin Tarantino	A Band Apart
1996	Happy Gilmore	Dennis Dugan	Universal Pictures
1998	Rushmore	Wes Anderson	Touchstone Pictures
1999	Drop Dead Gorgeous	Michael Patrick Jann	New Line Cinema
2000	The Adventures of Rocky and Bullwinkle	Des McAnuff	TriBeCa Productions; Jay Ward Productions; Classic Media
2001	The Royal Tenenbaums	Wes Anderson	Touchstone Pictures
2003	Good Boy!	John Hoffman	Jim Henson Pictures
2003	A Guy Thing	Chris Koch	David Ladd Films
2003	Thirteen	Catherine Hardwicke	Working Title Films
2003	Rugrats Go Wild	Norton Virgien; John Eng	Paramount Pictures; Klasky Csupo
2004	Envy	Barry Levinson	Castle Rock Entertainment; Baltimore/Spring Creek Pictures
2005	The Big White	Mark Mylod	Capitol Films; VIP Medienfonds 2 Ascendant
2005	Herbie: Fully Loaded	Angela Robinson	Walt Disney Pictures; Robert Simonds Productions
2006	The Dog Problem	Scott Caan	Thousand Words
2006	How to Eat Fried Worms	Bob Dolman	New Line Cinema
2007	Mama's Boy	Tim Hamilton	Warner Bros.
