= Mark Mothersbaugh =

American musician (born 1950)

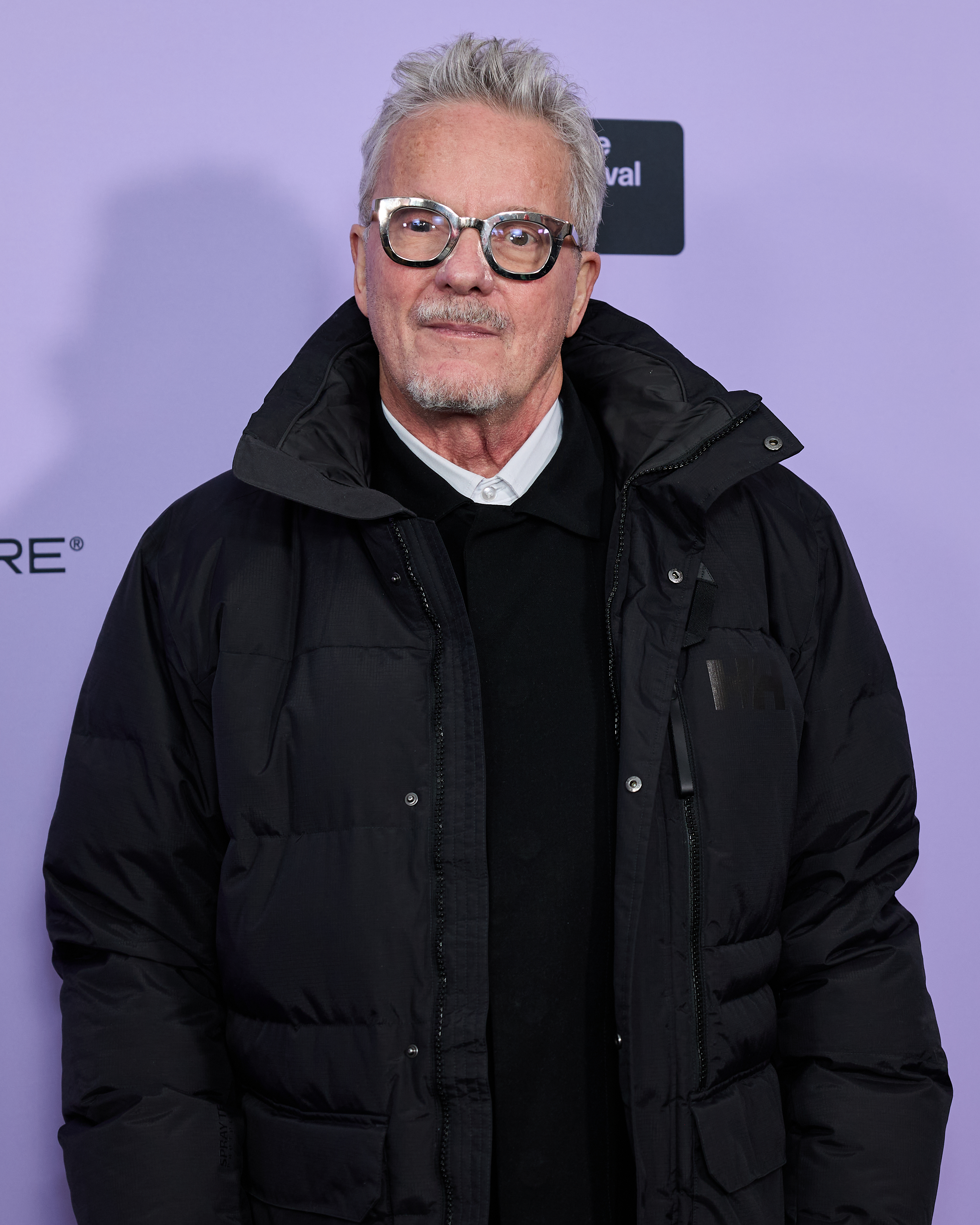
- Mothersbaugh at the premiere of the documentary film Devo at the 2024 Sundance Film Festival
- Born: Mark Allen Mothersbaugh; May 18, 1950 (age 76); Akron, Ohio, U.S.
- Occupations: Singer; songwriter; composer; multi-instrumentalist; record producer; visual artist
- Years active: 1972–present
- Spouses: Nancye Ferguson (divorced); Anita Greenspan
- Children: 2
- Relatives: Bob Mothersbaugh (brother); Jim Mothersbaugh (brother); Silas Hite (nephew)
- Musical career
- Genres: New wave; synth-pop; electronic rock; punk rock; post-punk; synth-punk; art punk; film score
- Instruments: Vocals; keyboards; synthesizer; guitar
- Labels: Tra Project; Rykodisc; Enigma
- Member of: Devo
- Formerly of: Dove, the Band of Love; Jihad Jerry & the Evildoers; the Wipeouters
- Website: markmothersbaugh.com

Mark Allen Mothersbaugh (/ˈmʌðərzbɔː/; born May 18, 1950) is an American musician and composer. He came to prominence in the late 1970s as co-founder, lead vocalist and keyboardist of the new wave band Devo, whose "Whip It" was a top 20 single in the US in 1980, peaking at No. 14, and which has since maintained a cult following. Mothersbaugh was one of the primary composers of Devo's music.

In addition to his work with Devo, Mothersbaugh has made music for television series, films and video games via his production company, Mutato Muzika. He composed the music for the 13-year run of the animated series Rugrats and its three related theatrical films. He has created film scores for Wes Anderson and for Marvel Comics films. As a solo musician, Mothersbaugh has released four studio albums: Muzik for Insomniaks, Muzik for the Gallery, Joyeux Mutato and The Most Powerful Healing Muzik in the Entire World.

In 2004, he received the Richard Kirk award at the BMI Film and TV Awards for his contributions to film and television music. In 2008, Mothersbaugh received an honorary doctorate of humane letters from Kent State University, his alma mater.

== Early years ==
Mark Allen Mothersbaugh was born on May 18, 1950, in Akron, Ohio. His parents are Mary Margaret ("Mig") and Robert Mothersbaugh Sr. He grew up with two younger brothers, Bob and Jim, who are both musicians, and two sisters, Amy and Susan, and graduated from Woodridge High School in Peninsula, Ohio. His father appeared in early Devo films and fan events as the character General Boy and his brothers participated in the band, although Jim's tenure was brief, appearing only on several early demos.

== Career ==
=== Devo ===
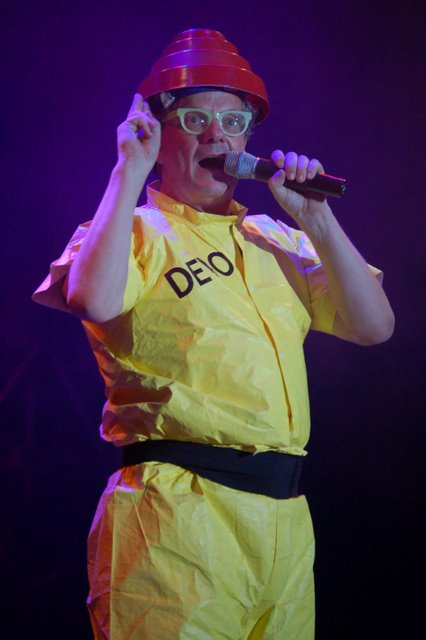
Mark Mothersbaugh performing live with Devo at the Festival Internacional de Benicàssim, 2007

Mothersbaugh attended Kent State University as an art student, where he met Devo co-founders Gerald Casale and Bob Lewis. In early 1970, Lewis and Casale formed the idea of the "devolution" of the human race after Casale's friends Jeffrey Miller and Allison Krause were killed by Ohio National Guardsmen on university grounds during what came to be known as the Kent State shootings. Intrigued by the concept, Mothersbaugh joined them, building upon it with elements of early post-structuralist ideas and oddball arcana, most notably unearthing the infamous Jocko-Homo Heavenbound pamphlet (the basis for the song "Jocko Homo"). This association culminated in 1973, when the trio started to play music as Devo.

Following the commercial failure of their sixth studio album Shout, Warner Bros. dropped Devo. Shortly after, claiming to feel creatively unfulfilled, drummer Alan Myers left the band, causing the remaining band members to abandon the plans for a Shout video LP, as well as a tour.

In 1987, Devo reformed with new drummer David Kendrick, formerly of Sparks, to replace Myers. Their first project was a soundtrack for the flop horror film Slaughterhouse Rock, starring Toni Basil and they released the studio albums Total Devo (1988) and Smooth Noodle Maps (1990), on Enigma.

Devo had a falling-out and played two shows in 1991 before breaking up. Around this time, members of Devo appeared in the film The Spirit of '76 (1990), except for Bob Mothersbaugh. In 1989, Mark Mothersbaugh established Mutato Muzika, a commercial music production studio, hiring Ryan Moore and Bob Casale; Bob Mothersbaugh was also involved.

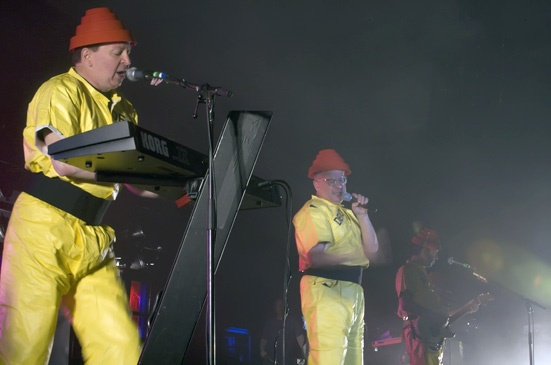
Devo performing live at Festival Hall, in Melbourne, Australia, 2008: Gerald Casale and Mothersbaugh

In 2006, Devo worked with Disney on the Devo 2.0 project: a band of child performers was assembled to re-record Devo songs. The Akron Beacon Journal wrote, "Devo recently finished a new project in cahoots with Disney called Devo 2.0, which features the band playing old songs and two new ones with vocals provided by children. Their debut studio album, a two disc CD/DVD combo entitled DEV2.0, was released on March 14, 2006. The lyrics of some of the songs were changed for family-friendly airplay, which has been claimed by the band to be a play on irony of the messages of their classic hits. Mothersbaugh doesn't rule out the idea of the band gathering in the studio, eventually, to record a new Devo album." The studio album, Something for Everybody was eventually released in June 2010, preceded by a 12" single of "Fresh"/"What We Do".

Devo was awarded the first Moog Innovator Award on October 29, 2010, during Moogfest 2010 in Asheville, North Carolina. The award aims to celebrate "pioneering artists whose genre-defying work exemplifies the bold, innovative spirit of Bob Moog". Devo was scheduled to perform at Moogfest, but canceled three days beforehand after Mark's brother Bob Mothersbaugh (lead guitar) injured his hand. He and Gerald Casale collaborated with Austin, Texas, band the Octopus Project to perform "Girl U Want" and "Beautiful World" at the event instead.

=== Other work ===
In 1989, Mothersbaugh and other members of Devo were involved in the project Visiting Kids, releasing a self-titled extended play (EP) on the New Rose label in 1990. The group featured his then-wife Nancye Ferguson, as well as David Kendrick, Bob Mothersbaugh, and Bob's daughter Alex Mothersbaugh. Mothersbaugh co-wrote some of the songs, and produced the album with Bob Casale. A promotional video was filmed for the song "Trilobites". Visiting Kids appeared on the soundtrack to the film Rockula, as well as on the Late Show with David Letterman.

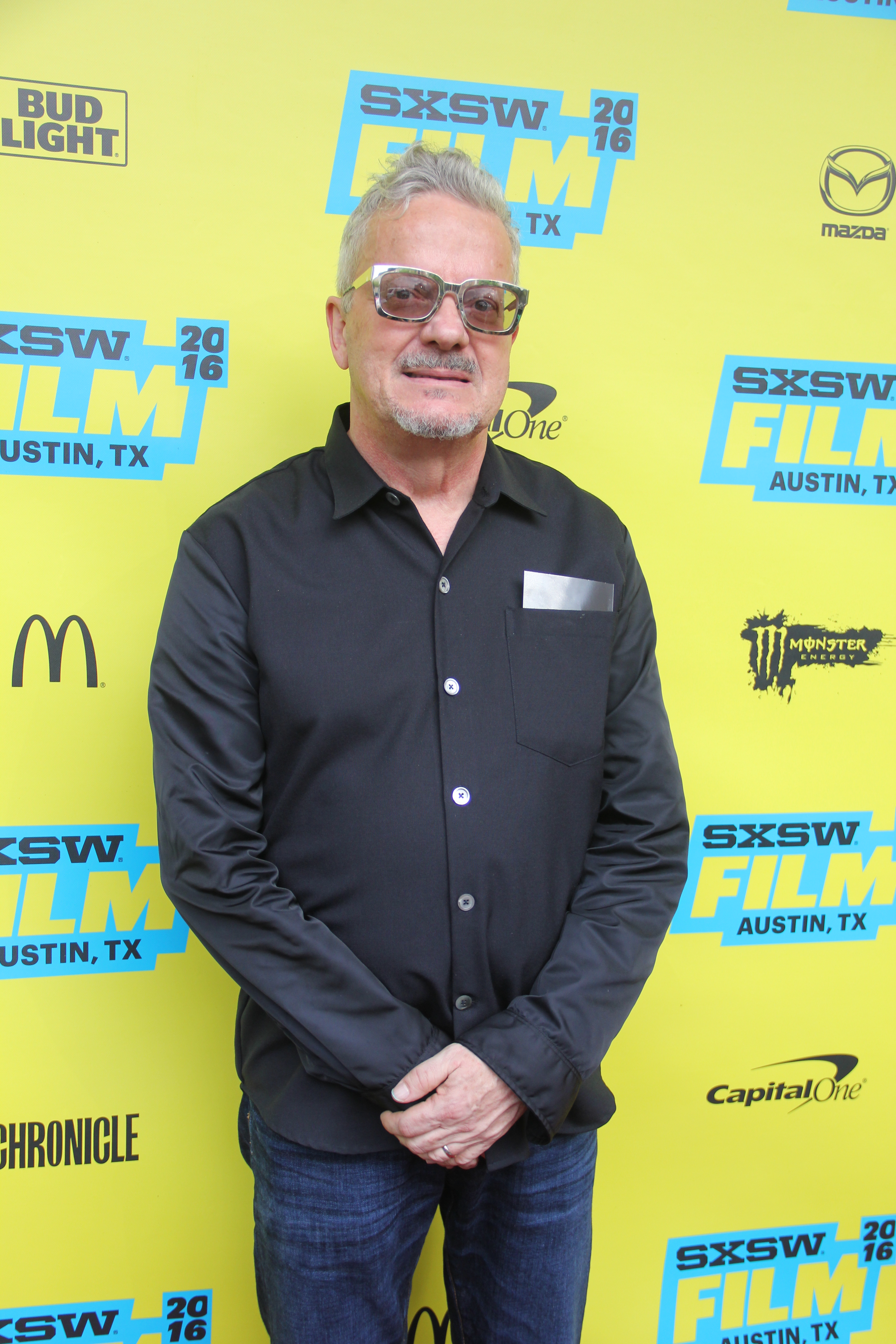
Mothersbaugh at the premiere of Pee-wee's Big Holiday during SXSW 2016

Since Devo, Mothersbaugh has developed a successful career writing musical scores for film and television. In film, he has worked frequently with filmmaker Wes Anderson, scoring four of his feature films: Bottle Rocket (1996), Rushmore (1998), The Royal Tenenbaums (2001), and The Life Aquatic with Steve Zissou (2004). He composed for The Lego Movie (2014) and Thor: Ragnarok (2017).

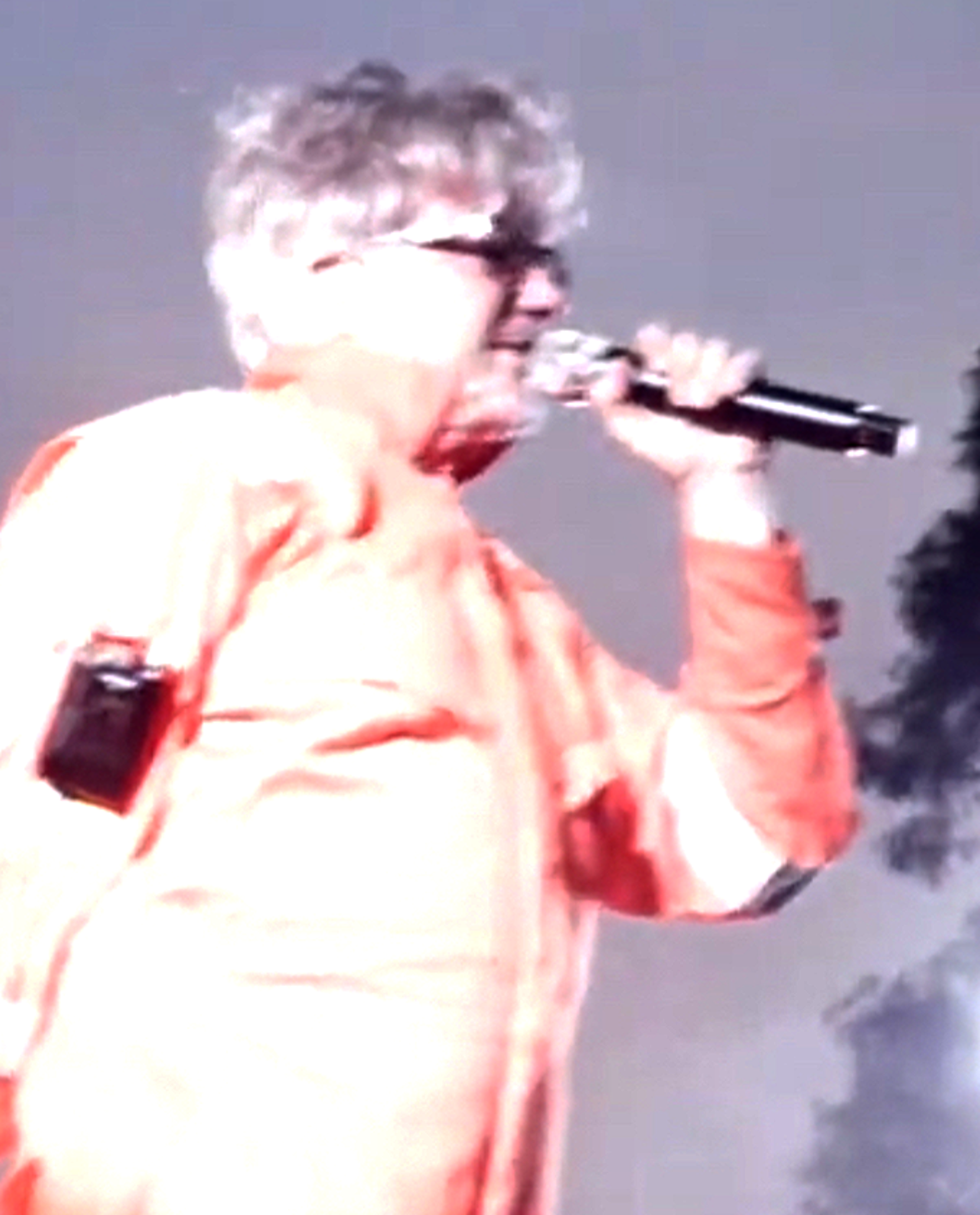
Mothersbaugh performing live with Devo in 2018.

His music has been a staple of the children's television shows Rugrats, Beakman's World, Santo Bugito and Clifford the Big Red Dog. He wrote the new theme song for the original Felix the Cat show when it was sold to Broadway Video, some music for Pee-wee's Playhouse in 1986–1990 and the theme song for the Super Mario World TV series for DIC Entertainment in 1991. The character design for Chuckie on Rugrats was loosely based on him. Along with Bob Casale, he produced Heroes & Villains (2000), a soundtrack album with music inspired by The Powerpuff Girls. Mothersbaugh originally sought out to be the show's main composer, but his demo was rejected by creator Craig McCracken, who despite being a Devo fan, had concerns about his cartoon being pushed aside if a big feature film came to Mothersbaugh's production company.

Mothersbaugh produces music for video games, including Sony's Crash Bandicoot and Jak and Daxter series (both music scores were created by Josh Mancell), and for EA Games' The Sims 2 (2004). This work is often performed with Mutato Muzika, the music production company he formed with Devo members Bob Mothersbaugh and Bob Casale. Mothersbaugh composed the original score for Ratchet & Clank: Rift Apart (2021).

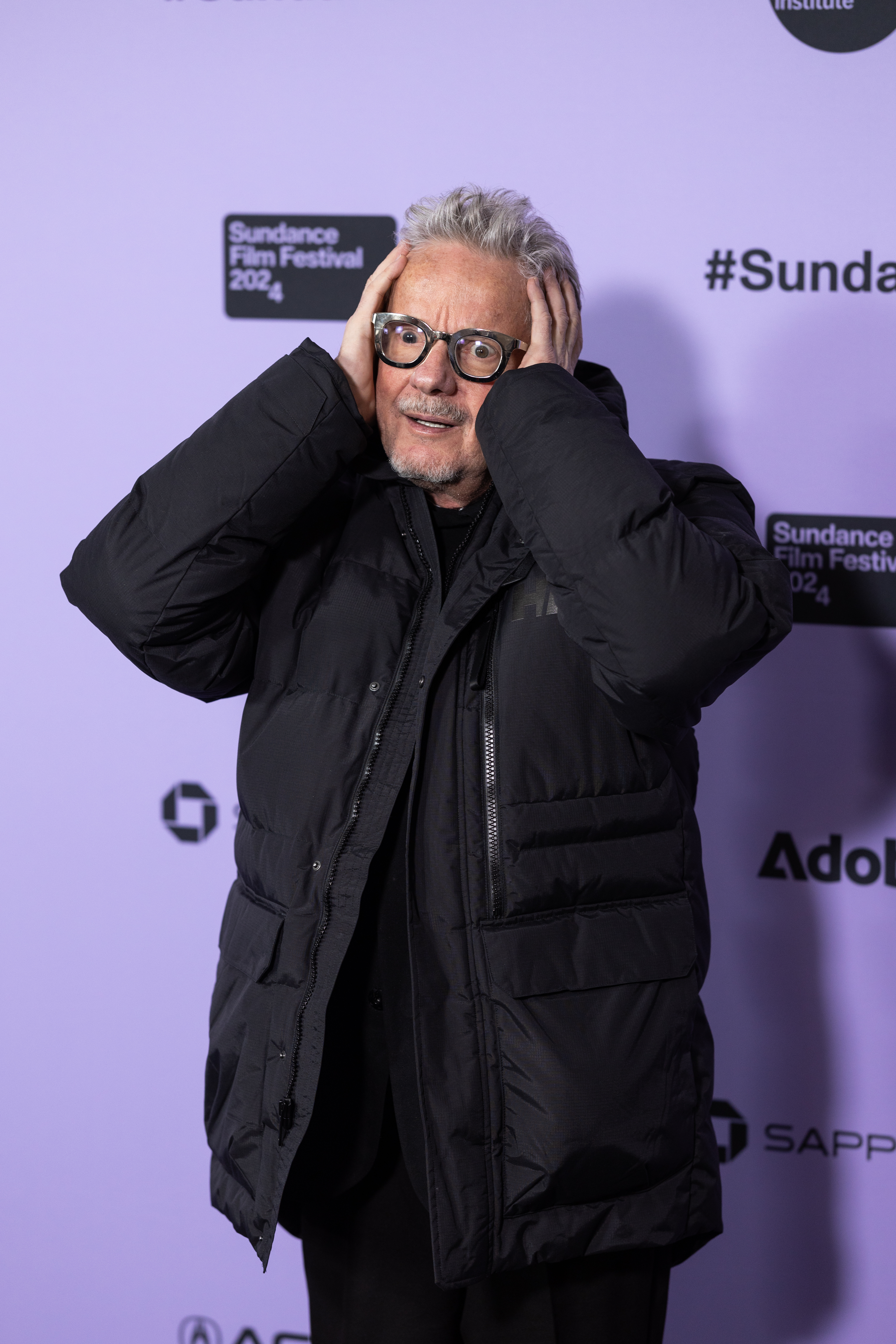
Mothersbaugh at the 2024 Sundance Film Festival, at the premiere of the film Devo.

Mothersbaugh composed:

- "Having Trouble Sneezing", the distinctive music in the award-winning "Get a Mac" commercials for Apple Inc.
- The score for the first season of the television series Big Love, though he was replaced after one season by David Byrne of Talking Heads.
- The theme music for the American television show Eureka, broadcast on the Syfy channel.
- The score of the Cartoon Network's TV series Regular Show.
- The score for HBO's Close Enough alongside John Enroth and Albert Fox.
- The score for HBO's Our Flag Means Death.

In 2013, Mothersbaugh appeared on an episode of The Aquabats! Super Show!, an action-comedy series by the creators of Yo Gabba Gabba! starring the Devo-influenced band the Aquabats, playing the eccentric scientist father of one of the main characters, Jimmy the Robot.

Mothersbaugh and Casale have produced music for other artists, including Toni Basil.

=== Visual art and exhibitions ===
Mothersbaugh has also been successful as a visual artist. In November 2014, Mothersbaugh said, "I've done over 150 art gallery shows in the last 20 years."

In the 1980s and 1990s, Mothersbaugh contributed to the art magazine Exit, operated by George Petros and Adam Parfrey.

On February 6, 2014, the Museum of Contemporary Art Denver (MCA Denver) announced a retrospective exhibition to bring together the first comprehensive presentation of Mothersbaugh's art and music. This nationally touring exhibition was accompanied by a publication, Mark Mothersbaugh: Myopia, published by Princeton Architectural Press. 50 selections of postcard art from Myopia were published as a postcard book titled Mark Mothersbaugh: Collected Facts & Lies in 2015. The Grey Art Museum later exhibited Mark Mothersbaugh: Myopia from April 26–July 15, 2017.

As a prelude to the Myopia exhibit opening in Cincinnati, Ohio, Mothersbaugh held a concert gathering which included Devo songs and movie scores played in a classical style, an address to the audience with anecdotes, and musical pieces he specifically composed for a six-keyboard hybrid originally used for teaching lessons, that was refurbished by his brother Bob and contained a counter in the center for keeping time. The instrument was played by six people simultaneously.

Mothersbaugh hosted a drawing segment on the Nick Jr. Channel television series Yo Gabba Gabba! called Mark's Magic Pictures, teaching children how to draw simple pictures. The pictures often come alive at the end of the segment through animation.

== Personal life ==
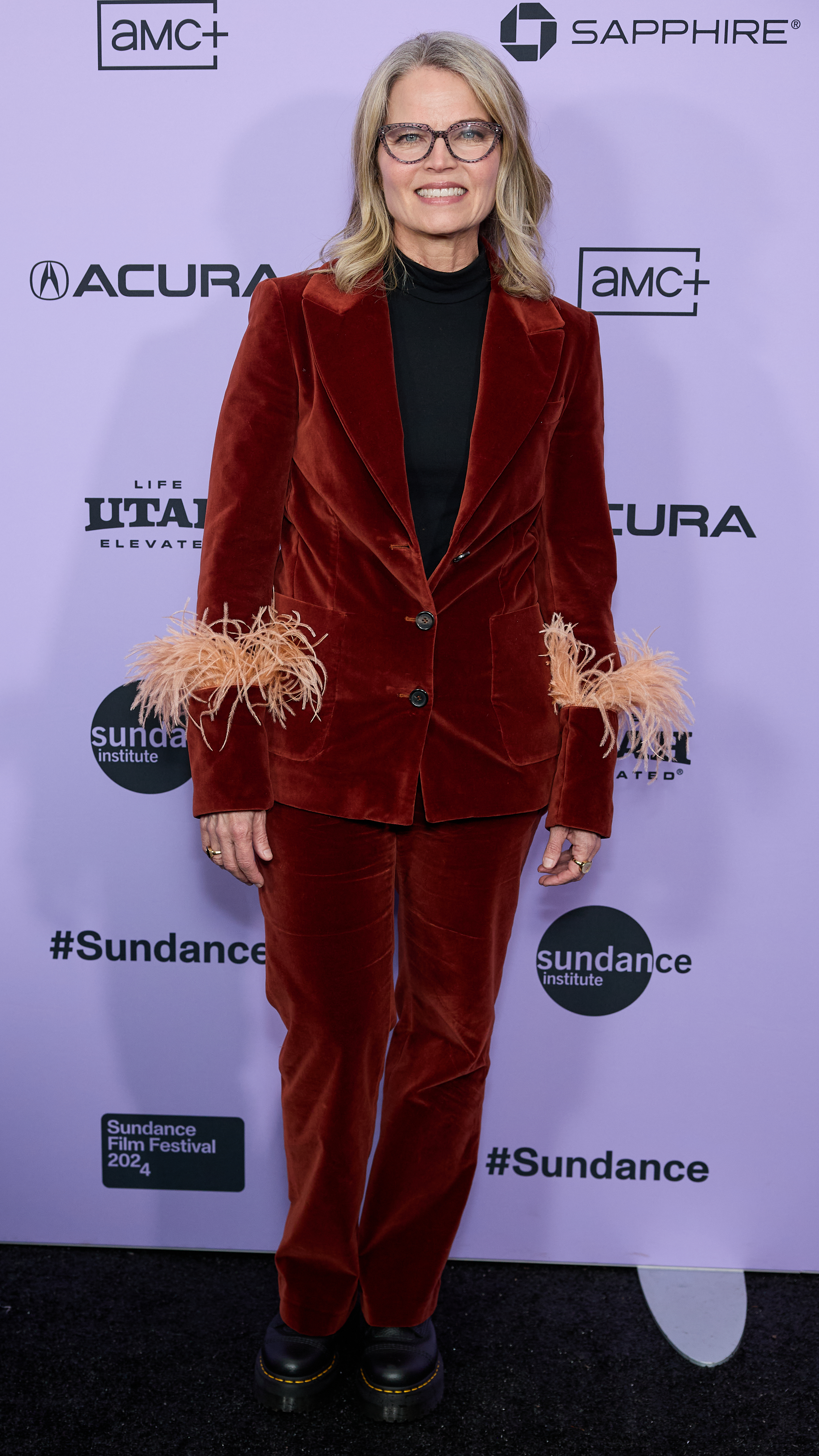
Anita Greenspan at the 2024 Sundance Film Festival

At the age of seven, Mothersbaugh began wearing glasses to correct his severe myopia and astigmatism. Over the years, he took an interest in designing his own distinctive eyewear for use in Devo shows. He favored a set of stainless steel frames for regular use made by a Los Angeles shop called LA Eyeworks and says he purchased as many pairs as he could find because they tended to break or get stolen by fans. In a joint venture with eyewear manufacturer Shane Baum, Mothersbaugh has designed his own branded frames for sale, made of beryllium with a stainless steel chrome finish, in three different styles as of 2015. The Baumvision press release states that the unisex model "Francesca" is named for one of Mothersbaugh's pug dogs which is a simultaneous hermaphrodite that is also called Frank.

In a 2016 interview, Mothersbaugh mentioned having attention deficit disorder (ADD).

He has been married twice. His first wife was actress Nancye Ferguson, who can be seen briefly performing with him in the 1999 superhero comedy film Mystery Men. His current wife is Anita Greenspan, who runs the film music managing company Greenspan Kohan Management with Neil Kohan. The couple has two daughters from China, adopted after Greenspan learned of the practice in that country of female children being abandoned because of their gender.

Mothersbaugh is a collector and connoisseur of song poems and unusual or vintage musical devices. He is the owner of Raymond Scott's Electronium (although it is currently not functional).

Mothersbaugh contracted COVID-19 in May 2020, and was placed on a ventilator in an intensive care unit at Cedars-Sinai Medical Center for 18 days. In August 2020, Mothersbaugh recounted that he "nearly died" of the disease, and was in a delusional state while infected; he came to believe that he had been hospitalized after being hit by a brick in Little Tokyo, and repeatedly urged his family members to search for his attackers. He described having lasting neuropathic pain as a result of the illness. He also lost most of his vision in his right eye during the first few days in the ICU while intubated. The condition was determined not to have been caused by COVID and cannot be repaired. He says the eye's vision is now permanently blurred like what he saw as a child, and calls himself a "cyclops".

Mothersbaugh was once a member of the parody religion the Church of the SubGenius.

== Honors and awards ==
Mothersbaugh was honored with the Richard Kirk Award at the 2004 BMI Film and TV Awards. The award is given annually to a composer of film and television music.

On May 10, 2008, Mothersbaugh was awarded an honorary doctorate of humane letters from Kent State University.

On May 28, 2016, Mothersbaugh was awarded the key to the city of Akron during a ceremony at the Akron-Summit County Public Library.

== Filmography ==
- Human Highway (1982)
- NBC station identifications (1990)
- Felix the Cat (1990) (TV, digitally remastered footage version of the original series) (theme)
- Super Mario World (1991) (TV) (theme)
- Liquid Television (1991) (TV)
- Davis Rules (1991) (TV)
- Sewer Shark (1992) (VG)
- Great Scott! (1992) (TV)
- Mann & Machine (1992) (TV)
- Beakman's World (1992) (TV) (theme)
- Brain Donors (1992) (opening and end credits)
- Bakersfield P.D. (1993) (TV)
- South Beach (1993) (TV)
- Street Match (1993) (TV)
- Down on the Waterfront (1993)
- Hotel Malibu (1994) TV Series
- Edith Ann: A Few Pieces of the Puzzle (1994) (TV)
- Santo Bugito (1995) (TV) (as Mark "Mothersbug")
- Too Something (1995) (TV)
- If Not for You (1995) (TV)
- Strange Luck (1995) (TV)
- Sliders (1995) (TV)
- The Courtyard (1995) (TV)
- The Last Supper (1995) (musical score)
- Flesh Suitcase (1995)
- Frosty Returns (1995) (TV)
- The Big Squeeze (1996)
- Class Reunion (1996) (TV)
- Quicksilver Highway (1997) (TV)
- Fired Up (1997) (TV)
- Men (1997)
- Unwed Father (1997) (TV)
- Working (1997) (TV) (theme)
- Last Rites (1998) (TV)
- The Mr. Potato Head Show (1998) (TV)
- The Simple Life (TV)
- Stories from My Childhood (1998) (TV)
- Interstate '82 (1999) (VG)
- Rocket Power (1999) (TV) (theme music)
- The Wacky Adventures of Ronald McDonald: The Visitors from Outer Space (1999) (V)
- Sammy (2000) (TV)
- Tucker (2000) (TV)
- The Other Me (2000) (TV)
- All Growed Up (2001) (TV)
- Rugrats: Still Babies After All These Years (2001) (TV)
- Second String (2002) (TV)
- Cheats (2002)
- MDs (2002) (TV)
- Hidden Hills (2002) (TV)
- The Groovenians (2002) (TV)
- A Guy Thing (2003)
- The Life Aquatic with Steve Zissou (2004)
- The Big House (2004) (TV)
- Popeye's Voyage: The Quest for Pappy (2004) (V)
- The Sims 2 (and Expansion Packs) (2004–2008) (VG)
- The Complete Truth About De-Evolution (2004) (V)
- Music for Edward Gorey (2005)
- Get a Mac (2006–2009)
- Feed Me (2006)
- Eureka (2006) (TV) (Theme)
- Boom Blox (2008) (VG)
- Cars Toons (2008–2014)
- Boom Blox Bash Party (2009) (VG)
- Skate 3 (2010) (VG)
- Catfish (2010)
- Hawaiian Vacation (2011)
- Shameless (2011) (TV)
- Thor: Ragnarok (2017)
- Hotel Transylvania 3: Summer Vacation (2018)
- The Croods: A New Age (2020)
- The Mitchells vs. the Machines (2021)
- Hotel Transylvania: Transformania (2022)
- How We Roll (2022)
- Cocaine Bear (2023)
- A Minecraft Movie (2025)
- Hoppers (2026)

=== Television ===
Years	Title	Notes
1986–1990	Pee-wee's Playhouse	
1991–2006	Rugrats	with Denis M. Hannigan, Rusty Andrews and Bob Mothersbaugh; First score for an animated series
1992–1995	Adventures in Wonderland	with Denis M. Hannigan, Rusty Andrews and Josh Mancell
1995–1996	Dumb and Dumber	
1998–1999	The Mr. Potato Head Show	with Ernie Mannix
1999	Rocket Power	Theme song
1999–2000	Dawson's Creek	Season 3
2000–2003	Clifford the Big Red Dog	with Josh Mancell
2000–2001	Grosse Pointe	
2003–2008	All Grown Up!	with Bob Mothersbaugh
2004–2005	LAX	
2006	Big Love	
2007–2015	Yo Gabba Gabba!	
2010–2011	Blue Mountain State	
2010–2011	Glory Daze	
2010–2017	Regular Show	with John Enroth and Albert Fox; Except theme song
2011–2013	Enlightened	
2012–2016	House of Lies	
2013–2014	The Carrie Diaries	
2013	The Aquabats! Super Show!	with J.J. Neward
2015	Exchange Student Zero	with Bob Mothersbaugh
2015–2018	The Last Man on Earth	
2015–2018	Grandfathered	
2016	Bordertown	
2016–2017	People of Earth	
2016	Ice Age: The Great Egg-Scapade	Ice Age TV special
2017	Abstract: The Art of Design	
2018–2023	Summer Camp Island	with John Enroth and Albert Fox; also theme music with Seo Kim
2018–2023	Disenchantment	
2018–2019	Dirty John	
2019–2020	What We Do in the Shadows	
2020	Tiger King: Murder, Mayhem and Madness	with John Enroth, Albert Fox, and Bob Mothersbaugh
2020–2022	Close Enough	with John Enroth and Albert Fox
2021	Rugrats	Theme song only
2022–2023	Our Flag Means Death	
2023	Hello Tomorrow!	
2024–2025	A Real Bug's Life	
2024	Time Bandits	
2024	Interior Chinatown	with Nick Lee
2025	The Residence	

=== Film ===
==== 1980s ====
Year	Title	Director(s)	Studio(s)	Notes
1987	Revenge of the Nerds II: Nerds in Paradise	Joe Roth	20th Century Fox; Interscope Communications; Amercent Films; American Entertainment Partners L.P.	—N/a
1988	Slaughterhouse Rock	Dimitri Logothetis	Taurus Entertainment Company; Arista Films; First American Film Capital	—N/a

==== 1990s ====
Year	Title	Director(s)	Studio(s)	Notes
1992	Frosty Returns	Evert Brown; Bill Melendez	CBS Productions; Broadway Video; Bill Melendez Productions	Animated television special
1994	It's Pat	Adam Bernstein	Touchstone Pictures	—N/a
1994	The New Age	Michael Tolkin	Warner Bros. Regency Enterprises; Alcor Films; Ixtlan	—N/a
1995	Four Rooms	Allison Anders; Alexander Rockwell; Robert Rodriguez; Quentin Tarantino	A Band Apart; Miramax Films	Music producer
1995	The Last Supper	Stacy Title	Columbia Pictures	—N/a
1996	Happy Gilmore	Dennis Dugan	Universal Pictures; Brillstein-Grey Entertainment; Robert Simonds Productions	—N/a
1996	Bottle Rocket	Wes Anderson	Columbia Pictures; Gracie Films	—N/a
1997	Best Men	Tamra Davis	Orion Pictures	—N/a
1997	Breaking Up	Robert Greenwald	Warner Bros. Regency Enterprises	—N/a
1998	Principal Takes a Holiday	Robert King	Walt Disney Television; ABC; Storyline Entertainment	Television film
1998	Bongwater	Richard Sears	First Look Studios; Alliance Independent Films	with Josh Mancell
1998	Dead Man on Campus	Alan Cohn	Paramount Pictures; MTV Productions; Pacific Western	—N/a
1998	Rushmore	Wes Anderson	Touchstone Pictures; American Empirical Pictures	—N/a
1998	Halloweentown	Duwayne Dunham	Disney Channel; Singer-White Entertainment	Television film
1998	The Rugrats Movie	Norton Virgien; Igor Kovalyov	Paramount Pictures; Nickelodeon Movies; Klasky Csupo	First score for an animated film
1999	200 Cigarettes	Risa Bramon Garcia	Paramount Pictures; MTV Productions; Lakeshore Entertainment	with Bob Mothersbaugh
1999	Can of Worms	Paul Schneider	Disney Channel; Gross-Weston Productions	Television film
1999	It's the Rage	James D. Stern	Silver Nitrate Pictures; Screenland Pictures	—N/a
1999	Drop Dead Gorgeous	Michael Patrick Jann	New Line Cinema	—N/a

==== 2000s ====
Year	Title	Director(s)	Studio(s)	Notes
2000	The Adventures of Rocky and Bullwinkle	Des McAnuff	Universal Pictures; TriBeCa Productions; Jay Ward Productions; Capella International; KC Medien	—N/a
2000	Rugrats in Paris: The Movie	Stig Bergqvist; Paul Demeyer	Paramount Pictures; Nickelodeon Movies; Klasky Csupo	—N/a
2001	Glass, Necktie	Paul Bojack	E.I. Independent Cinema; Lost Battalion Films	—N/a
2001	Camouflage	James Keach	Sunland Studios; Camouflage Productions Inc. Interlight	Direct-to-video film
2001	Sugar & Spice	Francine McDougall	New Line Cinema	—N/a
2001	Halloweentown II: Kalabar's Revenge	Mary Lambert	Disney Channel	Television film
2001	The Royal Tenenbaums	Wes Anderson	Touchstone Pictures; American Empirical Pictures	—N/a
2002	Sorority Boys	Wallace Wolodarsky	Touchstone Pictures	—N/a
2002	Welcome to Collinwood	Anthony and Joe Russo	Warner Bros. Gaylord Films; H5B5 Media AG; Pandora Cinema; Section Eight	—N/a
2003	A Guy Thing	Chris Koch	Metro-Goldwyn-Mayer; David Ladd Films	—N/a
2003	Thirteen	Catherine Hardwicke	Fox Searchlight Pictures	—N/a
2003	The Even Stevens Movie	Sean McNamara	Disney Channel	Television film
2003	Rugrats Go Wild	Norton Virgien; John Eng	Paramount Pictures; Nickelodeon Movies; Klasky Csupo	—N/a
2003	Good Boy!	John Robert Hoffman	Metro-Goldwyn-Mayer	—N/a
2004	Confessions of a Teenage Drama Queen	Sara Sugarman	Walt Disney Pictures	—N/a
2004	Envy	Barry Levinson	DreamWorks Pictures; Columbia Pictures; Castle Rock Entertainment; Baltimore/Spring Creek Pictures	—N/a
2004	The Life Aquatic with Steve Zissou	Wes Anderson	Touchstone Pictures; American Empirical Pictures	—N/a
2005	Lords of Dogtown	Catherine Hardwicke	Columbia Pictures; TriStar Pictures; Art Linson Productions; Indelible Pictures; Senator International	—N/a
2005	Herbie: Fully Loaded	Angela Robinson	Walt Disney Pictures; Robert Simonds Productions	—N/a
2005	The Big White	Mark Mylod	Ascendant Pictures; Capitol Films; VIP Medienfonds 2 Ascendant	—N/a
2005	The Ringer	Barry W. Blaustein	Fox Searchlight Pictures; Conundrum Entertainment	—N/a
2006	How to Eat Fried Worms	Bob Dolman	New Line Cinema; Walden Media	with Bob Mothersbaugh
2006	The Dog Problem	Scott Caan	Thousand Words	—N/a
2007	Mama's Boy	Tim Hamilton	Warner Bros.	—N/a
2008	Quid Pro Quo	Carlos Brooks	Magnolia Pictures; HDNet Films; Sanford/Pillsbury Productions; 2929 Productions	—N/a
2008	Nick & Norah's Infinite Playlist	Peter Sollett	Columbia Pictures; Mandate Pictures; Depth of Field	—N/a
2009	Fanboys	Kyle Newman	The Weinstein Company; Trigger Street Productions	—N/a
2009	Cloudy with a Chance of Meatballs	Phil Lord; Chris Miller	Columbia Pictures; Sony Pictures Animation	—N/a
2009	Falling Up	David M. Rosenthal	Anchor Bay Entertainment	—N/a
2009	Circle of Eight	Stephen Cragg	Paramount Home Entertainment	Direct-to-video film

==== 2010s ====
Year	Title	Director(s)	Studio(s)	Notes
2010	Ramona and Beezus	Elizabeth Allen	20th Century Fox; Fox 2000 Pictures; Di Novi Pictures; Impact Productions; Walden Media; Dune Entertainment; Eyeline Entertainment	—N/a
2011	Saving Private Perez	Beto Gómez	Lionsgate; Videocine; Pantelion Films; Salamandra Films; Lemon Films; Terregal Films; Via Media	Mexican film
2011	Born to Be Wild	David Lickley	Warner Bros. Pictures; IMAX Pictures; Walker World Pictures	IMAX documentary
2011	Alvin and the Chipmunks: Chipwrecked	Mike Mitchell	20th Century Fox; Fox 2000 Pictures; Regency Enterprises; Bagdasarian Company; Dune Entertainment	—N/a
2012	21 Jump Street	Phil Lord; Chris Miller	Columbia Pictures; Metro-Goldwyn-Mayer; Relativity Media; Original Film; Cannell Studios	—N/a
2012	Safe	Boaz Yakin	Lionsgate; IM Global; Lawrence Bender Productions; Trigger Street Productions; Automatik; 87Eleven Productions	—N/a
2012	What to Expect When You're Expecting	Kirk Jones	Lionsgate; Alcon Entertainment; Phoenix Pictures; What to Expect Productions; Georgia Public	—N/a
2012	Hotel Transylvania	Genndy Tartakovsky	Columbia Pictures; Sony Pictures Animation	—N/a
2013	Cloudy with a Chance of Meatballs 2	Cody Cameron; Kris Pearn	Columbia Pictures; Sony Pictures Animation	—N/a
2013	Last Vegas	Jon Turteltaub	CBS Films; Good Universe	—N/a
2014	The Lego Movie	Phil Lord; Chris Miller	Warner Bros. Pictures; Warner Animation Group; Village Roadshow Pictures; RatPac-Dune Entertainment; Lego System A/S; Vertigo Entertainment; Lin Pictures	—N/a
2014	22 Jump Street	Phil Lord; Chris Miller	Columbia Pictures; Metro-Goldwyn-Mayer; LStar Capital; MRC; Original Film; Cannell Studios; Storyville; 75 Year Plan Productions	—N/a
2014	Island of Lemurs: Madagascar	David Douglas	Warner Bros. Pictures; IMAX Corporation	IMAX film
2015	Pitch Perfect 2	Elizabeth Banks	Universal Pictures; Gold Circle Films; Brownstone Productions	—N/a
2015	Vacation	Jonathan Goldstein; John Francis Daley	Warner Bros. Pictures; New Line Cinema; RatPac-Dune Entertainment; BenderSpink; Big Kid Pictures	—N/a
2015	Regular Show: The Movie	J. G. Quintel	Cartoon Network Studios	Television movie
2015	Hotel Transylvania 2	Genndy Tartakovsky	Columbia Pictures; Sony Pictures Animation; LStar Capital	—N/a
2015	Forever	Tatia Pilieva	Monterey Media; Elysium Bandini Studios; Foreverland Productions	—N/a
2015	Alvin and the Chipmunks: The Road Chip	Walt Becker	20th Century Fox; Fox 2000 Pictures; Regency Enterprises; Bagdasarian Productions	—N/a
2015	Scrat's Cosmic Scrat-tasrophe	Mike Thurmeier	20th Century Fox; 20th Century Fox Animation; Blue Sky Studios	Ice Age short film
2016	Pee-wee's Big Holiday	John Lee	Netflix; Pee-wee Pictures; Apatow Productions	Netflix original movie
2017	Beatriz at Dinner	Miguel Arteta	Roadside Attractions; FilmNation Entertainment; Elevation Pictures; Killer Films; Bron Studios	—N/a
2017	Brad's Status	Mike White	Amazon Studios; Annapurna Pictures; Sidney Kimmel Entertainment; Plan B Entertainment	—N/a
2017	Puppy!	Genndy Tartakovsky	Columbia Pictures; Sony Pictures Animation	Hotel Transylvania short film
2017	Me gusta, pero me asusta	Beto Gómez	Diamond Films; Grupo Telefilms; Wetzer Films	Mexican film
2017	The Lego Ninjago Movie	Charlie Bean; Paul Fisher; Bob Logan	Warner Bros. Pictures; Warner Animation Group; RatPac-Dune Entertainment; Lego System A/S; Lin Pictures; Lord Miller Productions; Vertigo Entertainment	—N/a
2017	Thor: Ragnarok	Taika Waititi	Walt Disney Studios Motion Pictures; Marvel Studios	—N/a
2018	Pandas	David Douglas; Drew Fellman	Warner Bros. Pictures; IMAX Pictures	IMAX documentary
2018	Hotel Transylvania 3: Summer Vacation	Genndy Tartakovsky	Columbia Pictures; Sony Pictures Animation	—N/a
2018	Holmes & Watson	Etan Cohen	Columbia Pictures; Mosaic Media Group; Gary Sanchez Productions; Mimran Schur Pictures	—N/a
2019	The Lego Movie 2: The Second Part	Mike Mitchell	Warner Bros. Pictures; Warner Animation Group; Lego System A/S; Rideback; Lord Miller Productions; Vertigo Entertainment	—N/a

==== 2020s ====
Year	Title	Director(s)	Studio(s)	Notes
2020	The Willoughbys	Kris Pearn; Rob Lodermeier	Netflix; Netflix Animation; Bron Studios; Creative Wealth Media	—N/a
2020	The Croods: A New Age	Joel Crawford	Universal Pictures; DreamWorks Animation	Replaced Alan Silvestri
2021	Monster Pets	Jennifer Kluska; Derek Drymon	Columbia Pictures; Sony Pictures Animation	Hotel Transylvania short film
2021	The Mitchells vs. the Machines	Mike Rianda; Jeff Rowe	Columbia Pictures; Sony Pictures Animation; Lord Miller Productions; One Cool Films; Netflix	—N/a
2021	America: The Motion Picture	Matt Thompson	Netflix; Netflix Animation; Lord Miller Productions; Floyd County Productions; Free Association	—N/a
2022	Hotel Transylvania: Transformania	Jennifer Kluska; Derek Drymon	Amazon Studios; Columbia Pictures; Sony Pictures Animation	—N/a
2023	Cocaine Bear	Elizabeth Banks	Brownstone Productions; Lord Miller Productions; Universal Pictures	Replaced Natalie Holt
2023	The Magician's Elephant	Wendy Rogers	Netflix; Netflix Animation; Pistor Productions	Netflix original movie
2023	Vacation Friends 2	Clay Tarver	Hulu; 20th Century Studios; Broken Road Productions	Hulu original movie
2024	The World According to Allee Willis	Alexis Manya Spraic	Blackburn Pictures	—N/a
2025	A Minecraft Movie	Jared Hess	Warner Bros. Pictures; Legendary Pictures; Mojang Studios; Vertigo Entertainment; On the Roam	—N/a
2026	Hoppers	Daniel Chong	Walt Disney Studios Motion Pictures; Pixar Animation Studios	Also score producer.

=== Video games ===
Year	Title	Role
1996	Crash Bandicoot	Music producer
1997	Crash Bandicoot 2: Cortex Strikes Back	Music producer
1998	Crash Bandicoot: Warped	Music producer
1998	Rugrats: Search for Reptar	Composer
1999	Crash Team Racing	Music producer
1999	Interstate '82	Music producer
1999	Rugrats: Studio Tour	Composer
2001	Jak and Daxter: The Precursor Legacy	Music producer
2003	Jak II	Music producer
2004	Jak 3	Music producer
2004	The Sims 2	Composer
2007	MySims	Additional music
2007	The Simpsons Game	Additional music
2008	Boom Blox	Composer
2008	MySims Kingdom	Additional music
2009	MySims Racing	Additional music
2009	MySims Agents	Additional music
2010	Skate 3	Composer
2014	The Lego Movie Videogame	Composer
2021	Ratchet & Clank: Rift Apart	Composer

== Bibliography ==
- My Struggle (as Booji Boy)
- What I Know Volume I
- Beautiful Mutants
- Apotropaic Beatnik Graffiti

== Discography ==
=== Solo ===
Studio albums

- Muzik for Insomniaks (Cassette, 1985)
  - Later released on CD as Muzik for Insomniaks, Vol. 1 and Muzik for Insomniaks, Vol. 2 in 1988 by Rykodisc
- Muzik for the Gallery (LP, 1987)
- Joyeux Mutato (CD, 1999, Rhino Handmade limited edition; reissued 2000 by Rhino to regular retail)
- The Most Powerful Healing Muzik in the Entire World (6-CD Set, 2005)
- Mutant Flora (6 × Vinyl, 7" Box Set, 2017)
