= Master and Commander: The Far Side of the World (soundtrack) =

2003 film soundtrack album

Master and Commander: The Far Side of the World (Music from the Motion Picture)

Soundtrack album by Iva Davies, Christopher Gordon and Richard Tognetti
- Released: 11 November 2003
- Recorded: 2003
- Studio: Newman Scoring Stage, 20th Century Fox Studios, Los Angeles; Capitol Studios, Hollywood
- Genre: Film score; classical
- Length: 59:45
- Label: Decca; Fox Music
- Producer: Iva Davies; Christopher Gordon; Richard Tognetti

Iva Davies chronology
The Ghost of Time (1999)	Master and Commander: The Far Side of the World (2003)	The Incredible Journey of Mary Bryant (2005)

Christopher Gordon chronology
On the Beach (2000)	Master and Commander: The Far Side of the World (2003)	Salem's Lot (2004)

Richard Tognetti chronology
Master and Commander: The Far Side of the World (2003)	Storm Surfers 3D (2010)

Master and Commander: The Far Side of the World (Music from the Motion Picture) is the soundtrack album to the 2003 film Master and Commander: The Far Side of the World directed by Peter Weir starring Russell Crowe and Paul Bettany. The album featured an original score composed by Iva Davies, Christopher Gordon and Richard Tognetti along with classical compositions and released through Decca Records on 11 November 2003.

== Background ==
Iva Davies, lead singer of the Australian band Icehouse, traveled to Los Angeles to record the soundtrack to the film with Christopher Gordon and Richard Tognetti. Together, they won the 2004 APRA/AGSC Screen Music Award in the "Best Soundtrack Album" category.

The project began resultant of Weir having seen Davies' performance of a reworking of his Icehouse song "Great Southern Land" (under the title "The Ghost of Time") at the Sydney Opera House during the 2000 Millennium Eve celebrations. Weir contacted Davies asking him to create a score for the film "based on that style". Tognetti and Gordon had also been involved in that performance and recording. Davies had earlier composed the soundtrack for the 1984 Russell Mulcahy directed film Razorback.

The score includes an assortment of baroque and classical music, notably the first of Johann Sebastian Bach's Suites for Unaccompanied Cello, Suite No. 1 in G major, BWV 1007, played by Yo-Yo Ma; the Strassburg theme in the third movement of Wolfgang Amadeus Mozart's Violin Concerto No. 3; the third (Adagio) movement of Corelli's Christmas Concerto (Concerto grosso in G minor, Op. 6, No. 8); and a recurring rendition of Ralph Vaughan Williams's Fantasia on a Theme of Thomas Tallis. The music played on violin and cello before the end is Luigi Boccherini's String Quintet (Quintettino) for 2 violins, viola & 2 cellos in C major ("Musica notturna delle strade di Madrid"), G. 324 Op. 30. The two arrangements of this cue contained in the CD differ significantly from the one heard in the movie.

The song sung in the wardroom is "Don't Forget Your Old Shipmates", a British Navy song written in the early 1800s and arranged in 1978 by Jim Mageean from his album Of Ships... and Men. The tunes sung and played by the crew on deck at night are "O'Sullivan's March", "Spanish Ladies" and "The British Tars" ("The shipwrecked tar"), which was set to tune of "Bonnie Ship the Diamond" and called "Raging Sea/Bonnie Ship the Diamond" on the soundtrack.

== Reception ==
Peter Simons of Movie Music UK wrote "While the album as whole may be flawed, the score tracks by themselves – the ones that do not make too much use of Tognetti's sharp, baroque-influenced violin playing – are actually quite worth the purchase. Although they lack a central theme, they do contain some very enchanting percussion effects and some very interesting orchestral writing. Some of it even seems a little Matrix-inspired, albeit performed in a much subtler way. It's all very dramatic and quite epic. It's just a shame about the terrible sequencing on album. Do some programming on your CD player and you'll end up with at least half an hour of enjoyable, reasonably consistent score music."

James Christopher Monger of AllMusic wrote "the original portion of the score succeeds in riding wave upon wave of tension, but swashbuckling tales of the sea require a memorable tune, not just a storm of Taiko drums and washed-out strings. The composers fare better on a recurring folk medley [...] that captures the true spirit of being miles away from home with your mates and fending off ghostly freighters. The remainder of the soundtrack yields a tad more bounty, utilizing famous classical pieces from Mozart, Bach, and Boccherini to great effect, bailing out the brackish water intent on keeping this ship permanently docked."

Christian Clemmensen of Filmtracks wrote "Overall, this film may not have required an overtly swashbuckling score of the Korngold variety, but the comatose one that was utilized was an extreme detriment to the production. The immense popularity of the soundtrack was caused almost exclusively by the traditional and classical source adaptations. The original score remains amongst the most underachieving and disappointing missed opportunities of the entire decade."

Michael Rechtshaffen of The Hollywood Reporter wrote "Composers Iva Davies, Christopher Gordon and Richard Tognetti furnish the stirring nautical score." Todd McCarthy of Variety wrote "the score inventively incorporates the work of more recent composers with that of the modern Australian team of Iva Davies, Richard Tognetti and Christopher Gordon, which introduces significant percussive and synthesizer effects. Against the odds, this combination of diverse elements coalesces and bridges the gap between authentic period sounds and contemporary excitement." Joe Morgenstern of The Wall Street Journal called it "an unusually distinctive score by Iva Davies, Christopher Gordon and Richard Tognetti".

== Track listing ==
No.	Title	Music	Length
1.	"The Far Side Of The World"	Iva Davies; Christopher Gordon; Richard Tognetti	9:19
2.	"Into The Fog"	Davies; Gordon; Tognetti	2:12
3.	"Violin Concerto No. 3 "Strassburg" K.216, 3rd Movement"	Wolfgang Amadeus Mozart	1:20
4.	"The Cuckold Comes Out Of The Amery"	Davies; Gordon; Tognetti	3:27
5.	"Smoke N'Oakum"	Davies; Gordon; Tognetti	5:28
6.	"Fantasia On A Theme By Thomas Tallis"	Ralph Vaughan Williams	5:15
7.	"Adagio From Concerto Grosso Op. 6, No.8 In G Minor, Christmas Concerto"	Arcangelo Corelli	1:57
8.	"The Doldrums"	Davies; Gordon; Tognetti	2:46
9.	"Prelude (From The Unaccompanied Cello Suite No.1 In G Major, BWV 1007)"	Johann Sebastian Bach	2:28
10.	"The Galapagos"	Davies; Gordon; Tognetti	1:39
11.	"Folk Medley"	Traditional	5:13
12.	"The Phasmid"	Davies; Gordon; Tognetti	2:35
13.	"The Battle"	Davies; Gordon; Tognetti	5:08
14.	"La Musica Notturna Delle Strade Di Madrid (No 6, Op. 30)"	Luigi Boccherini	9:24
15.	"Full Circle"	Davies; Gordon; Tognetti	1:34
Total length:			59:45

== Personnel ==
Credits adapted from liner notes:

- Music composer and producer – Christopher Gordon, Iva Davies, Richard Tognetti
- Orchestrators and conductors – Christopher Gordon, Richard Tognetti
- Percussionists – Michael Fisher
- Digital synthesizer and sample programming – Iva Davies
- Recording – John Kurlander, John Richards, Bobby Fernandez, Simon Leadley
- Digital recordists – Kevin Globerman, Larry Mah
- Score recordist – John Rodd
- Mixing – John Kurlander
- Music editor – Simon Leadley
- Scoring crew – Bill Talbott
- Engineer – Ok Hee Kim
- Studio manager – Jeff Greenberg
- Stage manager – Damon Tedesco, Tom Steel
- Coordinator – Meredith Friedman, Niall O'Rourke
- Copyist – Joann Kane Music Service
- Art direction – Paul Chessell, White Label Productions Ltd
- A&R – Costa Pilavachi, Marc Johnston, Randy Dry
- Executive in charge of music for 20th Century Fox – Robert Kraft
- Executive in charge of soundtracks for Universal Music Group – Kathy Nelson
- Music business affairs for Decca Records – Mark Cavell
- Music business affairs for Fox Music – Tom Cavanaugh
- Music supervision for 20th Century Fox – Mike Knobloch

== Awards and nominations ==
Award	Date of ceremony	Category	Recipients and nominees	Result
ASCAP Film and Television Music Awards	21 April 2004	Top Box Office Films	Iva Davies, Christopher Gordon, Richard Tognetti	Won
Screen Music Awards	24 May 2004	Best Feature Film Score	Iva Davies, Christopher Gordon, Richard Tognetti	Nominated
Screen Music Awards	24 May 2004	Best Soundtrack Album	Iva Davies, Christopher Gordon, Richard Tognetti	Won
World Soundtrack Awards	9 October 2004	Discovery of the Year	Iva Davies, Christopher Gordon, Richard Tognetti	Nominated
