= Cakebread =

Cakebread may refer to:

== People ==
- Dennis Cakebread (born 1938), former English athlete
- Gerry Cakebread (1936-2009), English footballer
- Jane Cakebread (1830-1898), domestic worker and inebriate; the Inebriates Act 1898 was directly due to her case
- Peter Cakebread, British game designer

== Other ==
- Cakebread Cellars, an American winery in Napa Valley
- Cakebread & Walton, a British games company
