= A Drop of Nelson's Blood =

Sea shanty

"A Drop of Nelson's Blood" is a sea shanty, also known as "Roll the old chariot along" (Roud No. 3632) The origins are unclear, but the title comes from the line: "A drop of Nelson's blood wouldn't do us any harm". Often described as a "walkaway" or "runaway chorus" or "stamp and go" sea shanty, the song features on the soundtrack of the 2019 film Fisherman's Friends. The chorus comes from the 19th century Salvation Army hymn, 'Roll the old chariot'.

Each line is sung three times and describes something that the singing sailors would miss while at sea for a long time. The last line is always "And we'll all hang on behind", although some versions say "we won't drag on behind".

== Nelson's blood ==
Following his victory and death at the Battle of Trafalgar, Nelson's body was preserved in a cask of brandy or rum for transport back to England. Though when news of Nelson's death and return to British soil reached the general public, people either 1. argued rum would've been the better alternative or 2. wrongly assumed the body was preserved in rum to begin with. 'Nelson's blood' became a nickname for rum, but it can also mean Nelson's spirit or bravery.

The shanty was sung to accompany certain work tasks aboard sailing ships, especially those that required a bright walking pace. Although Nelson is mentioned in the title, there is no evidence that the shanty dates from the time of Nelson, who died in 1805.

== Origins ==
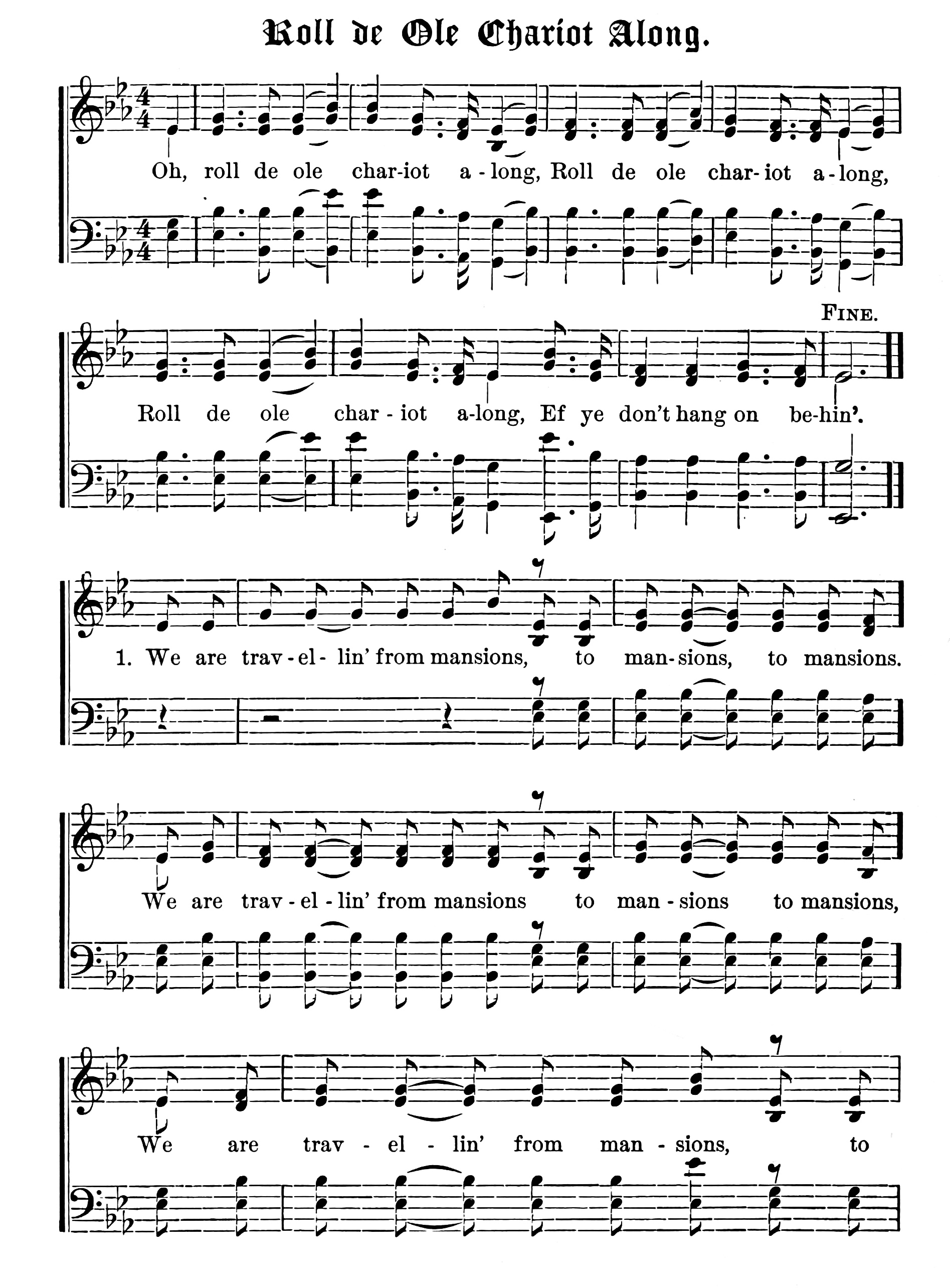
Sheet music for Roll de Ole Chariot Along (1901 version)

The term 'Roll the chariot' was used by religious groups in the 19th century in England. The Primitive Methodist preacher William Clowes mentions the phrase several times in his journals (1810 to that of 1838) describing his work spreading the word of God. In the 1880s, 'Roll the old Chariot' was used by the Salvation Army as a campaign hymn. At around the same time Gospel singers from America were touring in the UK, singing gospel songs.

'Roll the old chariot along'

Refrain:
Roll the old chariot along
And we'll roll the old chariot along
And we'll roll the old chariot along
And we'll all hang on behind.

If the devil's in the way, We'll roll it over him x 3
And we'll all hang on behind.

=== Early recordings (Gospel version) ===
One of the oldest known recordings, dates from the early 1920s and is held by the Library of Congress. The wax cylinder was donated by Robert Winslow Gordon.

- An African-American spiritual version was recorded by Paul Robeson in the 1920s
- 1930 Roll the Old Chariot Along by Rev. T.T. Rose
- Fela Sowande titled 'Roll de ol chariot' was recorded in the 1950s

=== In print ===
- An early publication of the song in America was published in 'Cabin and plantation songs' (1901).
- Alec John Dawson in an article that was published in The Standard in 1906.
- The song is mentioned by James Madison Carpenter in his collection of songs published in 1920.
- According to John Greenway in his book Folk Nation: Folklore in the Creation of American Tradition, it became a protest song for the coal miners.

== Notable recordings (shanty version) ==
- 1978 American folksinger Mary Benson of Portland, Oregon, used the shanty on her album Sea Songs Seattle, released on Folkways Records.
- 1983 Jim Mageean and Johnny Collins sang "Roll the Old Chariot" on their album Strontrace!.
- 2006 Jarvis Cocker appeared on the album Rogue's Gallery: Pirate Ballads, Sea Songs, and Chanteys
- 2010 David Coffin posted a version on YouTube which now has over six million views as of December 2025
- 2012 Storm Weather Shanty Choir released an album named after the song which features the song as the opening track.
- 2013 The Wellington Sea Shanty Society released a version of the song on their album Now That's What I Call Sea Shanties Vol. 1.
- 2015 The season two episode "A More Perfect Union" of TV series The Last Ship features a version with the crew singing a verse featuring the name of their ship: "We'll be alright because we sail the Nathan James".
- 2021 Industrial/Steampunk band Abney Park released a version on their album "Technoshanties"
- 2022 Nathan Evans recorded the song under the title "Roll the Old Chariot" on The Wellerman Album
- 2023 The Longest Johns added their version to their album "The C-Sides", under the title "Drop of Nelsons Blood"
