= Retro-Future Vagabond =

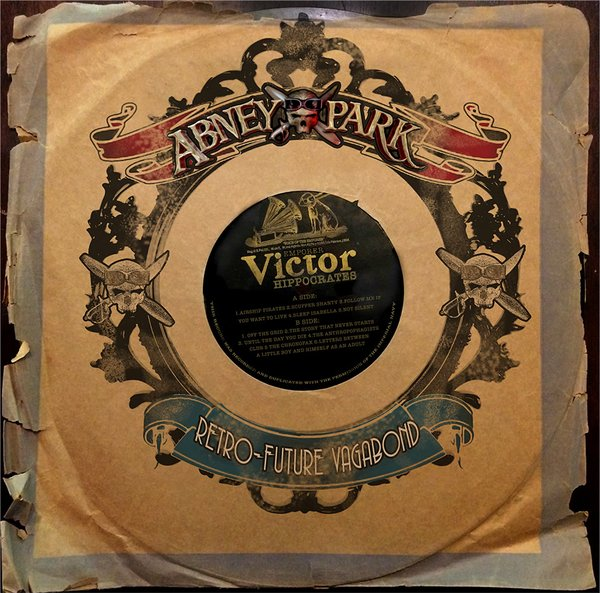

Compilation album by Abney Park
- Released: May 1, 2015
- Label: soundsUP records

Abney Park chronology
PegasiaMusic008: The Lost Journals: Volume I (2009)	Retro-Future Vagabond (2015)

Retro-Future Vagabond is the second compilation album by steampunk band Abney Park, published exclusively on vinyl only by German vinyl label soundsUP records. The album was released on May 1, 2014, and was limited to 500 copies worldwide. All the songs were mastered for the vinyl from the source material by Andreas Kauffelt at Schnittstelle Studios (Frankfurt).

== Artwork ==
The artwork for the album was created by "Captain" Robert and features a stylized old LP cover.

== Track selection ==
After several polls on his official Facebook page, the track list had been selected by "Captain" Robert.

"Retro-Future Vagabond" isn't a "best of", or a "greatest hits", it's more of a collection of songs I deem important enough to want etched into the only permanent medium for music left to man kind. If cared for, a record will play hundreds of years in the future. This is our legacy.

— "Captain" Robert, official Abney Park press release

== Track listing ==
Side one

1. "Airship Pirate" – 4:00
2. "Scupper Shanty" – 2:56
3. "Follow Me If You Want To Live" – 3:23
4. "Sleep Isabella" – 4:27
5. "Not Silent" – 4:06

Side two

5. "Off The Grid" – 2:37
6. "The Story That Never Starts" – 4:07
7. "Until The Day You Die" – 2:46
8. "The Anthropophagists' Club" – 3:38
9. "Chronofax (Letter Between A Little Boy & Himself As An Adult)" – 4:19

== Personnel ==
=== Regular band members ===
- "Captain" Robert Brown - songs, singing, bouzouki, harmonica, accordion, darbuka
- Kristina Erickson - keyboards, piano
- Nathaniel Johnstone - violin, guitar, banjo, mandolin
- Daniel Cederman - bass
- Jody Ellen - voice

=== Guest artists ===
- Richard Lopez - trombone, alto flute
- Carey Rayburn - vintage muted trumpet
- Erica "Unwoman" Mulkey - cello
