= I Am Stretched on Your Grave =

17th-century Irish poem

Song
- Written: Unknown
- Songwriter: Unknown

"I Am Stretched on Your Grave" is a translation of an anonymous 17th-century Irish poem titled "Táim sínte ar do thuama". It was translated into English several times, most notably by Frank O'Connor.

"Táim Sínte ar do Thuama", has been paired with music in at least two unrelated works: in Hymn #47 of Danta De: Idir Sean agus Nuad (the Trinity Sunday hymn "Dia an t-Athair do shealbhaig flaitheas naomhtha", 1928), credited to Munster, and in "I Am Stretched on Your Grave" by musician Philip King in 1979.

The popular and current versions are influenced or rely heavily on the adapted version by King, which was recorded on the group Scullion's first album from 1979 on the Mulligan Records label (called Scullion) and titled "I Am Stretched on Your Grave".

== Album recordings ==
Artist	Album	Notes	Release year
Scullion	Scullion (self-titled)		1979
Sinéad O'Connor	I Do Not Want What I Haven't Got	Credited King	1990
The Voice Squad	Holly Wood (TARA 4013),		1992
Dead Can Dance	Toward the Within	Credited King/O'Connor	1993
The Lennon Family	Dúchas Ceoil (CEFCD 167)		1995
Kate Rusby	Hourglass	Credited King/O'Connor but altered it melodically	1997
Eden	Fire and Rain		1997
Peter Mulvey (with backing vocals by Juliet Turner)	Glencree	Live album	1999
Blood Axis and In Gowan Ring	Witch-Hunt: The Rites of Samhain	Live collaborative album	1999
The Bringers	It's About Time		2000
Eden	Fire and Rain		1997
Iarla Ó Lionáird	I Could Read the Sky,	Film soundtrack	2000
Peta Webb (of the band "Oak") and Ken Hall	As Close As Can Be (Fellside Records)	Credited P.King/F.O'Connor/Trad	2002
Drunk and Disorderly	Second Edition		2006
Charlotte Martin	Reproductions		2007
Billy Miller & Misti Bernard	Moon Pale & Midnight		2007
Abney Park	Lost Horizons		2008
Runa	Stretched on Your Grave		2011
Jennifer Culley Curtin	Comfort for the Comfortless		2011
Johnny Hollow	A Collection of Creatures		2014
Craic in the Stone	Say Yes to Craic		2014
Eithne Ní Uallacháin	Bilingua (Gael Linn CEFCD206)	New melody	2015
The Lasses	Daughters		2015
The New Customs	All Walls Fall		2017
Frank Harte	When Adam Was In Paradise: Traditional Songs of Love and Courtship	Posthumous album	2025
