= The Death of Tragedy =

The Death of Tragedy may refer to:

- The Death of Tragedy (Abney Park album) (2005)
- The Death of Tragedy (Tragedy Khadafi album) (2007)
- The Death of Tragedy, a 1961 work of literary criticism by George Steiner
