= Mageean =

Mageean is a surname of Irish origin.

Notable people with the surname include:

- Ciara Mageean (1992–2026), middle-distance runner from Ireland
- Daniel Mageean (1882–1962), Catholic Bishop of Down and Connor, Ireland
- Jim Mageean (born 1948), folk singer from Tyne and Wear, England

== See also ==
- Mageean Cup, in the Ulster Colleges' Senior Hurling Championship
