= The Northumbria Anthology =

Collection of music and poems

The Northumbria Anthology is a collection of music and poems derived from the North East of England. The Anthology is a musical celebration of the history and culture of this region. The collection spans musical boundaries from folk and rock to classical and traditional music hall styles. These songs and poems have been recorded by some of the North East's most established artists and have been released and distributed through Newcastle Label Mawson & Wareham (music) Ltd.

== About ==
The Northumbria Anthology is a non-profit making organisation which relies upon sales and revenue.

Brian and Helen Mawson of Newcastle label Mawson & Wareham asked Geordie musician Johnny Handle to compile the material, mainly from the 19th and 20th centuries. From this archive of over 3000 titles, they chose the tracks that would be recorded for the first part of the anthology; a twenty CD box set featuring over 60 local artists (including:Sting, Bryan Ferry, Jimmy Nail, Lindisfarne, Robson Green and Dave Stewart)and 289 songs.

== Artists ==
The Northumbria Anthology has worked with many established artists including:

Robert Allen, Thomas Allen, Ron Angel, Sheila Armstrong, Eric Boswell, Owen Brannigan, Canticle, C Ernest Catcheside-Warrington, Suzannah Clarke, David Clelland, Terry Conway, Graeme Danby, Johnny Dickinson, Judy Dinning, Mike Elliott, Billy Fane, Bryan Ferry, Gracie Fields, Bob Fox, Vin Garbutt, Alex Glasgow, Benny Graham, Richard Grainger, Robson Green, Jed Grimes, Johnny Handle, David Haslam, Ralph Hawkes, Tim Healy, The High Level Ranters, George House, The Hush, Brian Johnson, Liz Law, Freddie 'Fingers' Lee, Lindisfarne, Billy Mitchell, Jimmy Nail, Harry Nelson, Northern Sinfonia, The Sinfonia Chorus, Anne-Marie Owens, Ed Pickford, Jim Mageean, Alan Price, Valerie Reid, Bill Robinson, Claire Rutter, J C Scatter, Mo Scott, Pete Scott, Bob Smeaton, Dave Stewart, Sting, Ian Storey, Ray Stubbs, Mary Thomson, Jane Wade, Brian Watson, Denis Weatherley, Denise Welch, Kevin Whately, Geoff Wonfor, John Woodvine. Mosh Pit Mayhem Radio Presenters
