= Lost Horizon (disambiguation) =

Lost Horizon is a fantasy adventure novel by James Hilton.

Lost Horizon or Lost Horizons may also refer to:

== Film and television ==
- Lost Horizon (1937 film), an adaptation of the novel
- Lost Horizon (1973 film), a remake of the 1937 film
- "Lost Horizon" (Mad Men), an episode of the television series Mad Men
- The Lost Horizon, a 1996 Indian environmental short animated film by Arun Gongade, winner of the National Film Award for Best Non-Feature Animation Film

== Music ==
- Lost Horizon (band), a Swedish metal band
- Lost Horizons (Lemon Jelly album), 2002
- Lost Horizons (Luca Turilli's Dreamquest album), 2006
- Lost Horizons (Abney Park album), 2008
- "Lost Horizons" (Gin Blossoms song), 1992

== Other uses ==
- Lost Horizon (video game), an adventure game by Animation Arts
