= Æther Shanties =

Studio album by Abney Park
- Released: December 1, 2009
- Genre: Industrial rock; electro swing; dark cabaret; sea shanty
- Label: Abney Park

Abney Park chronology
Dark Christmas (2009)	Æther Shanties (2009)	The End of Days (2010)

Æther Shanties is the seventh studio album by steampunk band Abney Park. It is subtitled Further Trials and Tribulations of Abney Park. It is also their second steampunk-themed album.

== Recording ==
According to an interview with Robert the album was 95% done recording when a heatwave hit Seattle, destroying their hard-drive. This event allowed them to add the vocals of their new singer, Jody Ellen, onto the album, but delayed the release of the album for several months.

== Track listing ==
No.	Title	Length
1.	"Under the Radar"	2:58
2.	"Building Steam"	4:00
3.	"Until the Day You Die"	2:46
4.	"My Life"	3:05
5.	"Wanderlust"	2:53
6.	"Throw Them Overboard"	3:15
7.	"The Derelict"	3:17
8.	"Victoria"	4:43
9.	"Æther Shanty"	2:48
10.	"The Clock Yard"	3:26
11.	"Too Far to Turn Back"	3:21

== Personnel ==
- Robert Brown – songs, vocals, darbuka, diatonic button accordion, harmonica, bouzouki
- Kristina Erickson – keyboards, piano
- Nathaniel Johnstone – guitar, violin, mandolin
- Daniel Cederman – bass, acoustic guitar
- Jody Ellen – secondary vocals
