= Dark Streets =

Dark Streets may refer to:

- Dark Streets (1929 film), a lost American pre-Code crime film
- Dark Streets (2008 film), a film adaptation of the play by Glenn M. Stewart
- Dark Streets (RPG), a horror role-playing game
- "Dark Streets" (Falcon Crest), a 1990 television episode
