= The End of Days =

Studio album by Abney Park
- Released: October 15, 2010
- Genre: Folktronica; sea shanty; dark cabaret; industrial rock
- Label: Abney Park

Abney Park chronology
Æther Shanties (2009)	The End of Days (2010)	Off the Grid (2011)

The End of Days is the eighth studio album by steampunk band Abney Park, and their third steampunk-themed album. The album was released on October 15, 2010.

== Digital release ==
The album was released for download on November 2, 2010, three weeks after the release of the physical album.

== Track listing ==
1. "The End of Days" - 3:24
2. "Neobedouin" - 3:41
3. "The Wrath of Fate" - 3:05
4. "I've Been Wrong Before" - 2:54
5. "Inside the Cage" - 0:21
6. "Fight or Flight" - 3:15
7. "Victorian Vigilante" - 4:12
8. "Chronograph" - 0:32
9. "Letters Between a Little Boy and Himself as an Adult" - 3:47
10. "Beautiful Decline" - 4:04
11. "Off the Grid" - 2:36
12. "To The Apocalypse in Daddy's Sidecar" - 4:02
13. "Space Cowboy" - 3:11

== Personnel ==
=== Regular band members ===
- "Captain" Robert Brown - songs, singing, bouzouki, harmonica, accordion, darbuka
- Kristina Erickson - keyboards, piano
- Nathaniel Johnstone - violin, guitar, banjo, mandolin
- Daniel Cederman - bass
- Jody Ellen - voice

=== Guest artists ===
- Richard Lopez - trombone, alto flute
- Carey Rayburn - vintage muted trumpet
- Erica "Unwoman" Mulkey - cello
