= Nathan F. Cobb =

19th-century American schooner

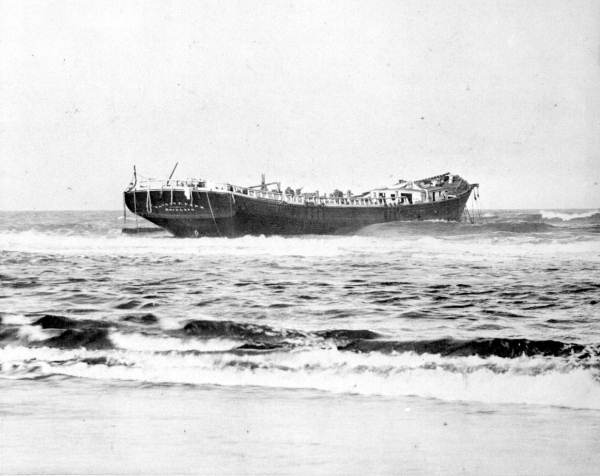
- Nathan F. Cobb grounded on Ormond Beach in 1896

History
- Name: Nathan F. Cobb
- Port of registry: Rockland, Maine
- In service: 1890
- Fate: Wrecked in 1896

General characteristics
- Type: Schooner
- Tonnage: 656
- Length: 167.2 ft (51.0 m)
- Beam: 35.1 ft (10.7 m)
- Draft: 12.7 ft (3.9 m)
- Sail plan: Three masted square rig

Nathan F. Cobb was a three-masted schooner named after the shipbuilder and founder of Cobb's Salvaging Company whose many rescues of stranded ships help lead to the formation of the United States Life-Saving Service. Despite its namesake's history of shipwreck rescues, the Nathan F. Cobb capsized in heavy seas on 1 December 1896 en route from Brunswick, Georgia to New York with a cargo of timber and cross ties. The cook and a shipmate drowned when they were swept overboard in violent seas. The crew righted the vessel by removing the three masts and they drifted for four days until they became grounded on a sandbar off Ormond Beach, Florida. Rescue attempts led to the drowning of volunteer Fred Waterhouse, whose body was never recovered, but no other crew members were lost. A plaque commemorates Waterhouse's rescue efforts. The Cobb Cottage, a structure built using materials salvaged from the ship, is part of Ormond Beach's Historic Trail.

== History ==
Nathan F. Cobb of Rockland, Maine was a three-masted, square-rigged schooner constructed in 1890. Information related to many ships built in Rockland between the years of 1837 and 1920 is generally sparse. In his six volume set titled Merchant Sail, William Armstrong Fairburn describes the landscape regarding construction and registration information for ships built in Rockland during the aforementioned era:

It is to be regretted that the desired data covering construction and registration at most Maine ports have not been preserved, recorded, and made available for inspection locally; that the records still in existence—and that have not been destroyed or lost—are scattered; the tabulations of the data on hand attempted during recent years by the P.W.A. (Pemaquid Watershed Association) are incomplete; and that such records as have been made available are for vessels catalogued alphabetically instead of chronologically.

— William Armstrong Fairburn, Merchant Sail Volume V, page 3419

Fairburn cites Customhouse Records with recording information about 275 vessels registered as built in Rockland between 1837 and 1920. Among the vessels listed is the Nathan F. Cobb, which ranged 167.2 feet (51.0 m) in length, measured 656 tons, drafted 12.7 feet (3.9 m) of water and had a beam width of 35.1 feet (10.7 m).

== Final voyage ==
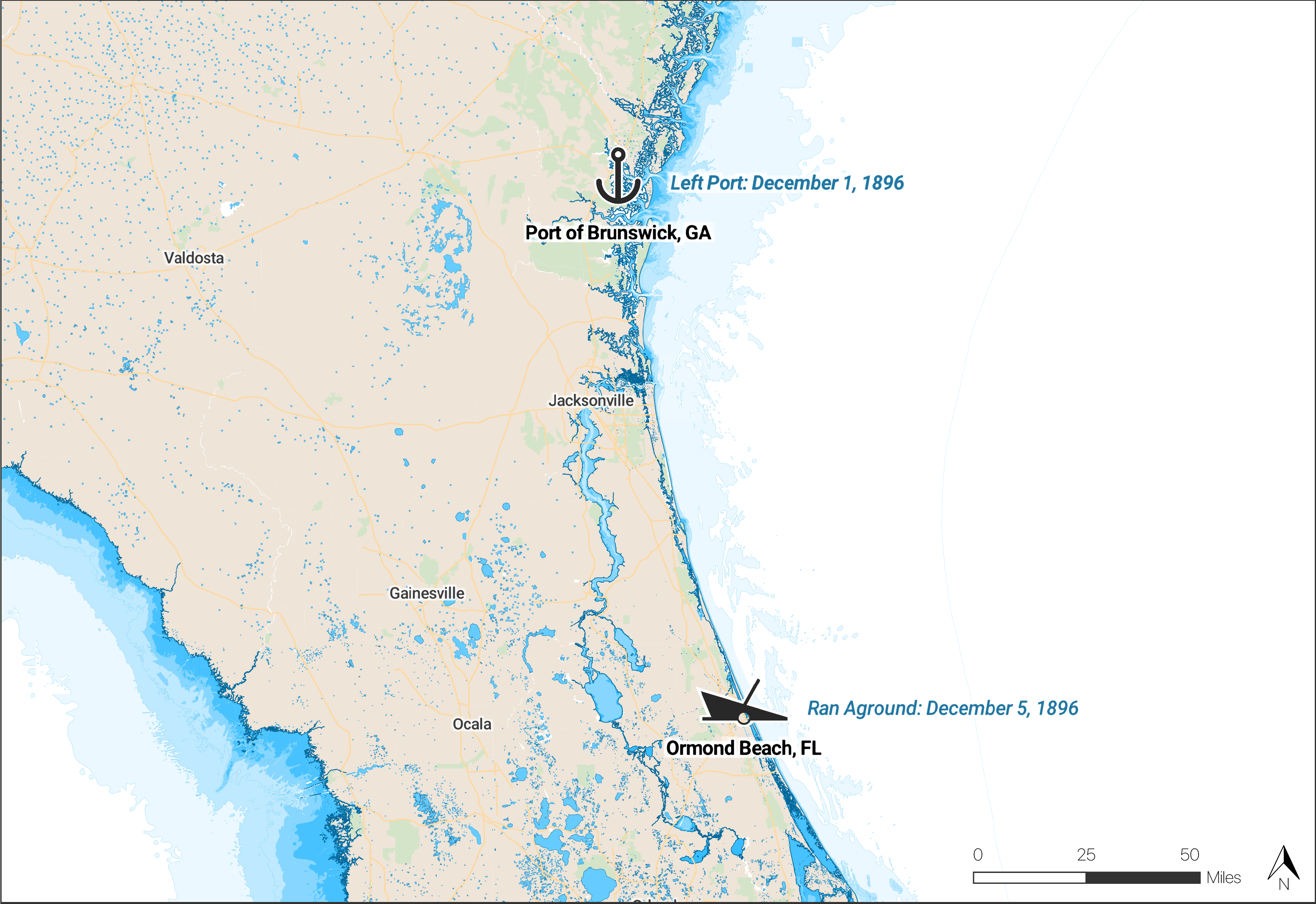
The origin and endpoint of Nathan F. Cobb's final voyage

On its last voyage the Cobb was scheduled to transport a cargo of timber and cross ties from Brunswick, Georgia to New York. On 1 December 1896, after leaving port from Brunswick, the schooner fell victim to the strong winds and high seas associated with Nor'easters. Gale force winds ripped the vessel's sails from their masts and rough seas capsized the ship to its beam ends. The crew was able to right the distressed vessel by removing the main and mizzen masts, but this left the Nathan F. Cobb vulnerable since it was powerless and waterlogged. Despite the cabin being swept away by the sea, the ship's hull was kept relatively intact during this sequence of events. Both a cook and a shipmate drowned in the violent seas. On the morning of 5 December 1896 the Nathan F. Cobb ran aground on a near shore sandbar roughly 1,000 feet (300 m) off the coast of Ormond Beach, Florida.

== Rescue efforts ==
J.D. Price and John Anderson built the Ormond Hotel in 1888 and sold it to Henry Flagler in 1891. While Flagler took over ownership responsibilities, he retained Price as the hotel's manager. On the morning of 5 December 1896, then Ormond Hotel manager J.D. Price, noticed the stranded vessel in the surf and gathered a group of people to assist in the rescue efforts. After learning of the disaster, Superintendent Hiram B. Shaw of the United States Life-Saving Service's Seventh Life-Saving District, hastened to the scene to assess the situation. Shaw quickly telegraphed for permission to have a life saving beach apparatus sent to him by train from Jupiter, Florida where the Jupiter Inlet Life Saving Station was located, approximately 180 miles (290 km) south of Ormond Beach. This was quickly granted by General Superintendent Sumner Increase Kimball. Because of the proximity and travel time from the Jupiter Inlet Station to Ormond Beach, Shaw had his small surf boat wheeled down to the beach on a man-drawn wagon. He then went into town to procure necessary equipment and rope lines for the rescue.

In total, about fifty people came together on the beach. Due to the tumultuous conditions, it was decided that no rescue attempts would be made until low tide at 11:00 a.m. The first rescue boat set out at nearly low tide. With a rope attached to its stern from shore, hotel painter Edward DeCourcy and another hotel staff member manned Shaw's small rowboat. Although they successfully made it beyond the breakers, the rowboat succumbed to the strong southerly current; missing the float line thrown from the schooner by five feet. They were forced to come in. Five more unsuccessful attempts were made to reach the grounded vessel.

Next, a small metallic dingy, known as an iron yawl, was carried down to the beach. Tom Fagen and Fred Waterhouse manned the yawl, in another attempt to reach the grounded schooner. Through skilled seamanship, they made it to the second set of breakers, only a short distance from the vessel. When they tried to reach the float line, a large wave struck them leaving their boat filled with water. The two men abandoned their yawl. Fagen managed to swim ashore and was met by volunteers close to the beach half-drowned. Waterhouse decided against swimming to shore. When he saw that the yawl had flipped, he swam back to it and straddled the hull. The men on the shore began pulling the flipped boat in, but another wave broke on top of it throwing Waterhouse into the water and righting the yawl. Waterhouse climbed back into the boat and began getting pulled in again, only to be capsized shortly thereafter. This time Waterhouse surfaced, appearing dazed and grasping onto an oar. Shaw's rescue boat was put back in the water, but Waterhouse had already gone under and presumably drowned to death a short time later. Fred Waterhouse's body was never recovered, despite several searches.

Hiram B. Shaw had just returned to the beach when this casualty occurred. After supplying his small rescue boat with more rope lines, he and Edward DeCourcy removed their outer clothing and prepared to embark. The men on the Cobb, who had just witnessed Waterhouse's drowning, prompted the captain of the schooner to give an impassioned address in which he said, "They have sacrificed one man in their efforts to save us; now I'll risk my life in an attempt to get ashore." The captain tied a rope around his waist and jumped into the water, just as the rescue boat had set out from shore. After battling against the current and waves, he was met by Shaw's rescue boat and clung to its stern until they reached land. Making use of the captain's line, the men on shore tied a life preserver to it. One at a time, the five stranded crewmen pulled the flotation device out to the schooner, fastened it to their bodies and were pulled to safety by the people on the shore. After receiving a cup of hot coffee, a drink of whiskey and a blanket, the Cobb's crew were taken to Coquina, Ormond Beach's area hospital.

Upon hearing the story, General Superintendent Sumner Increase Kimball of the United States Life-Saving Service wrote a letter of praise to Edward DeCourcy for his selflessness and bravery; also acknowledging the many others involved.

== Nathan Cobb Cottage ==
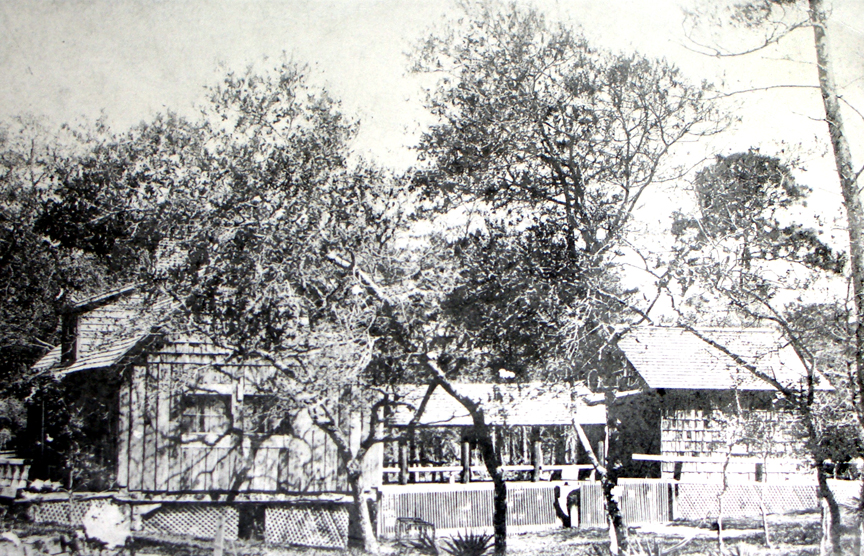
Cobb Cottage, erected from materials salvaged after Nathan F. Cobb shipwreck

The Nathan Cobb Cottage was built using materials salvaged from the ship. William "Billy" C. Fagen was given permission to use the material to aid in the construction of the main cottage structure and its outer kitchen and dog-trot (breezeway). Materials used from the wreck included railroad ties to form the exterior walls. The schooner's salvaged wooden quarter board included the engraved name of "Nathan F. Cobb". It was originally affixed to the exterior south side wall, but now hangs over the south side interior wall of the living room. The house is now part of Ormond Beach's Historic Trail.

== Location ==
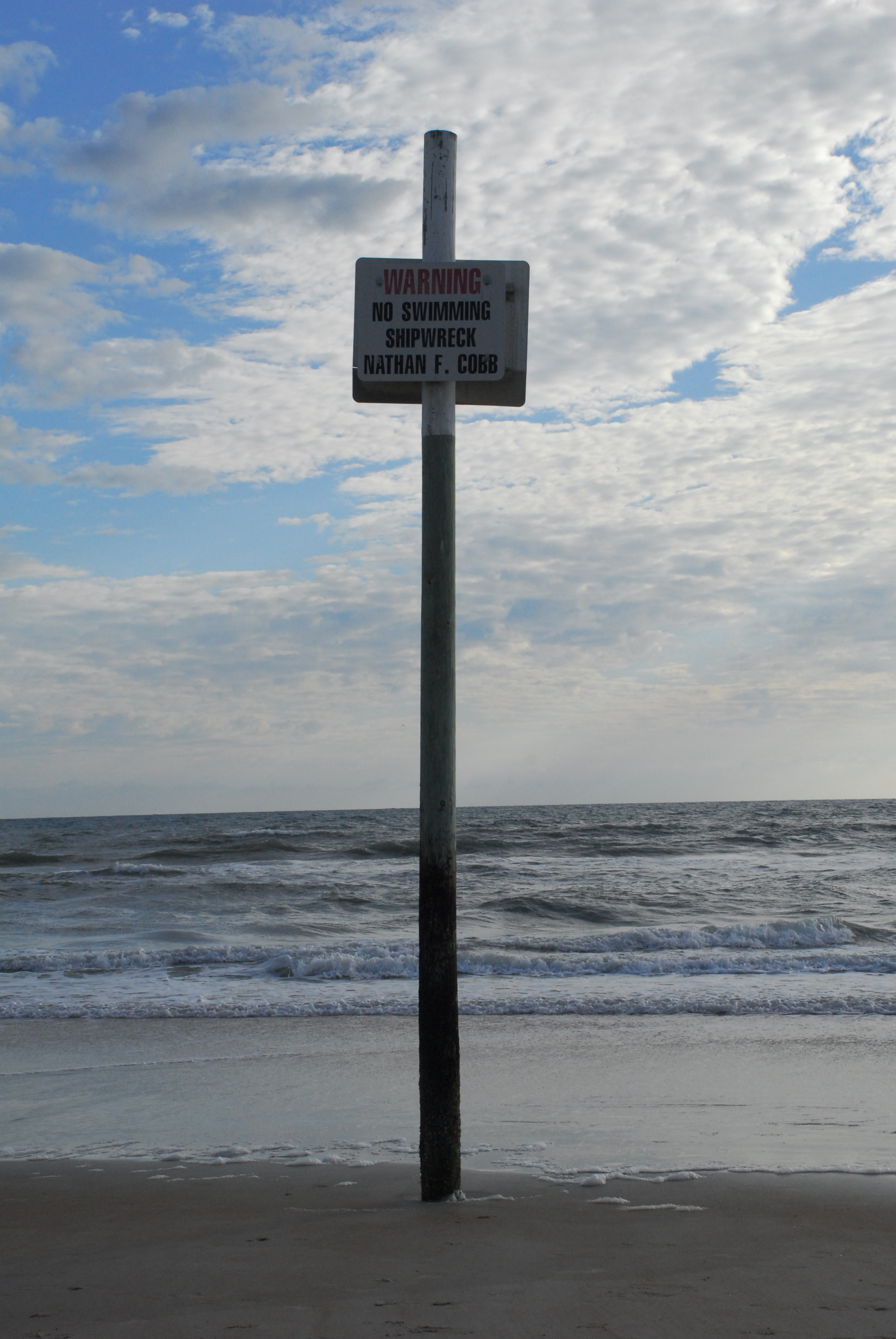
Nathan F. Cobb shipwreck sign on Ormond Beach, Florida

The location of Nathan F. Cobb's wreck is designated by a sign to warn swimmers. It is anchored in or near the water's edge depending on the tide. The hull of the ship became visible for brief period in May 2004 after shifting sands and a very low tide coincided simultaneously. The sign is located at 29°16′38″N 81°1′53″W on Ormond Beach. Previously, a large boulder had been sent from Freed Waterhouse's hometown of Cape Elizabeth, Maine, decorated with a bronze plaque commemorating his brave rescue efforts. This monument was prominently placed in the sand dunes near the site where the ship ran aground, but in July 1972 the plaque was vandalized and broken off. After the plaque was reattached to the boulder, it was relocated to the Fire station north of the Casa Del Mar on A1A, where it currently sits.The sign has been recently washed away by a hurricane.

== Newspaper coverage ==
Despite limited information about its service routes and construction, the Nathan F. Cobb was the subject of two separate New York Times articles during its short career. One article reported the wreck the day after it occurred, the other article came from 20 June 1892 and chronicled a disturbance between mates. The Nathan F. Cobb was still in tow only three miles (4.8 km) outside Mobile Bay, beginning its route from Mobile, Alabama to New York, when mate Henry Shaffer jumped over board to avoid a beating. Another mate, J. Trott had already used a belaying pin to half kill another seaman on the schooner and Shaffer was fearful for his life. Shaffer began swimming towards a nearby lighthouse and was picked up nearly five miles (8.0 km) from where he jumped over board. The captain of the towboat reported that Captain Cookson of the Nathan F. Cobb, mentioned incidentally they had lost a crewman. Both Cookson and Trott already had pending charges against them for cruelty and marooning of sailors, stemming from an incident in May 1891 at Calcasieu Pass, Louisiana.

== Forerunner of the United States Life-Saving Service ==
Nathan F. Cobb was named after a ship builder, born in 1797 from Eastham, Massachusetts on Cape Cod. Cobb and his family moved from Eastham to Northampton County, Virginia before purchasing Sand Shoal Island, which later became Cobb's Island. It was on Cobb's Island, in 1839, that Nathan founded Cobb's Salvaging Company with his sons. They specialized in wrecking and salvaging stranded vessels along the shallow Mid-Atlantic coastline. The Cobbs had a remarkable record; not one person drowned in any of the rescue efforts for the 37 or more ships stranded off their island. The success of the salvaging company earned them the sobriquet "Rothschilds among the toilers of the sea". Despite the company's notable prosperity, the Cobbs were often praised for their humanity and general regard for human life, "Often a crew of ten or twenty would be landed on the island from stranded vessels without a penny, and they were tenderly cared for as though they were millionaires." This practice was a rare creed among wreckers in the 19th century. The Cobbs and others like them transformed the act of salvaging which led way to the forming of the United States Life-Saving Service; this later merged into what is now the United States Coast Guard.
