= Stigmata Martyr =

At least two albums contain a song called "Stigmata Martyr":

- In the Flat Field, the debut album by British gothic rock band Bauhaus, released 1980
- The Death of Tragedy (Abney Park album), released 2005
