= Robert Allen (poet) =

English farmer and poet (1920–2007)

Robert Allen (25 April 1920 – 18 April 2007) was an English farmer and poet from Northumberland.

== Life and career ==
Allen was born in Northumberland on 25 April 1920. After completing his military service, he gained farm experience at a farm near Prendwick (11 miles west of Alnwick), Northumberland. In 1950, he moved to Redesmouth Farm, Redesmouth, near Bellingham, which was owned by his father, Colonel Allen of Haydon Bridge. That same year, he married Angela Mary Hall (née Grey; 1918–2007) in Northumberland.

When he retired, he and his wife moved into a new house named "The Glebe" in Bellingham. Allen always had an interest in his local dialect, which he called "big hoose terk", the gentle and polite dialect used when talking to the vicar, rather than the more common and normal "village talk" and also in poetry, and his retirement allowed him the time to put the two together and write down the results.

He produced three audio tapes of his poems "The Canniest Place on Earth", "Ridin' High" and "The Lang Pack", and eventually, in 1994, he published the whole in a book Canny Bit Verse, illustrated by local poet/illustrator and neighbouring farmer Henry Brewis.

Robert Allen died in Northumberland on 18 April 2007, at the age of 86. His wife, Angela, had died earlier that same year, in Northumberland, at the age of 88.

== Works ==
=== Poems ===
- Bonnie North Tyne
- Canny Welcome (A)
- Cautionary Tale (A)
- Corbie Crow (The)
- Costly chimney cowl (The)
- End O’ Lambin Day
- Grittor (The)
- Lot Of It Aboot (A)
- Owld Farmor's Advice (The)
- Owld Men's Thowts
- Spuggies
- Whee's Deed Collum (The)

=== Prose ===
- God's Bairn A Northumbrian version of the Christmas story

=== Collection ===
- Canny Bit Verse The contents of three audio cassettes of Northumbrian dialect verse translated into a single book of poems, which between them praise the valley of the North Tyne, talk about local village cricket, or tell of sad occurrences as in the whee's deid (obituary) column, and according to the sales details "and for those who don't know their cushat (wood pigeon) from their shavie (chaffinch), there's a glossary of dialect words"

== See also ==
- Geordie dialect words
- Canny Bit Verse
- The Northumbria Anthology
- Henry Brewis
