= SoundsUP records =

soundsUP Records
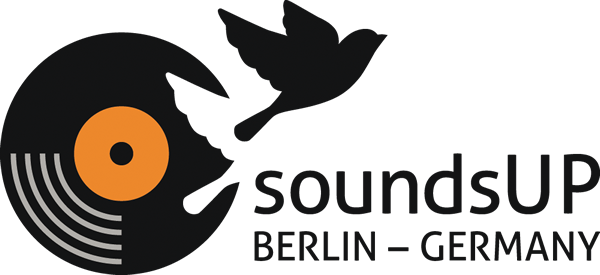
- Founded: 2013
- Founder: Philipp Rolbin
- Status: active
- Genre: Rock music
- Country of origin: Germany
- Location: Berlin
- Official website: http://soundsup.pro/

soundsUP Records is an independent record label founded in 2013 in Berlin, Germany. The label specifies on releasing vinyl records only, mostly specializing on rock music.

== Music ==
More recent signings include names such as Viza, Blindead, Poets Of The Fall, Abney Park and The Chronicles of Israfel.

== See also ==
- List of record labels
