= Canny Bit Verse =

1994 book by Robert Allen

Canny Bit Verse; by Robert Allen
- Author: Robert Allen
- Language: English, much in Geordie dialect
- Genre: dialect poetry book
- Publisher: Robert Allen
- Publication date: 1994
- Publication place: United Kingdom
- Media type: Print
- Pages: 128
- ISBN: 978-0952464907

Canny Bit Verse is a book, written and published by poet Robert Allen from Northumberland, England, in 1994. It contains a variety of poems, which between them praise the valley of the North Tyne, talk about local village cricket, or tell of sad occurrences as in the "whee's deid" (obituary) column, and according to the sales details "and for those who don't know their cushat (wood pigeon) from their shavie (chaffinch), there's a glossary of dialect words".

The poems were written at an earlier date and had been recorded by Allen on to three audio tapes, which he had produced; these are The Canniest Place on Eorth, Ridin' High and The Lang Pack.

The 128-page book is illustrated by local writer and artist Henry Brewis.

The Northumbrian Language Society, of which Allen was a founder member, is the sole supplier of this and others of his books and recordings.

== Contents ==
The contents cover many topics, mainly written in Northumbrian Dialect, often very broad.

Below is a list of a few of the contents of the book:

=== Poems ===
- Bonnie North Tyne
- A Canny Welcome
- A Cautionary Tale
- The Corbie Crow
- The Costly chimney cowl
- End O' Lambin Day
- The Grittor
- A Lot Of It Aboot
- The Owld Farmor's Advice
- The Owld Men's Thowts
- Spuggies
- The Whee's Deed Collum

=== Prose ===
- God’s Bairn A Northumbrian version of the Christmas story
