= The Ghost of Time =

Studio album by Iva Davies
- Released: 1999
- Genres: Electronic, rock
- Labels: Roadshow Music, Diva Records
- Producer: Iva Davies

The Ghost of Time is a 1999 album and subsequent live show by Iva Davies. Davies was commissioned to perform for the Sydney Harbor's New Year's Eve event. For the show he reworked "Great Southern Land" into a 45-minute work. This was released as an album in the lead up to the show. The Millennial New Years performance played on Bennelong Point began at 11:30pm. The show featured Davies performing with Richard Tognetti, Rom=Pari, taiko drummers and the Sydney Symphony Orchestra and was arranged by Christopher Gordon.

Stephen Cauchi of the Age gave the album 3 1/2 stars and wrote "Enjoyable listening? If you like a hefty dose of soaring, occasionally spooky ambience, reminiscent in parts of Brian Eno's better mood pieces, then yes." Peter Holmes in the Sun Herald gave it 7/10 and says "In a sense Iva Davies was on a hiding to nothing by reworking his widescreen Great Southern Land for performance at the Opera House on New Year's Eve. Why tamper? While the string arrangement Endless Ocean serves little purpose, the other three pieces are based around – and complement – the original." Newcastle Herald's Chad Watson wrote "The Ghost of Time, with its high emotion and strung-out eeriness, means this recording is not for everyone. But those who appreciate interpretive efforts will be haunted by this mammoth, multi-layered slice of nationalistic world music."

At the 2000 ARIA Music Awards the album was nominated for the for Best Original Soundtrack Album and Davies and Simon Leadley won the ARIA Award for Engineer of the Year. It peaked at number 63 on the ARIA Albums Chart.

Having seen the Sydney Opera House performance on television, Australian film director Peter Weir subsequently contacted Davies. Weir commissioned Davies to "based on that style" compose the musical score soundtrack for his 2003 movie Master and Commander: The Far Side of the World.

== Track listing ==
1. Great Southern Land (2000)
2. Walk Alone
3. Endless Ocean
4. The Ghost of Time

== Personnel ==
- Iva Davies – Producer, Vocals, Guitar, Bass, Keyboards, Sampler, Computer
- Richard Tognetti – Violin
- Sydney Symphony Orchestra – Orchestra
- Christopher Gordon – Conductor
- Guy Pratt – Bass
- Taikoz – Taiko drums
- Rom=Pari – Sampler, Drum programming
