= Lost Horizons (Abney Park album) =

Studio album by Abney Park
- Released: 2008
- Genre: Industrial rock; sea shanty; dark wave
- Label: Abney Park

Abney Park chronology
The Death of Tragedy (2005)	Lost Horizons (2008)	Dark Christmas (2009)

Lost Horizons is the sixth studio album by Abney Park, subtitled The Continuing Adventures of Abney Park. Released in 2008, it is the band's first steampunk-themed album.

== Track listing ==
1. "Airship Pirate"
2. "The Emperor’s Wives"
3. "Sleep Isabella"
4. "She"
5. "The Secret Life Of Doctor Calgori"
6. "This Dark And Twisty Road"
7. "Herr Drosselmeyer's Doll"
8. "Virus"
9. "I Am Stretched on Your Grave"
10. "Post-Apocalypse Punk"
11. "The Ballad of Captain Robert" (hidden track)

== In popular culture ==
"Sleep Isabella" was used in a scene in the HBO series True Blood, Season 5 Episode 4.
