= Cakebread & Walton =

British game publisher

- Type: Privately held company
- Industry: Game publisher
- Founded: 2009
- Founder: Peter Cakebread and Ken Walton
- Headquarters: Lancaster, United Kingdom
- Key people: Peter Cakebread and Ken Walton
- Products: Abney Park's Airship Pirates, Clockwork & Chivalry, Renaissance Deluxe, Dark Streets (RPG), Pirates & Dragons, One Dice,
- Website: cakebreadandwalton.co.uk

Cakebread & Walton is a British games company that creates and publishes tabletop games. Best known for its Clockwork & Chivalry, Renaissance System and Abney Park's Airship Pirates games, they also offer titles covering a range of licensed and self-developed properties. Cakebread & Walton products originally were published by the British gaming company Cubicle 7 until they started self publishing in 2013.

== Games ==
=== Role-playing games ===
Cakebread & Walton designs, develops and publishes the following role-playing games:

- Clockwork & Chivalry (Role-playing game set during the 17th century 'Alternate History' English Civil War. The first edition uses the Mongoose RuneQuest II rules. The second edition uses the Renaissance rules system published by Cakebread & Walton itself.)
- Renaissance Deluxe (A D100 Open Games Licence generic rules system. A free Renaissance SRD PDF is also available.)
- Dark Streets (RPG) (A role-playing mystery/horror game set in the 18th century. Uses the Renaissance rules system.)
- Pirates & Dragons (A fantasy role-playing game. Uses the Renaissance rules system.)
- Abney Park's Airship Pirates (A licensed Steampunk RPG, based on the songs of Robert Brown (musician) and Abney Park (band).)
- One-Dice (A D6 "Basic" role-playing game system with a large number of setting books.)
- Winter of the World (based on Michael Scott Rohan's fantasy novel series of the same name.)

=== Other game products ===
Cakebread & Walton also designs, develops and publishes the following:

- Flintlock & Steel (A series of adventures, source material and maps for their game systems.)

=== Novels ===
Cakebread and Walton have also released the following novels:

- The Alchemist's Revenge (set in the world of Clockwork & Chivalry)
- The Morecambe Medium (a humorous Victorian mystery/crime pastiche set in the seaside town of Morecambe, Lancashire)

== Awards ==
Cakebread and Walton won the UK Games Expo Best RPG award in 2012 and an Origins Award Nomination for Abney Park's Airship Pirates.

== Notable events ==
- June 2009, Cakebread & Walton was formed
