= Henry Brewis =

- Born: 1932
- Died: 2000 (aged 67–68)
- Area: Cartoonist

Henry Brewis (1932–2000) was a Northumberland born farmer, who developed his artistic talents into a successful side-line as a writer of tales, poems, artist, cartoonist and illustrator.

Henry Brewis was born near Alnwick, Northumberland in 1932. He was one of the old style farmers, locally well known, and spent much of his life farming a mixed arable and livestock business at Hartburn, near Morpeth, Northumberland.

He began his artistic work of drawings, sketches, cartoons etc. in the 1970s and these together with his writings became very popular, and featured regularly in the farming magazines, particularly the West Cumberland Farmers Journal, regional NFU journals and Livestock Farming. His book, Funnywayt'mekalivin' was a great success at the 1983 Smithfield Show with Henry Brewis in great demand to sign copies of the book.

He eventually sold his property on a lease-back arrangement so that he could spend more time on his side-line which by now had developed into a not so small local industry with the addition of greetings cards, decorated beer mugs and Tee shirts etc., audio tapes and prints of his cartoons. He had by this time even converted a byre into a studio. Henry Brewis died in 2000 leaving three children and two grandchildren.

== Works ==
=== Books ===
- Chewing the Cud – The sheep are on the road again, the cows are in the corn, the bank is on the telephone, the pigs are on the lawn. Etc
- Clarts and Calamities – A fictional year in the life of a bloke who'll never drive a Porsche, seldom wear a tie, and doesn’t commute to work, because he's there already
- Country Dance – A wryly humorous fable of the changes one traditional farm and village underwent as farming declined in the 1990s
- Don’t laugh till he’s out of sight – A selection of stories, poems and cartoons from the early 1980s
- Funnywayt’mekalivin – A book from 1983, containing 130 cartoons on timeless subjects
- Last Round-Up – When life has calmed down a bit... time to reflect and occasionally see the daftness of it all
- Goodbye Clartiehole
- Harvey and the Handy Lads
- Night Shift
- A Stroll in the Country
- Little Bit O'Nonsense About Sheep – A fresh look at the mule yow

=== Audio ===
- Rural Stew and Country Casserole – CD1 – Amusing stories and verse written and narrated by Brewis himself
- Shepherd's Pie – CD2 – Yet amusing stories and verse written and narrated by Brewis
- Second Helping – CD3 – Yet more stories, first released in the 1980s

He also illustrated several books for other authors including Robert Allen’s Canny Bit Verse.

== See also ==
- Geordie dialect words
- Robert Allen (poet)
