= Nathan Cobb Cottage =

Historic nineteenth-century cottage in Florida, U.S.

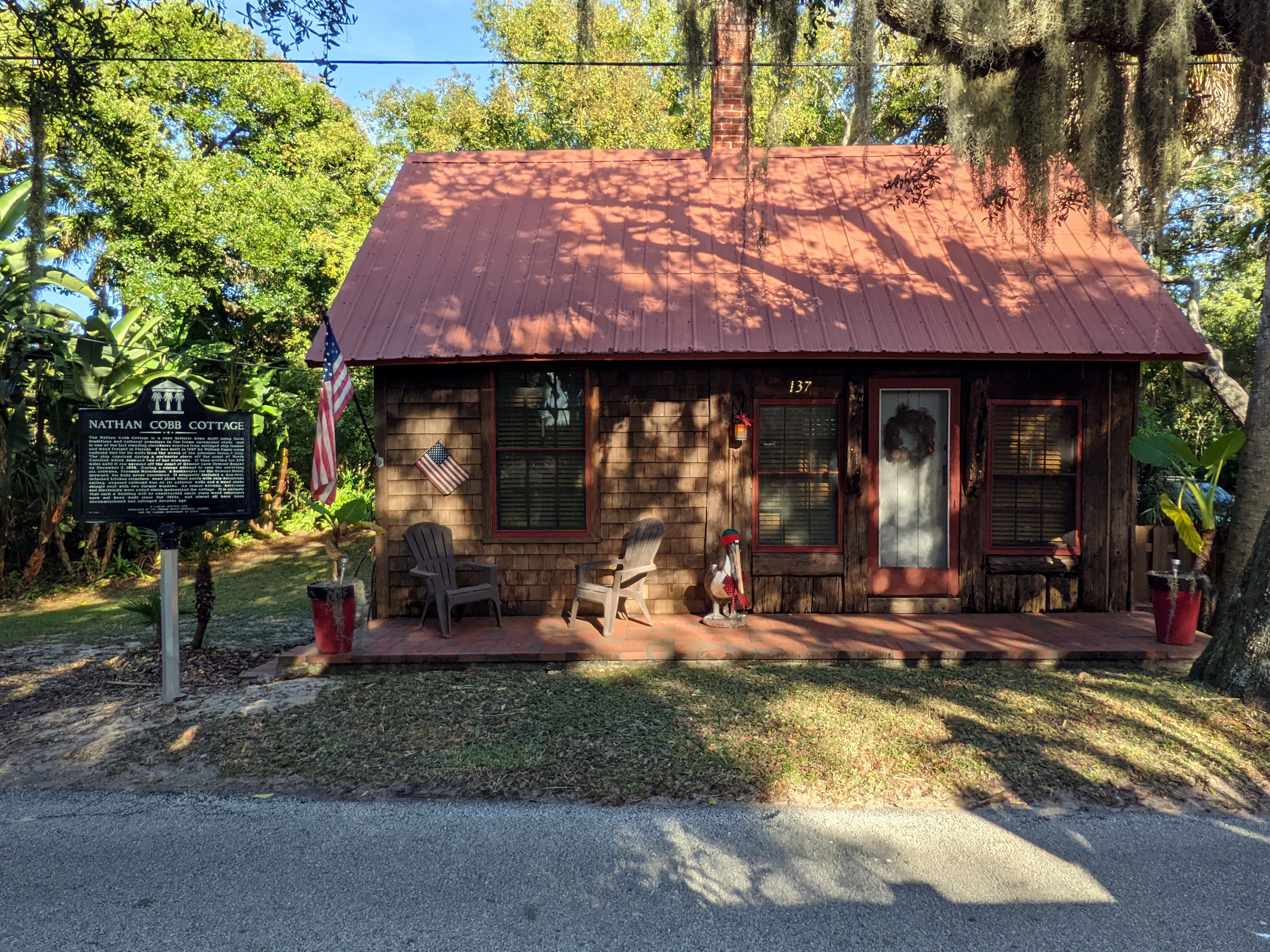
- Nathan Cobb Cottage - full front view with the Florida Historic Marker – photograph ca. 2021.

- Location within Florida Location within the United States

General information
- Type: Residential: Cottage
- Architectural style: Vernacular architectural style
- Location: Ormond Beach, Florida, 137 Orchard Lane
- Coordinates: 29°17′34″N 81°02′54″W
- Completed: 1897
- Renovated: 2014
- Owner: Ormond Beach Historical Society

Technical details
- Floor area: 457 square feet (42 m^{2})

Design and construction
- Architect: William Fagen
- Awards: Florida Heritage Landmark

The Nathan Cobb Cottage at 137 Orchand Lane in Ormond Beach, Florida, United States, is a half story residential structure that was constructed in 1897 from salvaged cargo and wood parts from the shipwreck of the Nathan F. Cobb schooner. A local man named William Fagen built the cottage in the vernacular architectural style using salvaged cargo and wood parts including railroad ties, flooring, balustrades and stairs.

== Nathan F. Cobb shipwreck ==
On December 1, 1896, the Nathan F. Cobb schooner was heavily damaged by a nor’easter storm off the coast of North Carolina and lost two crewmen. The ship then drifted for about four days until it ran aground on a sandbar off the coast of Ormond (now Ormond Beach). While attempting to rescue the six surviving crewmen a local Ormond Hotel employee named Freeman Waterhouse drowned. The six crewmen were eventually rescued, however, the ship never sailed again and remained marooned off the coast of Ormond. Its cargo and most of its wooden parts were salvaged. Now more than 120 years later, some remnants of the ship’s hull are occasionally visible after ocean waves disturb the area’s sandbars.

== Original configuration ==
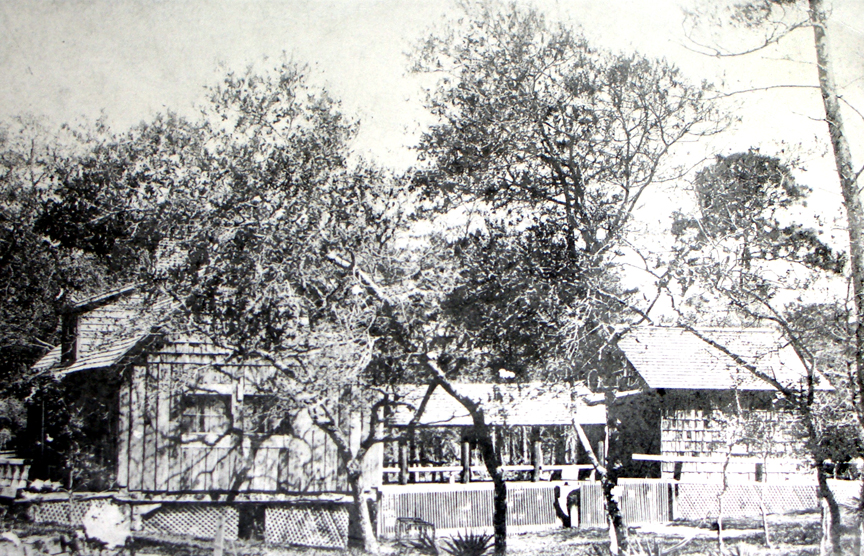
Nathan Cobb Cottage originally included an outer kitchen structure and dog-trot – photograph ca. 1900.

Originally, the Nathan Cobb Cottage included a wood outer kitchen structure that was connected to the cottage by a dog-trot (breezeway). All of these structures were built from pieces of salvaged wood from the Nathan F. Cobb schooner. The wood outer kitchen structure and dog-trot were removed in the 1920s most likely due to wood rot. The roof originally had wood shake shingles and a gable dormer window, however, they were removed and replaced with a composite shingle roof around 1965. The brick chimney and fireplace are original. The interior originally had two bedrooms on the top half story level and heart pine floor boards extended the length of the cottage. The south bedroom was removed in 1955, which created a vaulted ceiling above the living room.

The front of the cottage originally featured a full length wood deck porch that was built from pieces of the ship’s sole (floor). Salvaged pieces of ship balustrades served as railings for the porch. In the 1940s, the porch was removed due to wood rot and a portion of it around the front door was replaced with bricks. In the 1990s, a full length brick porch was installed. Around 1955, an eight-foot section of the south side of the cottage structure was removed most likely due to wood rot. A section of the ship's quarter board that has the Nathan F. Cobb name carved into it was originally located on the exterior of the south wall, but was moved inside and hung on the south side wall of the living room.

== Alterations and current configuration ==
After standing for more than 120 years the cottage has undergone several alterations. The cottage currently stands on brick pier supports and has a rectangular floor plan that measures 23’ by 17’. The kitchen projects from the northeastern side and measures 6’ by 11’, which makes the structure 457 square feet. The original exterior walls are constructed from vertically positioned railroad ties, but are now mostly covered with cedar shake siding. The dining room includes a small closet and the original wood staircase that leads to the bedroom on the upper half story. A bathroom was added on to the east side of the dining room in 1955, and in 2014 it was upgraded with a modern shower, toilet and sink. The 6’ by 11’ kitchen is actually a part of the original dog-trot, and in 2014 it was upgraded with a modern sink, wood pine flooring and new appliances. An exterior wood porch deck measuring 12’ by 12’ was built onto the rear of the cottage in 2014.

== Florida Heritage Landmark ==
In May 2021, the Florida Bureau of Historic Preservation approved a Florida Historical Marker for the Nathan Cobb Cottage, which also signifies that it is a Florida Heritage Landmark. The marker was installed in front of the cottage on November 17, 2021. The Florida Historical Marker reads:

The Nathan Cobb Cottage is a rare historic home built using local traditions and cultural practices in the frame vernacular style, and is one of the last standing structures erected from salvaged ship lumber and wood freight in Florida. It was built in 1897 by William Fagen using railroad ties for its walls from the wreck of the schooner Nathan F. Cobb. The ship capsized during a nor’easter storm off the coast of North Carolina which drowned two of her crewmen. It then drifted for 375 miles until it ran aground off the coast of Ormond (now Ormond Beach) on December 5, 1896. During a rescue attempt to save the surviving six crewmen, Freeman Waterhouse, a bookkeeper for the Ormond Hotel, drowned, his body never recovered. It originally included a dog-trot, detached kitchen structure, wood plank front porch with ship balustrade railing, exposed railroad ties on its exterior walls and a wood shake shingle roof with two dormer windows. An indoor kitchen, bathroom and electricity were added which modernized the cottage. It is unlikely that such a building will be constructed again since wood schooners have not been built since the 1920s, and almost all have been decommissioned and salvaged decades ago.

A FLORIDA HERITAGE SITE
SPONSORED BY THE ORMOND BEACH HISTORICAL SOCIETY,
AND THE FLORIDA DEPARTMENT OF STATE
2021

== Legacy ==
The Nathan Cobb Cottage is one of Volusia County, Florida's most iconic surviving historic landmarks, and stands as an excellent example of vernacular craftsmanship from the late nineteenth century. It is one of the last standing buildings in Florida that was constructed from salvaged schooner ship wood parts and cargo.

Images of the Nathan Cobb Cottage
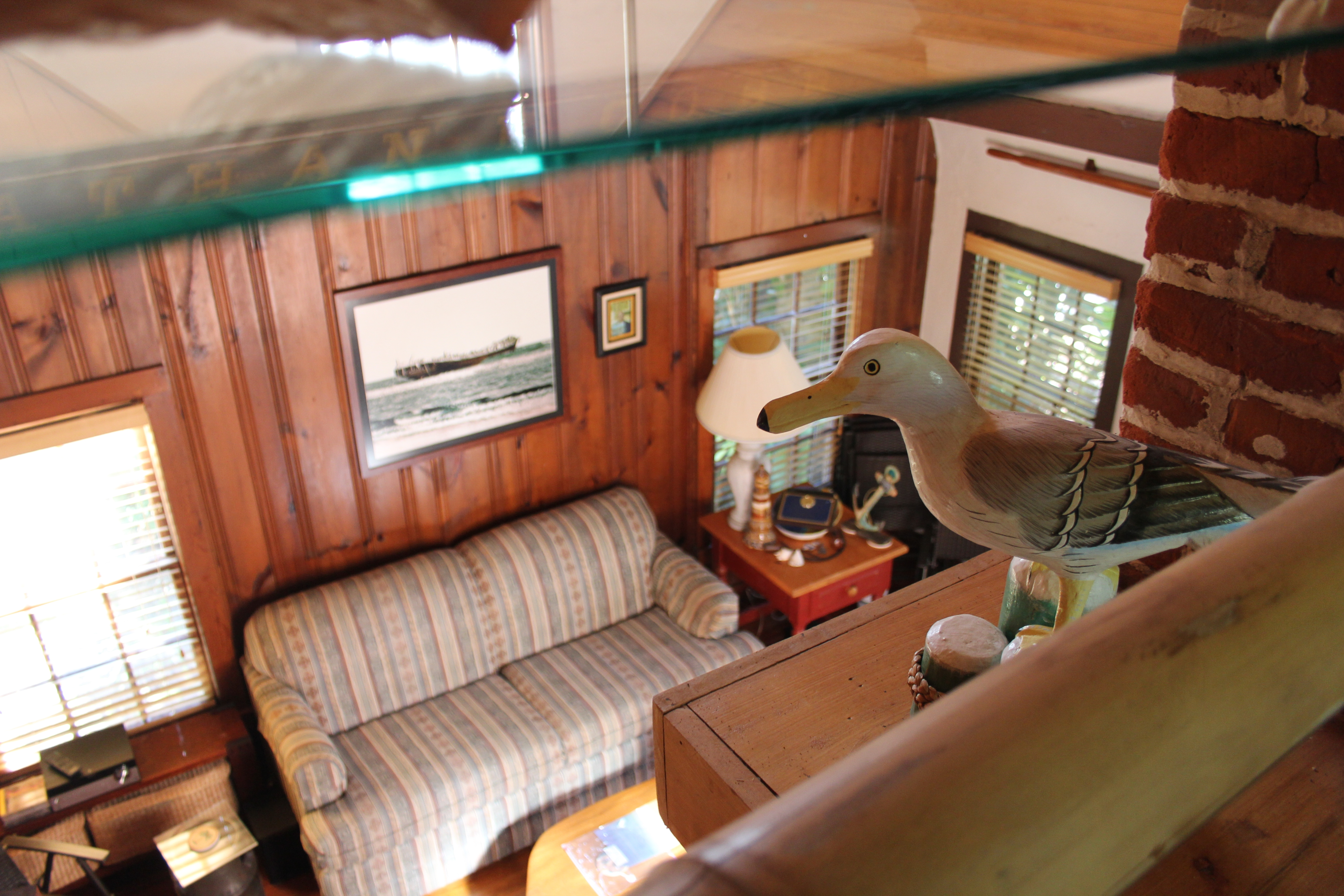
Nathan Cobb Cottage - Interior 2nd Floor Loft Looking Down to Living Room - photograph ca. 2021.

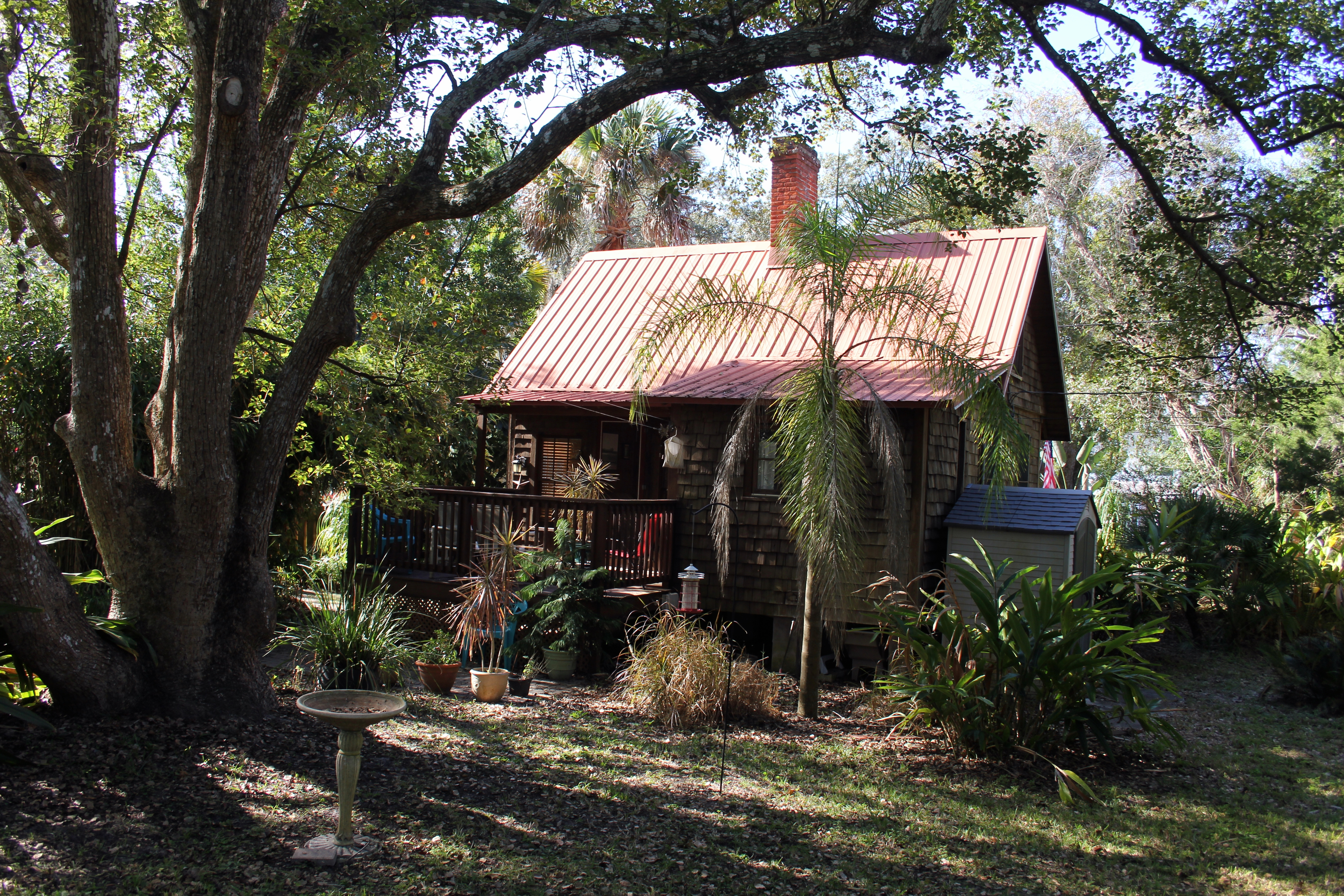
Nathan Cobb Cottage - Exterior Northeast Side view - photograph ca. 2021.

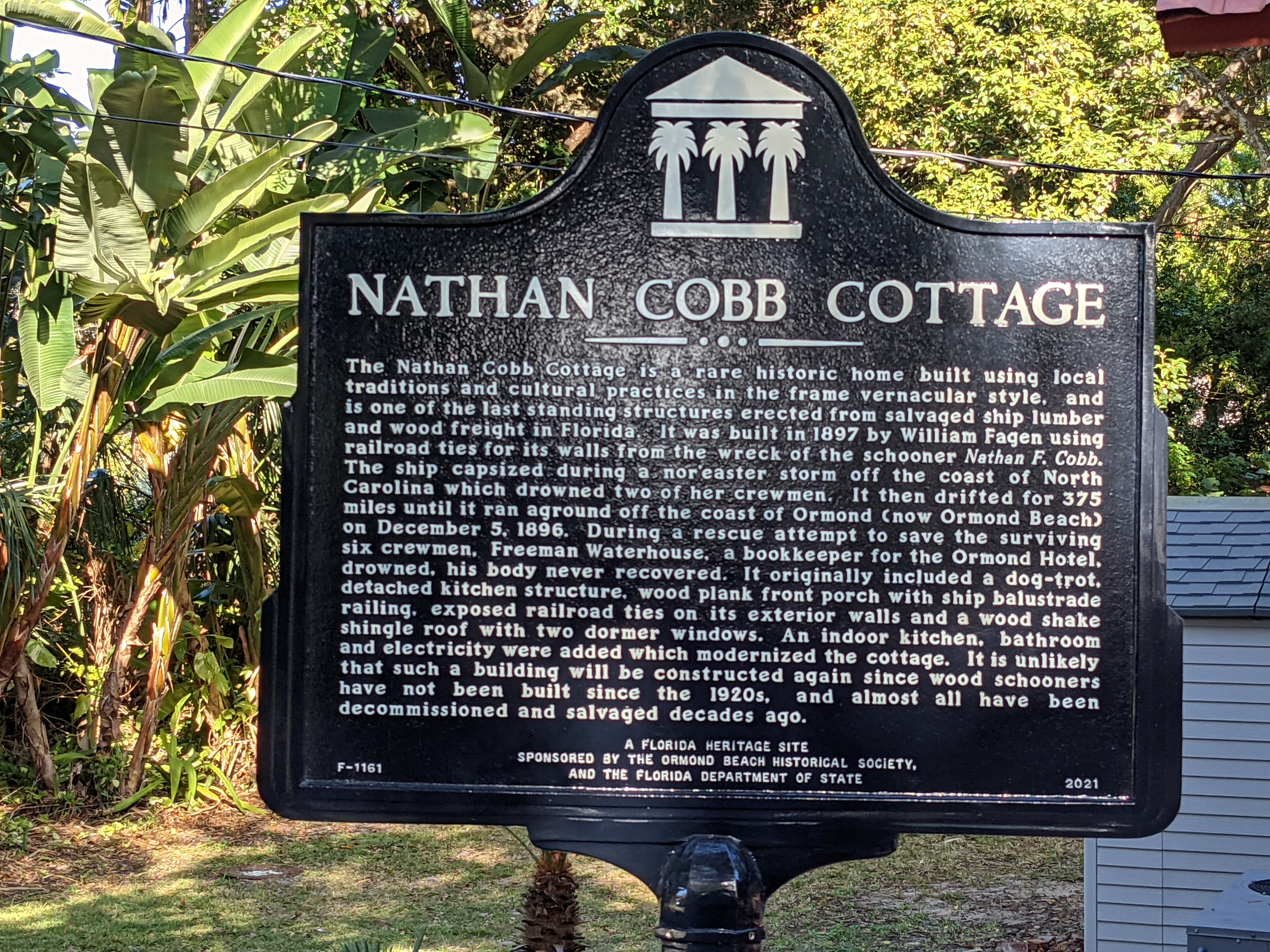
Nathan Cobb Cottage – Florida Historic Marker view – photograph ca. 2021.

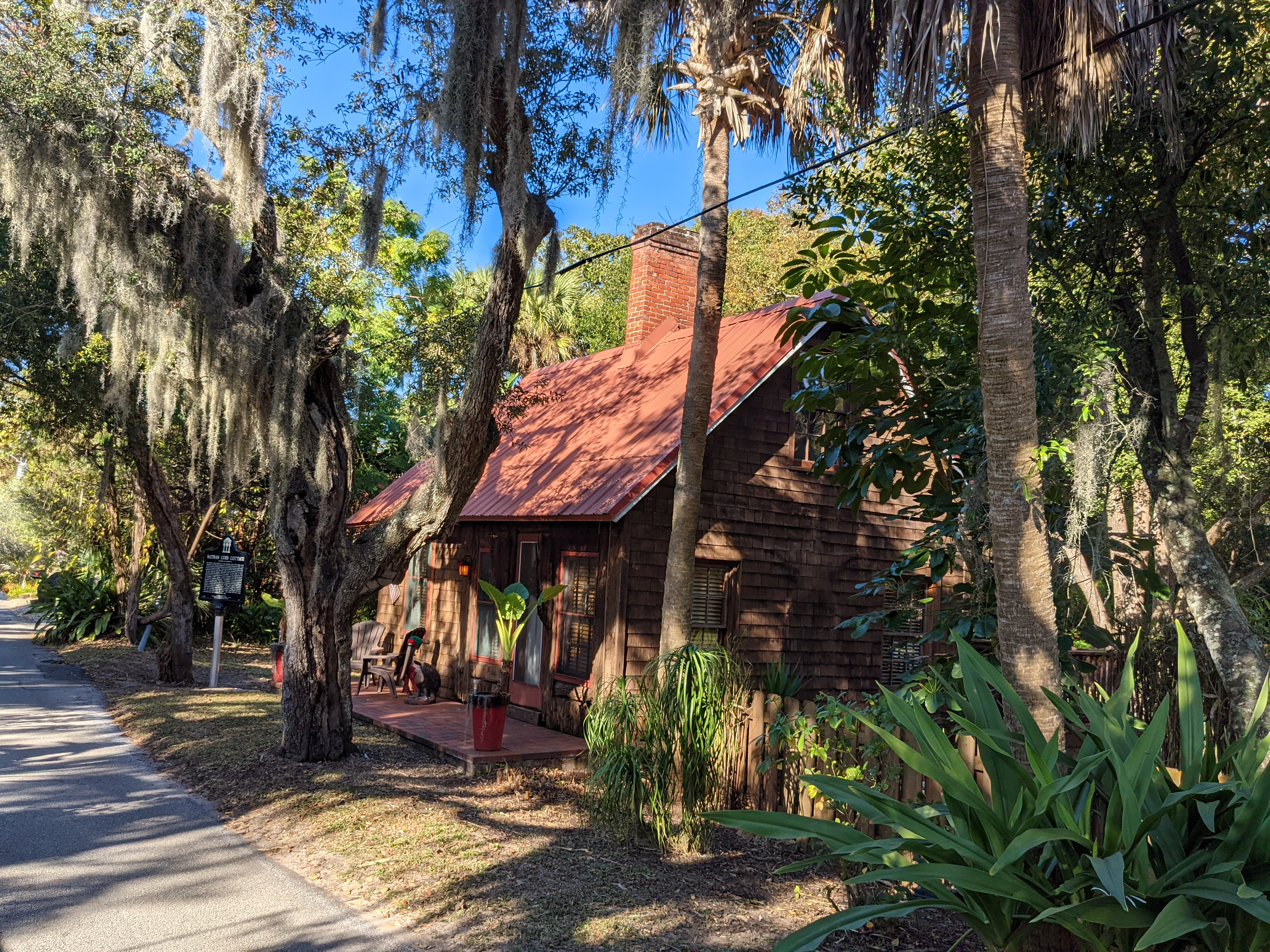
Nathan Cobb Cottage – Southwest Front View – photograph ca. 2021.
