= Peter Cakebread =

British game designer

- Occupation: Game designer

Peter Cakebread is a game designer who has worked primarily on role-playing games.

== Career ==
Peter Cakebread formed the game company Cakebread & Walton with Ken Walton. They were licensees for the RuneQuest II system published by Mongoose Publishing which they were able to use to design the Clockwork & Chivalry alternate history for the English Civil War. Cakebread has worked on numerous games and systems including Clockwork & Chivalry, Airship Pirates, Dark Streets, the Renaissance d100 rules, Pirates & Dragons and the popular One Dice rules.

Cakebread has also written the novel The Alchemist's Revenge (2013), and was the lead author of the mystery novel The Morecambe Medium (2014).
