= From Dreams or Angels =

From Dreams Or Angels

Studio album by Abney Park
- Released: 2001
- Genre: Industrial rock; gothic rock
- Label: Abney Park

Abney Park chronology
Cemetery Number 1 (2000)	From Dreams Or Angels (2001)	Taxidermy (2005)

From Dreams or Angels is the fourth studio album by Abney Park, released in 2001.

== Track listing ==
All information from band's website.

1. "The Root of All Evil" - 4:07
2. "Tiny Monster" - 2:58
3. "Holy War" - 4:24
4. "Kine" - 4:30
5. "Breathe" - 3:52
6. "Hush" - 3:14
7. "Thorns & Brambles" - 3:42
8. "Child King" - 5:02
9. "The Box" - 2:59
10. "Twisted & Broken" - 3:58
11. "Breathe (acoustic)" - 3:42

== Twisted & Broken ==
A companion remix album, Twisted & Broken, was released in 2003.

Track listing

1. "Holy War (remix by Gossamer)"
2. "The Wake (remix by the Mercy Cage)"
3. "Tiny Monster (cover by Xanther)"
4. "Vengeance (remix by Sinforosa)"
5. "The Wake (remix by Hanging Man)"
6. "Hush (remix by Falling You)"
7. "Black Day (cover by Dark Aeons)"
8. "Twisted & Broken (remix by Lethargic Dance)"
9. "Vengeance (remix by Mephisto Walz)"

== Personnel ==
- Robert Brown – vocals
- Kristina Erickson – keyboards
- Josh Goering – guitar
- Rob Hazelton – additional guitar
- Robert Gardunia – bass
- Madame Archel – flute, backing vocals
