= Sucking the monkey =

Drinking practice in the Royal Navy

In the Royal Navy, sucking the monkey, bleeding the monkey, or tapping the admiral was the practice of sucking liquor from a cask through a straw. This usually involved making a small hole with a gimlet in a keg or barrel and using a straw to suck out the contents. It was known for people to die from alcohol poisoning by this practice.

== Tapping the Admiral ==
The British Vice-admiral Horatio Nelson was killed at the Battle of Trafalgar by French gunfire while topside his ship, HMS Victory. Following the battle, Nelson's corpse was preserved in a cask of brandy or rum and transported back to England. Due to damage sustained in the battle, Victory first went to Gibraltar for repairs. There the cask was drained and replaced with fortified wine. Upon being inspected in Gibraltar, however, the story goes that the cask was opened and found to be empty of alcohol. The pickled body was removed and, upon inspection, it was discovered that the sailors had drilled a hole in the bottom of the cask and drunk all the alcohol within. Thus, this tale serves as a basis for the term Nelson's blood being used to describe brandy and rum.

The Sunderland Daily Echo referred to "local naval hero" John Waterhouse as "one of those who 'tapped the Admiral' when he was on board Nelson's ship, an act which caused permanent injury to his hand when it was crushed in the process of tipping the cask".

The details of the story are disputed, as many historians claim the cask contained French brandy, whilst others claim instead the term originated from a toast to Admiral Nelson. Variations of the story, involving different notable corpses, and different spirits, have been in circulation for many years. The official record states merely that the body was placed in "refined spirits" and does not go into further detail.

The use of the term tapping the Admiral to mean secretly drinking from a barrel of rum or other spirit, pre-dates the Admiral Nelson story. The term appeared in a Caledonian Mercury article, in 1790 and was referred to as "still a favourite practical joke with the jolly tars", suggesting it was already a well-established euphemistic term for secretly drinking from the Navy's stores.

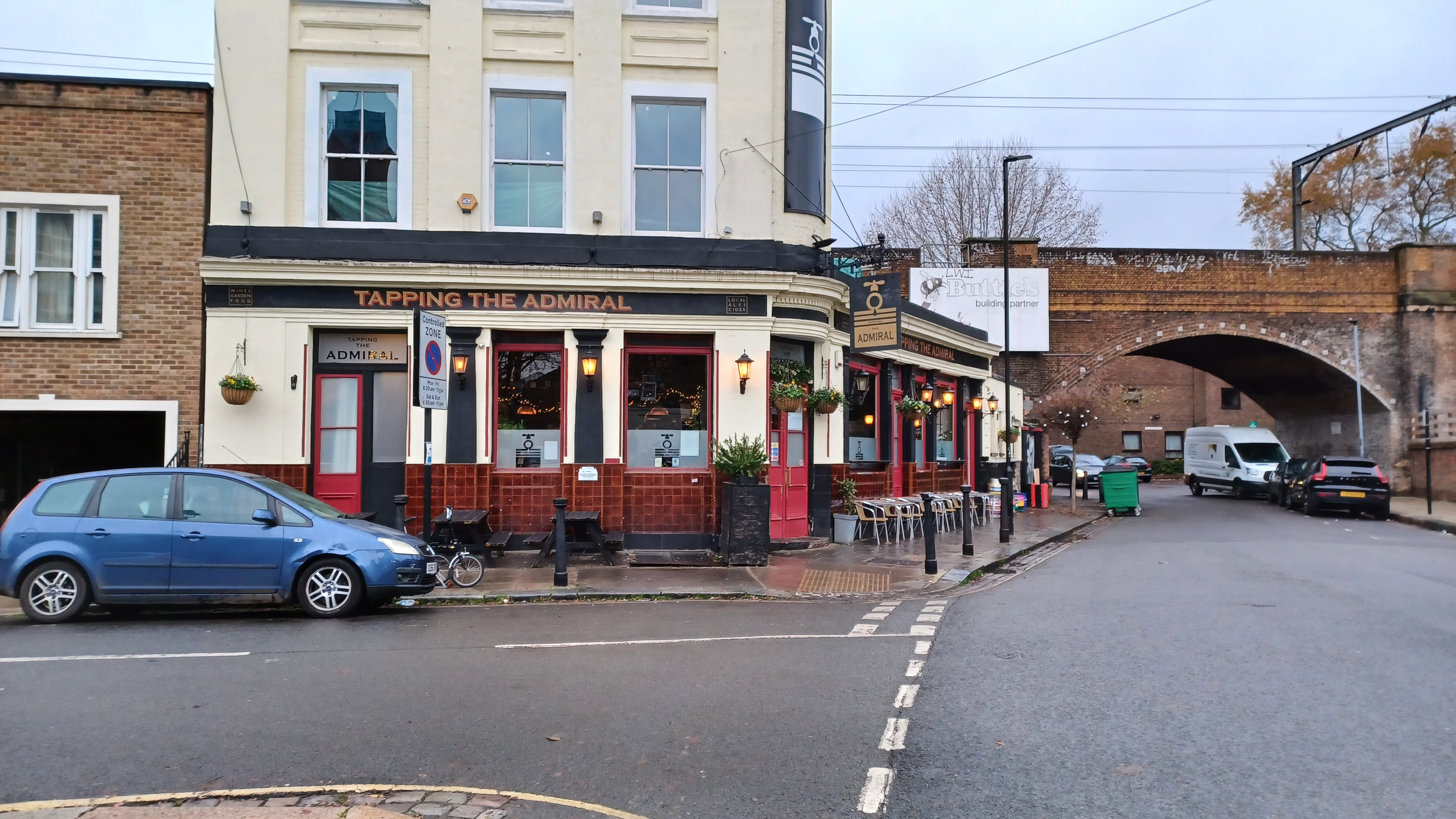
Tapping the Admiral, Kentish Town, London

In Kentish Town, north London, the "Tapping the Admiral" pub is named after the tale. It was voted Pub of the Year by the north London branch of CAMRA in 2013.
