= Dark Streets (RPG) =

Tabletop role-playing game

- Dark Streets - Front cover
- Designers: Peter Cakebread and Ken Walton
- Publishers: Cakebread & Walton
- Publication: 2012
- Genres: Historical role-playing game, Horror, Cthulhu Mythos
- Systems: Renaissance Deluxe D100

Dark Streets is an investigative, horror role-playing game written by Peter Cakebread and Ken Walton and published by Cakebread & Walton.

== Overview ==
Much of the game usually focuses on investigation and deduction but combat can and does play a big part in it. The game requires the use of the Renaissance Deluxe rulebook.

From the back of the book :

"The Adventures of the Bow Street Runners in their Struggle Against the Minions of the Cthulhu Mythos

London, 1749: A city of vice, crime and misery. Gangs of ruffians rule the streets, unopposed. Brothels proliferate. Child-beggars starve in filthy gutters. Corrupt night-watchmen and thief-takers turn a blind eye to wrongdoing. And dark creatures lurk in back alleys, called from beyond by the desperate with nothing left to lose.

But there is a new force on the streets of London; for the author and magistrate Henry Fielding has teamed up with his brother John to form the city’s first police force – the Bow Street Runners. The Fieldings have persuaded parliament to fund their crime-fighting endeavour, but they know that there is something behind the vice – for John Fielding’s blind eyes can see things that others cannot – things that man was not meant to know."

== Game mechanics ==
The game uses the Renaissance Deluxe which is an Open Games Licence rules system, created by Cakebread & Walton with task rolls based on a percentile or D100 roll

== Releases ==
- Dark Streets: Print and pdf - Core rules
- Hellfire: Print and pdf - Adventure
- The Case of the Missing Professor: pdf - Adventure
- Tomes of Blasphemous Knowledge: pdf - Source material
- Guardians of Blasphemous Knowledge: pdf - Source material
