= Teesside Fettlers =

English folk music band

The Teesside Fettlers are one of the north east of England's longest running and most successful folk bands. They were first formed in the early 1960s and have seen many changes in their line up since. A considerable number of the cream of the North East's folk talent has at one time played with The Teesside Fettlers, including John Chaulkie White. Ken Crawford Vin Garbutt, Ron Angel, Richard Grainger, Bob Skingle and Adrian Beadnell. The band have performed across the UK, on the international circuit at festivals, concerts and on radio and television. They sing mainly about Teesside, North Yorkshire and Durham, telling the story of the development of the region, its industrial heritage and the beautiful countryside that surrounds it. A regular request for the group is to provide Ceilidh evenings at which their resident caller, Ron Marshall joins them.

Frontman for the band is Stewart McFarlane MBE who provides lead vocals and percussion (including playing spoons and bones for ceilidhs). He is joined by Alan Helm playing accordion, guitar and electric bass and Stan Gee on banjo, fiddle and guitar.

== Heritage ==
A fettler is an old craft from the iron and steel industry that grew in the north east of England. His job was to remove the excess material from castings, by "fettling" them. To fettle is to put right, fix: "I'll fettle you". The word remains in common use in the North East and is synonymous in the area with the group.

In 2000, the band received National Lottery funding to produce a CD compilation of their music, to be used in schools and colleges as part of an education programme.

BBC Television have shown considerable interest in the band over the years, making a 30-minute documentary in 1976,Travelling the Tees, featuring the band making a musical journey down the River Tees from Cauldron Snout to Teesmouth.

The band were invited twice by Sir Harry Secombe to appear on ITV's Highway. On the first occasion, they crossed the Transporter Bridge in a charabanc performing "Ring of Iron". In the second, they were filmed at Whitby harbour singing "Cædmon" about an Anglo Saxon poet and "The Whitby Whaler", a song written by Richard Grainger, and recorded by the band on their album Ring of Iron.

The band were regular performers at folk music festivals, making several unprecedented repeat appearances at Sidmouth and the Rose of Tralee.

== The band's music ==
The band play a mix of traditional and locally written songs, together with their comprehensive ceilidh set. Many of their contemporary songs have been written by members of the band, or specifically for the band by local songwriters. They favour songs which describe the history of the area; not just the beautiful rolling countryside, but also about the pollution and industrial impact.

Well known, and often requested songs include "The Hartlepool Monkey" written by Alan Wilkinson, an early member of the band.

Their album Travelling the Tees contains their song "The Procession", an imaginary account of a Royal visit to open a Hospital Ward in Middlesbrough. Written by Graeme Miles, it paints a humorous picture of life in the rough end of town. "Ring of Iron" (Miles), "Chemical Workers Song" (Angel) and "Blue Sunset" (Miles), describe the pollution and hard working conditions of local industries. "Beauty and the Beast" and "I Will Stay" (both Skingle) describe the contrast between the hard industrial development of Teesside and the open moorland less than 20 minutes by car. "The Blackleg Miner" (traditional) foretells the likely fate of those who would break strikes at the coal mines in Northumberland. "The Boars Head Carol" (traditional) is a powerful unaccompanied song.
