= The Death of Tragedy (Abney Park album) =

Studio album by Abney Park
- Released: 2005
- Genre: Dark wave; industrial rock; gothic rock
- Label: Abney Park

Abney Park chronology
Taxidermy (2005)	The Death of Tragedy (2005)	Lost Horizons (2008)

The Death Of Tragedy is the fifth studio album by steampunk band Abney Park. The artwork is a shot of the Red Fort, where the singer and songwriter Robert Brown lived when he was a kid.

== Track listing ==
1. "Stigmata Martyr"
2. "The Wrong Side"
3. "Dear Ophelia"
4. "Witch Cult"
5. "Sacrilege"
6. "All The Myths Are True"
7. "Death Of The Hero"
8. "Love"
9. "Downtrodden"
10. "False Prophecy"

== Credits ==
- Robert Brown - Songs, vocals, Dumbek
- Kristina Erickson - Keyboards
- Traci Nemeth - Vocals
- Rob Hazelton - Guitar
- Krysztof Nemeth - Bass

=== Guest artists ===
- Nathen Rollins - Violin
- Lyssa Browne - Reporter
- Bill Owens - Anchorman
