= Don't Forget Your Old Shipmate =

Traditional naval song

"Don't Forget Your Old Shipmate" (Roud V23285) is a traditional naval song that has been sung by British Royal Navy sailors since the 19th century.

== Versions ==
=== First version ===
The song was written by Richard Creagh Saunders (1809–1886), who enlisted in the navy as a Schoolmaster on the 11th of July, 1839. It was recorded in Charles Harding Firth's Naval Songs and Ballads (1908) in a slightly different form from the one popularized in cinema, where its opening verse has been omitted, and with quatrain stanzas instead of couplets.

The first version opens with the following quatrain:

We're the boys that fear no noise,
Whilst the thundering cannons roar,
And long we've toiled on the rolling wave,
And now we're safe on shore.
Folderol, etc.

The rest of the song as presented by Firth does not differ substantially from the popular version presented below, but a few lines are inverted or have slight alterations to word order.

=== Popular Master and Commander version ===
The version sung in the film was arranged in 1978 by Jim Mageean from his album 'Of Ships... and Men.' The song is sung in the wardroom scene of Master and Commander: The Far Side of the World, and is still sung aboard surface combatant ships of the Royal Navy.

Safe and sound at home again, let the waters roar, Jack.
Safe and sound at home again, let the waters roar, Jack.

Chorus
Long we've tossed on the rolling main, now we're safe ashore, Jack.
Don't forget yer old shipmate, faldee raldee raldee raldee rye-eye-doe!

Since we sailed from Plymouth Sound, four years gone, or nigh, Jack.
Was there ever chummies, now, such as you and I, Jack?

Long we've tossed on the rolling main, now we're safe ashore, Jack.
Don't forget yer old shipmate, faldee raldee raldee raldee rye-eye-doe!

We have worked the self-same gun, quarterdeck division.
Sponger I and loader you, through the whole commission.

Long we've tossed on the rolling main, now we're safe ashore, Jack.
Don't forget yer old shipmate, faldee raldee raldee raldee rye-eye-doe!

Oftentimes have we laid out, toil nor danger fearing,
Tugging out the flapping sail to the weather earing.

Long we've tossed on the rolling main, now we're safe ashore, Jack.
Don't forget yer old shipmate, faldee raldee raldee raldee rye-eye-doe!

When the middle watch was on, and the time went slow, boy,
Who could choose a rousing stave, who like Jack or Joe, boy?

Long we've tossed on the rolling main, now we're safe ashore, Jack.
Don't forget yer old shipmate, faldee raldee raldee raldee rye-eye-doe!

There she swings, an empty hulk, not a soul below now.
Number seven starboard mess misses Jack and Joe now.

Long we've tossed on the rolling main, now we're safe ashore, Jack.
Don't forget yer old shipmate, faldee raldee raldee raldee rye-eye-doe!

But the best of friends must part, fair or foul the weather.
Hand yer flipper for a shake, now a drink together.

Long we've tossed on the rolling main, now we're safe ashore, Jack.
Don't forget yer old shipmate, faldee raldee raldee raldee rye-eye-doe!
