= Abney Park (band) =

American rock band

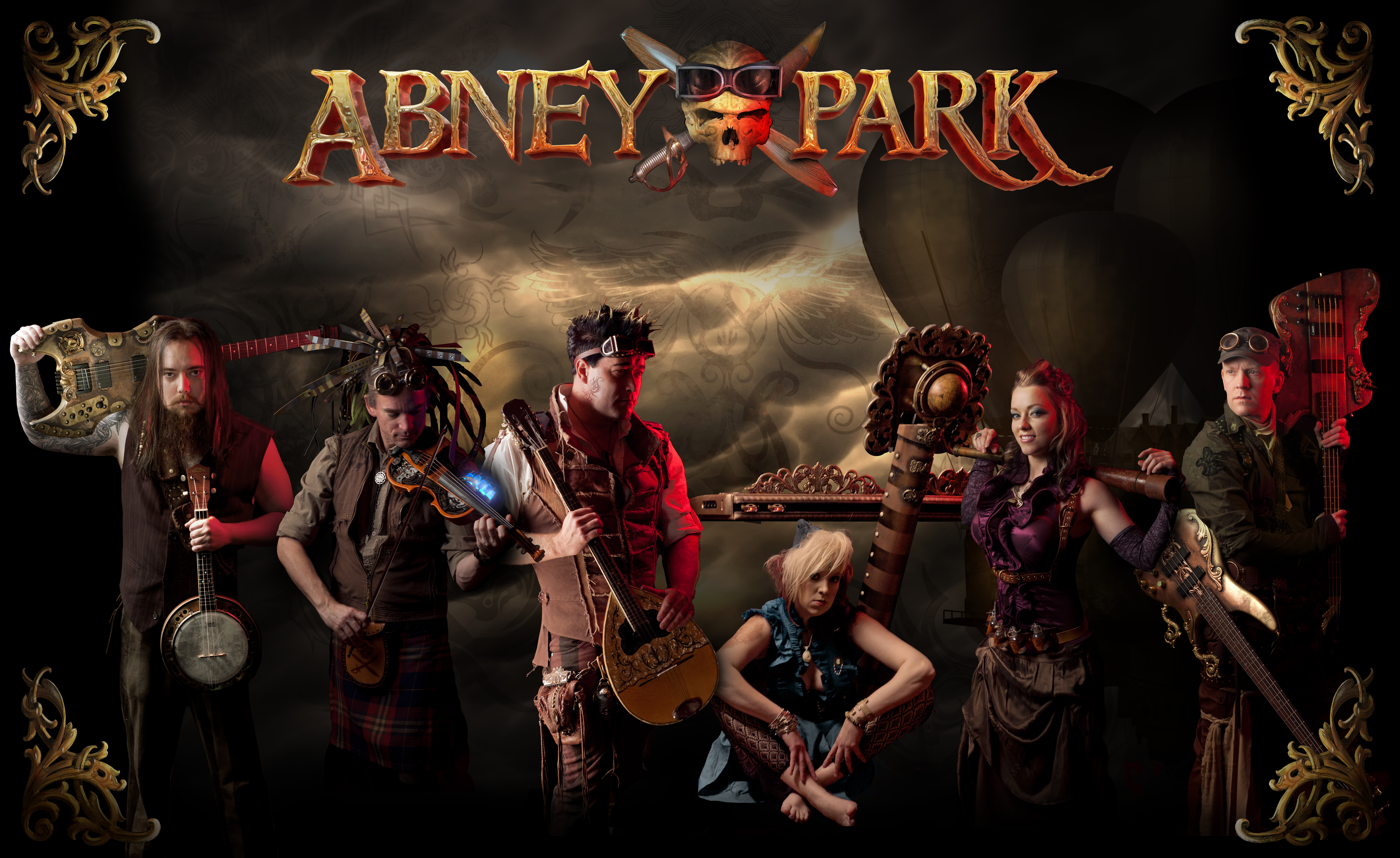

Background information
- Origin: Seattle, United States
- Genres: Industrial rock; folk rock; folktronica; gothic rock (early)
- Years active: 1997–present
- Label: None (self-produced)
- Members: Robert Brown (Vocals, Darbuka, Diatonic button accordion, harmonica, bouzouki, bağlama, ukulele); Kristina Erickson (keyboards, Piano); Skye Warden (Guitar); Aleida Gehrel (viola); Carey Rayburn (Trumpet, ukulele, penny whistle, trombone, didgeridoo)
- Past members: Josh Goering; Nicolette Andres; Titus Munteanu; Daniel Cederman; Jody Ellen; Nathaniel Johnstone; Alyssa Morrow; Traci Nemeth; Krysztof Nemeth; Robert Hazelton; Magdalene Veen; Jean-Paul Mayden; Finn von Claret; Madame Archel (Rachel Gilley); Robert Gardunia; Thomas Thompson; Henry Cheng; Suzanne Sweeney; Lee Tillman; Jennifer Savage; Mitchell Drury; Derek Brown
- Website: https://www.abneypark.com/

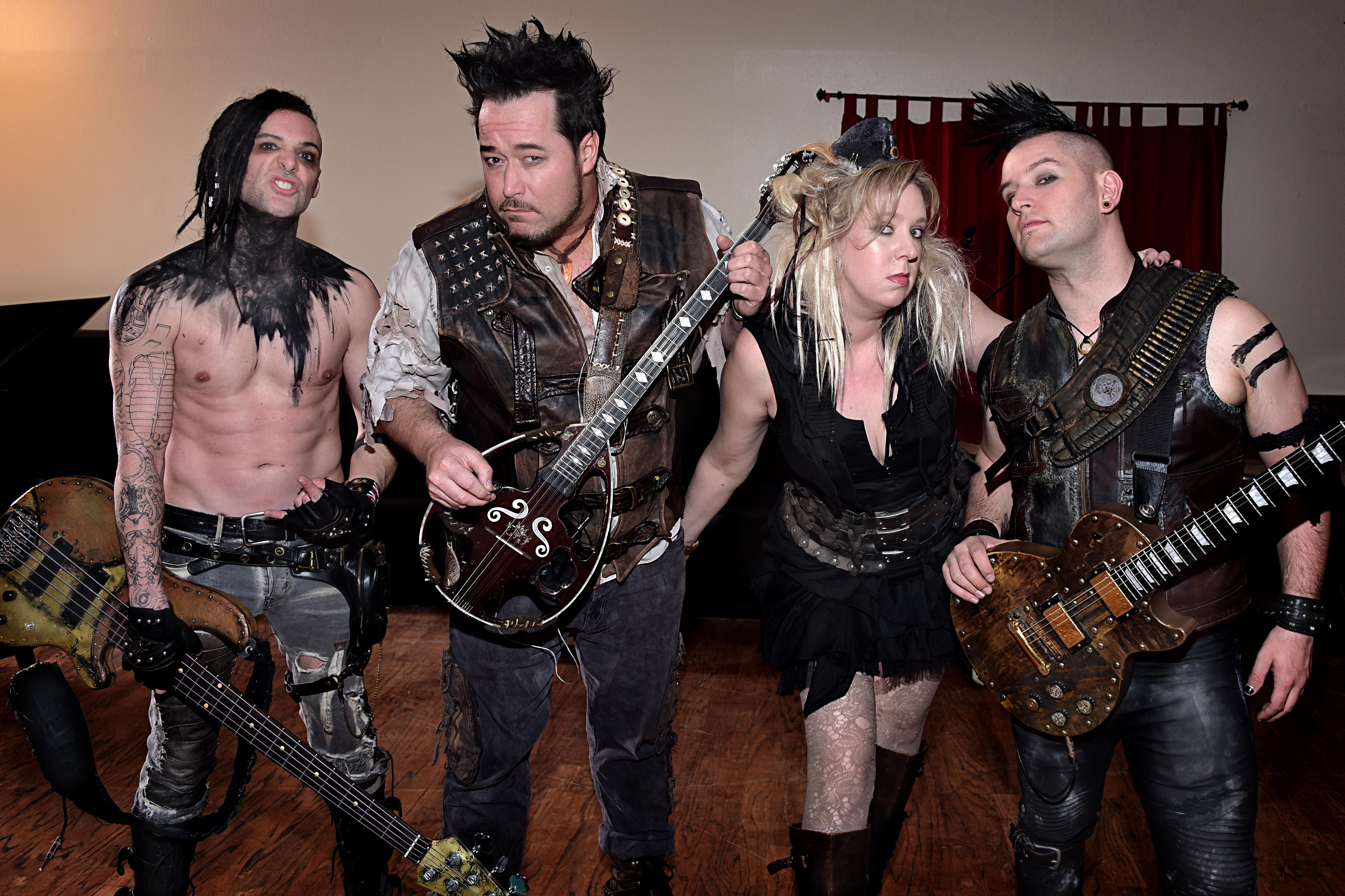
Abney Park Band in Torrance California on February 25, 2017

Abney Park is an American rock band based in Seattle. Formed in 1997, they have been called the "quintessential spokespeople for the steampunk subculture."

== History ==
=== Early days ===
Abney Park is the creative brainchild of Robert Brown, who formed the band in 1997 and continues to be the lead singer, principal songwriter, artistic director, and chief manager of the band. The band is named after an iconic Gothic cemetery, the Abney Park Cemetery in London where Robert Brown, the founder of the band, lived and studied for a period in 1988. Brown released the first full-length album, Abney Park, in 1998, and in 1999 released Return to the Fire. The band's third album, Cemetery Number 1, drew from their first two albums as well as introducing several new songs. These early albums pioneered steampunk themes prior to the band's adoption of the steampunk label with lyrics depicting clockwork boys and steam-powered dystopian cities (The Change Cage and Twisted and Broken).

Songs from their 2002 release From Dreams Or Angels, The Change Cage, Black Day and No Life, each reached number one on the industrial, darkwave and black metal music charts.

In 2005, the band released Taxidermy, which is a collection of new versions of songs from past albums, three live tracks, and two covers.

=== Becoming steampunk ===
In early 2005, Robert Brown transformed Abney Park from a largely goth industrial band into a steampunk band. As part of that transformation, fictional identities were created for the main performers; e.g., Robert Brown became known as Captain Robert. Since steampunk is largely derived from science fiction and fantasy literature, a fictional backstory was created to set a stage for their new music.

In the spring of 2008, they released Lost Horizons, their first wholly steampunk-themed album, and in 2009, the band released Æther Shanties, their tenth album. A recording of a live performance of their next album, The End of Days, can be found here. Their seventh studio album was released on October 15, 2010.

=== Popularity ===
Abney Park have been featured in major news media and interviewed by several genre magazines and websites, and have been highlighted on MTV and G4TV as primary examples of the steampunk musical scene.

Abney Park have performed at numerous festivals. They were the featured band at the first Steamcon in 2009 and have appeared there numerous times since. They have appeared three times at World Steam Expo, five times at Dragon*Con; also WGW, Utah Dark Arts, Bats Day, Convergence, Ravenwood Festival, Masque and Veil, Queen Mary Pyrate Daze, the Bay Area Maker Faire, and Wild Wild West Steampunk Convention. Internationally, they have made four appearances at Whitby Gothic Weekend in the UK, two appearances at Wave Gotik TReffen in Leipzig, Germany, and four at the Grand Canadian Steampunk Exposition in Ontario Canada. They have been in demand for shows in St Petersberg and Moscow, Russia, Spain, Australia, and the UK.

Their music has featured in many compilation CDs, including Gilded Age Records' An Age Remembered: A Steampunk and Neo-Victorian Mix, Cleopatra Records' The Unquiet Grave vol. III, Sepiachord's A Sepiachord Companion, BLC Productions' Annihilation and Seduction, Squish Me Down Records' Eighteen (Eighteen NW Bands Benefit CD)

Their music has also appeared in several movie soundtracks, including Insomnis Amour, Goth, and Lord of the Vampires. The Abney Park song Sleep Isabella was used in a scene in the HBO series True Blood, Season 5 Episode 4.

== Musical style ==
Abney Park combines techno rhythms with world and folk music. Their songs feature acoustic instrumentation from Turkish diatonic accordion, darbuka, baglama, bouzouki, which Robert Brown plays, as well as violin, keyboard, drums, electric guitar and bass guitar. Initially a goth band with pagan leanings, the band subsequently expanded their sound to include sea shanties, folk, tribal and Vaudeville. The band has described their music as a mix of Gypsy rock, EDM, electro swing, industrial dance and Western music.

Their lyrics explore steampunk themes. They avoid directly addressing political issues in their lyrics, with Brown stating, "I'll let the politicians handle politics. I'm just here to rock the house".

In 1998, the Tacoma-based counter culture magazine Pandemonium first labeled Abney Park a goth band, citing their electronic sound and Robert Brown's deep baritone voice. This label stuck, and influenced the band's musical and visual style, which culminated with their 2002 release From Dreams Or Angels. In 2006, the release of the album The Death of Tragedy marked the beginning of a major change for the band, as their music departed from their earlier goth/pagan sound to a more world and folk music-inspired sound. As Brown said on his live journal post March 13, 2005, "[We] seem to be a sort of specialized variation on steampunk, sort of a Victorian sci-fi adventurer, as if we just arrived by jet-powered zeppelin for a midnight dig just outside of Cairo in the 1900s. I'm excited because I feel like for the first time, our appearances are starting to capture the same level of imagination and exotic tones the music and lyrics always have."

According to The Wrath of Fate: Book 1 of The Airship Pirate Chronicles, by Brown, the band's plane collided with a time-travelling dirigible called HMS Ophelia, said to have been created by a Dr. Leguminous Calgori in a freak storm. The band commandeered the vessel, deciding to become airship pirates, and formed a new band from the surviving members of the crash. Much of their music since that time has been based around this fictional backstory. "The new, eclectic sound is attributed to the strange instruments and exotic musical influences lifted from the numerous locations and eras they have visited in the airship Ophelia, featuring "clockwork guitars, belly dancers, flintlock bassists, Middle-Eastern percussion, violent violin, and Tesla powered keyboards blazing in a post-apocalyptic, swashbuckling, Steampunk musical mayhem."

== Discography ==
Albums:

Welcome To The Park (1997)
| No. | Title | Length |
|---|---|---|
| 1. | "The Wake" |
| 2. | "No Life" |
| 3. | "Abney Park" |
| 4. | "Vengeance" |
| 5. | "Like You Should" |
| 6. | "Burn" |
| 7. | "Looking Back At You" |
| 8. | "Burn (Instrumental)" |

Abney Park (1998)
| No. | Title | Length |
|---|---|---|
| 1. | "The Wake" |
| 2. | "No Life" |
| 3. | "Abney Park" |
| 4. | "Vengeance" |
| 5. | "Like You Should" |
| 6. | "Looking Back At You" |
| 7. | "Burn" |
| 8. | "Burn (Instrumental)" |

Return To The Fire (1999)
| No. | Title | Length |
|---|---|---|
| 1. | "The Wake" |
| 2. | "Rebirth" |
| 3. | "The Only One" |
| 4. | "Vengeance" |
| 5. | "Black Day" |
| 6. | "Abney Park" |
| 7. | "No Life" |

Cemetery Number 1 (2000)
| No. | Title | Length |
|---|---|---|
| 1. | "The Wake" |
| 2. | "Rebirth" |
| 3. | "The Only One" |
| 4. | "Burn" |
| 5. | "Vengeance" |
| 6. | "The Shadow of Life" |
| 7. | "Black Day" |
| 8. | "No Life" |
| 9. | "Abney Park" |
| 10. | "The Change Cage" |

- From Dreams Or Angels (2002)
- Twisted & Broken: Abney Park Remixed (This album is available from the band as part of a special package)
- Taxidermy (2005)
- The Death of Tragedy (2005)

Lost Horizons (2008)
| No. | Title | Length |
|---|---|---|
| 1. | "Airship Pirate" |
| 2. | "The Emperor's Wives" |
| 3. | "Sleep Isabella" |
| 4. | "She" |
| 5. | "The Secret Life of Dr Calgori" |
| 6. | "This Dark and Twisty Road" |
| 7. | "Herr Drosselmyer's Doll" |
| 8. | "Virus" |
| 9. | "I Am Stretched On Your Grave" |
| 10. | "Post Apocalypse Punk" |

Dark Christmas (Special website digital release, 2009)
| No. | Title | Length |
|---|---|---|
| 1. | "Little Drummer Boy" |
| 2. | "Winter Wonderland" |
| 3. | "Dance of the Sugar Plumb Fairies" |
| 4. | "Carol Of The Bells" |
| 5. | "Rudolf" |
| 6. | "God Rest Ye Merry Gentlemen" |
| 7. | "Good King Wenceslas" |
| 8. | "Coventry Carol" |
| 9. | "We Three Kings" |
| 10. | "Silent Night" |

Æther Shanties (2009)
| No. | Title | Length |
|---|---|---|
| 1. | "Under the Radar" |
| 2. | "Building Steam" |
| 3. | "Until the Day You Die" |
| 4. | "My Life" |
| 5. | "Wanderlust" |
| 6. | "Throw Them Overboard" |
| 7. | "The Derelict" |
| 8. | "Victoria" |
| 9. | "Aether Shanty" |
| 10. | "The Clockyard" |
| 11. | "Too Far to Turn Back" |

The End of Days (2010)
| No. | Title | Length |
|---|---|---|
| 1. | "The End of Days" |
| 2. | "Neobedouin" |
| 3. | "The Wrath of Fate" |
| 4. | "I've Been Wrong Before" |
| 5. | "Inside the Cage" |
| 6. | "Fight or Flight" |
| 7. | "Victorian Vigilante" |
| 8. | "Chronofax" |
| 9. | "Letters Between a Little Boy and Himself as an Adult" |
| 10. | "Beautiful Decline" |
| 11. | "Off the Grid" |
| 12. | "To The Apocalypse in Daddy's Sidecar" |
| 13. | "Space Cowboy" |

Off The Grid (2011)
| No. | Title | Length |
|---|---|---|
| 1. | "Off The Grid" |
| 2. | "The Ballad Of Ranch Hand Robbie" |
| 3. | "I’ve Been Wrong Before" |
| 4. | "Bad Things Coming" |
| 5. | "Evil Man" |
| 6. | "To The Apocalypse In Daddy’s Sidecar" |
| 7. | "The Wrong Side" |
| 8. | "Stigmata Martyr" |
| 9. | "Aether Shanties" |
| 10. | "Increased Chances (The Apocalypse) (cover of Increased Chances by Chitlins, Whiskey & Skirt from the video game Full Throttle)" |
| 11. | "Space Cowboy" |
| 12. | "Neither One Lets Go" |

Ancient World (2012)
| No. | Title | Length |
|---|---|---|
| 1. | "Steampunk Revolution" |
| 2. | "Scupper Shanty" |
| 3. | "The Story That Never Starts" |
| 4. | "Ancient World" |
| 5. | "Waiting For You" |
| 6. | "Terrible Affliction" |
| 7. | "Ragtime Punk" |
| 8. | "The Ballad of Captain Robert" |
| 9. | "Can't Talk About It" |
| 10. | "Tricked the Machine" |
| 11. | "Things Could Be Worse" |
| 12. | "Fix the Boat or Swim" |
| 13. | "Jealousy" |
| 14. | "Automaton" |
| 15. | "Steampunk Revolution (Instrumental)" |

Through Your Eyes on Christmas Eve (2012)
| No. | Title | Length |
|---|---|---|
| 1. | "Through Your Eyes On Christmas Eve" |
| 2. | "O Holy Night" |
| 3. | "We Three Kings" |
| 4. | "Jingle Bells" |
| 5. | "Santa Claus is Coming To Town" |
| 6. | "Winter Wonderland" |
| 7. | "Baby, It’s Cold Outside" |
| 8. | "The Little Drummer Boy" |
| 9. | "‘Zat you, Santa Claus?" |
| 10. | "Twelve Days Of Christmas" |
| 11. | "Dance of The Sugarplum Fairy" |

The Circus At The End Of The World (2013)
| No. | Title | Length |
|---|---|---|
| 1. | "Circus At The End Of The World" |
| 2. | "Blowing Off Steam" |
| 3. | "The Anthropophagists' Club" |
| 4. | "Follow Me If You Want To Live" |
| 5. | "Not Silent" |
| 6. | "Life's The Thing" |
| 7. | "Buy This Captain Rum" |
| 8. | "Rise Up" |
| 9. | "Scheherazade" |
| 10. | "Dominion Of Dust" |
| 11. | "Katyusha" |
| 12. | "In Time" |
| 13. | "Rosie And Max" |

Live At The End Of Days (2014)
| No. | Title | Length |
|---|---|---|
| 1. | "Intro to the End of Days" |
| 2. | "Building Steam" |
| 3. | "End of Days" |
| 4. | "Neobeduoin" |
| 5. | "Sleep Isabella" |
| 6. | "The Story That Never Starts" |
| 7. | "Throw Them Overboard" |
| 8. | "Until the Day You Die" |
| 9. | "(Crowd Banter) But That is Not This Day" |
| 10. | "The Circus at the End of the World" |
| 11. | "Blowing Off Steam" |
| 12. | "The Anthropophagists' Club" |
| 13. | "Victorian Vigilante" |
| 14. | "Bad Things Coming" |
| 15. | "Wanderlust" |
| 16. | "Steampunk Revolution" |
| 17. | "Scupper Shanty" |
| 18. | "Dominion of Dust" |
| 19. | "Off the Grid" |
| 20. | "Space Cowboy" |
| 21. | "To the Apocalypse in Daddy's Sidecar" |
| 22. | "Ancient World" |
| 23. | "Æther Shanty" |
| 24. | "Airship Pirate" |
| 25. | "The Wrong Side" |
| 26. | "(Crowd Banter) Encore!" |
| 27. | "Rise UP" |

Nomad (2014)
| No. | Title | Length |
|---|---|---|
| 1. | "Tribal Nomad" | 3:49 |
| 2. | "Born at the Wrong Time" | 4:11 |
| 3. | "Whole Life Crisis" | 3:03 |
| 4. | "Two Elixirs" | 3:26 |
| 5. | "On the Fringe" | 3:11 |
| 6. | "Pity the Free Man" | 3:10 |
| 7. | "Escape the Ground" | 4:30 |
| 8. | "Stranger Than Anything You Could Have Possibly Imagined (The Casbah Intro)" | 0:24 |
| 9. | "The Casbah" | 3:36 |
| 10. | "Night Train from Saint Petersburg" | 3:31 |
| 11. | "I'm Glad I Lost You" | 2:57 |
| 12. | "Special" | 2:19 |
| 13. | "Give'em What For" | 2:41 |
| 14. | "Clockwork Heart" | 2:41 |
| Total length: | | 43:29 |

Wasteland (2015)
| No. | Title | Length |
|---|---|---|
| 1. | "The Clone Factories" |
| 2. | "Wasteland Warrior" |
| 3. | "Out of Darkness" |
| 4. | "Witch Hunt" |
| 5. | "Walls" |
| 6. | "Fell to My Knees" |
| 7. | "Hired Gun" |
| 8. | "Minnie the Moocher" |
| 9. | "Protéger Tus Sueños" |
| 10. | "The Prayer" |
| 11. | "Away from the Things of Man" |

Under the Floor, Over the Wall (2016)
| No. | Title | Length |
|---|---|---|
| 1. | "Mister Overkill" |
| 2. | "Your Escape" |
| 3. | "Armor and Flight" |
| 4. | "His Imaginary World" |
| 5. | "Gimme a Reason" |
| 6. | "No Way Out" |
| 7. | "Creep 2016" |
| 8. | "Under the Floor, Over the Wall" |
| 9. | "Ripples of Epiphany" |
| 10. | "Cut Anchor" |
| 11. | "The Vilainizer" |
| 12. | "Don't Wanna Worry" |
| 13. | "Souls From Lullabys" |
| 14. | "The Traveler's Curse" |

Crash (2017)
| No. | Title | Length |
|---|---|---|
| 1. | "Reboot" |
| 2. | "Work Hard" |
| 3. | "Beater, Battered And Abused" |
| 4. | "Side By Side" |
| 5. | "Crash" |
| 6. | "Captain Ulysses" |
| 7. | "Poor And Free And Lost At Sea" |
| 8. | "The Rum Talking" |
| 9. | "The Tree House At The End Of The World" |
| 10. | "The Lords Prayer" |

Scallywag (2018)
| No. | Title | Length |
|---|---|---|
| 1. | "Scallywag Swing" |
| 2. | "Clockwork Courtesan" |
| 3. | "Dark Vocation" |
| 4. | "Proclivity of Lies" |
| 5. | "We’re Going Down" |
| 6. | "Two Little Words" |
| 7. | "Play" |
| 8. | "Golden Cage" |
| 9. | "Artificial Windows" |
| 10. | "Life in an Instant" |
| 11. | "Glass Jaw" |
| 12. | "Root of all Evil" |

Abney Park's New Nostalgics (2019)
| No. | Title | Length |
|---|---|---|
| 1. | "Strip Polka (1942)" |
| 2. | "Come Take a Trip in My Airship (1909)" |
| 3. | "Here Comes the Boogieman (1938)" |
| 4. | "Minnie the Moocher (1931)" |
| 5. | "Bei Mir Bist Du Schoen (1932)" |
| 6. | "A Pocket Full of Dreams (1928)" |
| 7. | "Take Me Up In Your Airship Willie (1904)" |
| 8. | "Brother Can You Spare a Dime (1930)" |

Abney Park's Songs Of The Sea (2019)
| No. | Title | Length |
|---|---|---|
| 1. | "Sailing Retrograde *" |
| 2. | "Scupper Shanty *" |
| 3. | "Captain Ulysses" |
| 4. | "Poor And Free and Lost at Sea *" |
| 5. | "Ancore Or Sail *" |
| 6. | "The Wrath Of Fate" |
| 7. | "Buy The Captain Rum" |
| 8. | "The Ballad of Captain Robert" |
| 9. | "Aether Shanty" |
| 10. | "Under The Radar" |

Iconoclast (2019)
| No. | Title | Length |
|---|---|---|
| 1. | "Come One Come All" |
| 2. | "Back To Zero" |
| 3. | "The Demon" |
| 4. | "Sailing Retrograde" |
| 5. | "Survival Of The Species" |
| 6. | "Chitty Chitty Bang Bang" |
| 7. | "Dystopia Now" |
| 8. | "Doldrums" |
| 9. | "Back To My Start" |
| 10. | "Welcome To The Throng" |
| 11. | "Magic Dance" |
| 12. | "Some Wounds Don't Heal" |
| 13. | "So What Now?" |
| 14. | "Its Never Been Easy" |
| 15. | "Keep It Strange" |

Songs of Joy (2020)
| No. | Title | Length |
|---|---|---|
| 1. | "Same Setting Different Stories" |
| 2. | "Your Escape" |
| 3. | "Out Of Darkness" |
| 4. | "Ripples Of Epiphany" |
| 5. | "Two Little Worlds" |
| 6. | "Play" |
| 7. | "Away From The Things Of Man" |
| 8. | "Souls From Lullbys" |
| 9. | "The Tree House At The End Of The World" |
| 10. | "Poor and Free and Lost At Sea" |
| 11. | "Magic Dance" |
| 12. | "Chitty Chitty Bang Bang" |

Technoshanties (2021)
| No. | Title | Length |
|---|---|---|
| 1. | "Down To Old Maui" |
| 2. | "The Last Shanty" |
| 3. | "The Wellerman" |
| 4. | "Aether Shanties, 2021 Version" |
| 5. | "Blow The Man Down" |
| 6. | "A Drop Of Nelson's Blood" |
| 7. | "Under The Radar" |
| 8. | "Drunken Sailor" |
| 9. | "Spanish Ladies (We'll Rant and We'll Roar)" |
| 10. | "The Wrath Of Fate, 2021 Version" |
| 11. | "Whale Of A Tale" |
| 12. | "The Derelict" |

Compilations:

- Building Steam (2014) Live DVD

Retro-Future Vagabond (2014)
| No. | Title | Length |
|---|---|---|
| 1. | "Airship Pirate" | 4:00 |
| 2. | "Scupper Shanty" | 2:56 |
| 3. | "Follow Me If You Want To Live" | 3:23 |
| 4. | "Sleep Isabella" | 4:27 |
| 5. | "Not Silent" | 4:06 |
| 6. | "Off The Grid" | 2:37 |
| 7. | "The Story That Never Starts" | 4:07 |
| 8. | "Until The Day You Die" | 2:46 |
| 9. | "The Anthropophagists' Club" | 3:39 |
| 10. | "Chronofax (Letter Between A Little Boy & Himself As An Adult)" | 4:19 |
| Total length: | | 36:20 |

- The Music Videos + Live From Russia (2015) Live BD/DVD
- Anachronomicon (2016) 5CD collection divided by theme

Nonfiction (2016)
| No. | Title | Length |
|---|---|---|
| 1. | "Ripples Of Epiphany" |
| 2. | "Can’t Talk About It" |
| 3. | "In Time" |
| 4. | "Escape The Ground" |
| 5. | "I’m Glad I Lost You" |
| 6. | "Ancient World" |
| 7. | "Night Train From Saint Petersburg" |
| 8. | "Proteger Tus Sueños" |
| 9. | "Not Silent" |
| 10. | "Away From The Things Of Man" |
| 11. | "Tricked The Machine" |
| 12. | "Whole Life Crisis" |
| 13. | "Victoria" |
| 14. | "Neither One Lets Go" |

Other songs:

- Cellophane Wings (It was written even before the earlier days. Furthermore, it wasn't recorded or performed live but these lyrics are part of the Airship Pirates RPG among the other songs)
- Custom Song "Sleep Isabella" (singer Robert Brown offered to rewrite and rerecord the lyrics of this song for a custom version)

== Airship Pirates RPG ==
In August 2011 Cakebread & Walton, using Cubicle 7 Entertainment as their publisher, released a role-playing game based on the world of Abney Park's backstory. Set in the post-apocalyptic world after their album, The End Of Days – a future world with a severely disrupted timeline – Airship Pirates features steampunk themes and Victorian-era style. Airship Pirates places players as air pirates in command of their own steam-powered airships. There they will seek not only to pillage the skies, but to plunder history, possibly causing even greater disruption to the past. Meanwhile, the world below struggles in Victorian-style squalor under an oppressive government that maintains control through clockwork policemen. In December 2011, the RPG game won Diehard GameFAN's "Best Core Rulebook of 2011" award.

== Novels ==
In 2012, a novel was released entitled The Wrath of Fate: Book 1 of The Airship Pirate Chronicles, by Robert Brown. Set in a post-apocalyptic steampunk future, the book is a companion to Abney Park's music and RPG game, exploring Abney Park's backstory and fictional setting in greater detail. A second novel in the series, Retrograde, came out in 2013, followed by a third novel, The Toyshop At The End Of The World, in 2015.

== See also ==
- List of steampunk works § Steampunk musicians
