= Jim Mageean =

English folk singer

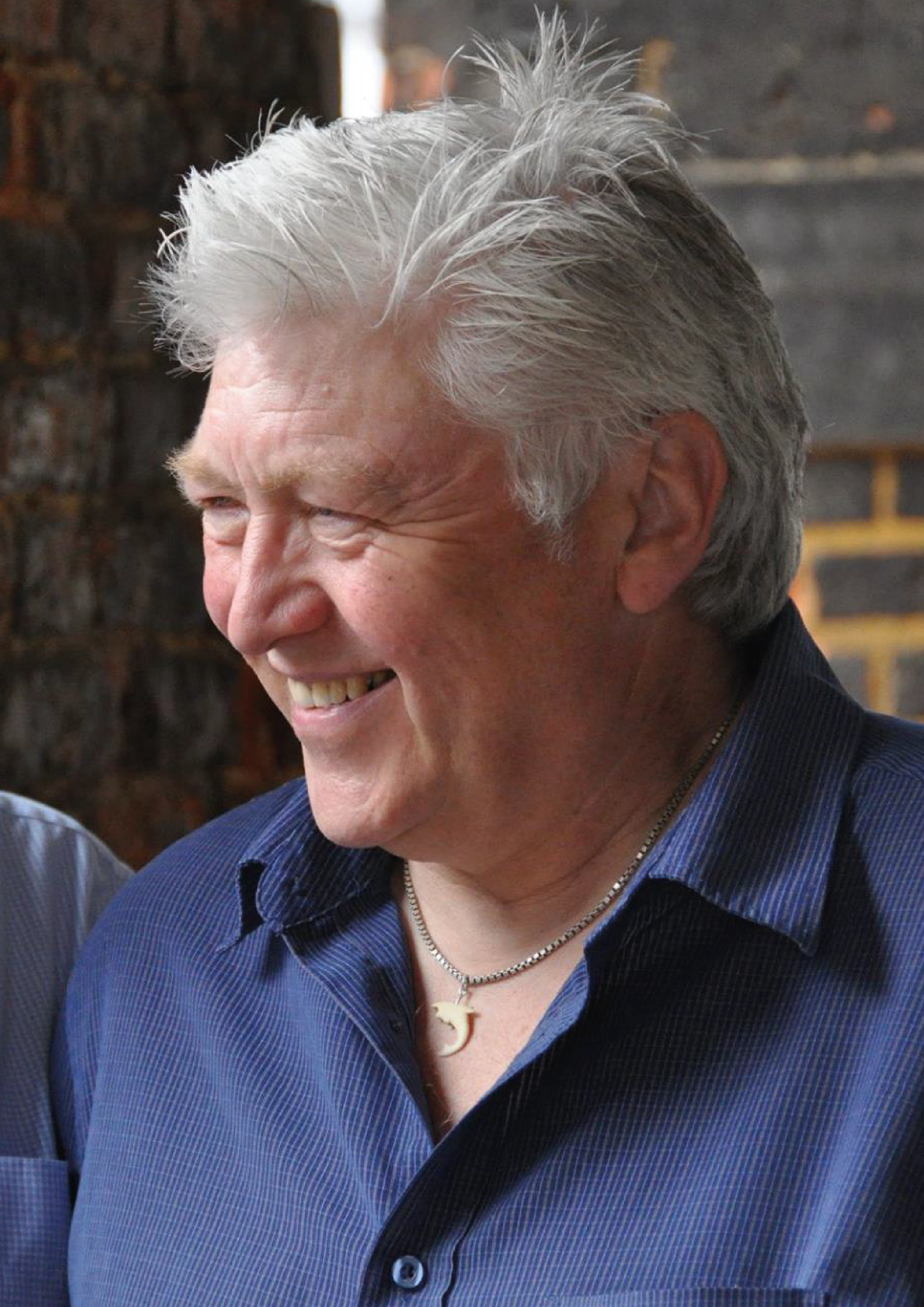
- Jim Mageean pictured in 2014

Background information
- Also known as: 'Shanty Jim' 'The Shanty King'
- Born: James Mageean; 27 January 1948 (age 78); Gosforth, Newcastle Upon Tyne, England
- Genres: Folk music
- Instrument: Vocals
- Years active: 1963–present

Jim Mageean (born 27 January 1948) is an English folk singer based in Cullercoats, Tyne and Wear, England, specialising in Sea Shanties, traditional maritime music and "Geordie" songs from his native North East of England.

== Biography ==
Mageean was born in Gosforth. The eldest of four children having two brothers, Patrick and Peter, and a sister, Sheila. His father Charlie Mageean was part of a riveting gang in the Tyne shipyards at that time but soon after became a coal miner: "I asked my dad once if he was present at my birth and he said that Newcastle United were playing at home to Stoke City that day so, of course, he was at the match!"

Mageean spent his early years in a mining village, Coxlodge, where he attended a small village school.

He started singing as a very young child, learning songs from his grandmother, Elsie, but did not know they were folk songs until much later. His parents, Peggy and Charlie Mageean, were both good singers and often had late night singing parties in the house, particularly at New Year. Mageean soon found out that if you could sing then you could stay up late at the party so he learned several Geordie songs.

In 1963 he went to his first folk club as a teenager at The Bridge, Newcastle upon Tyne. Then in 1964 he went to his first folk festival in Scarborough, North Yorkshire. There he met Stan Hugill who was singing with The Spinners at the time. He started writing to Stan and invited him to Newcastle where he did a short tour. They became good friends and remained so until Hugill's death in 1992.

He was educated at Newcastle Polytechnic (now Northumbria University) where he obtained a degree in Physics and became a Chartered Engineer. He later studied for a P.G.C.E to allow him to teach. He spent ten years of his life in London singing as a resident in several of the folk clubs including ‘Herga’, ‘Dingles’ and ‘The Cellar’ in Cecil Sharp House and working in Engineering and Education but later returned to his native North East as a Senior Lecturer in Engineering at Newcastle College.

In 1983 he and Johnny Collins, performing as a duo, won the Intervision Song Contest in Rostock, in East Germany. Later, in 1987, they were invited by the East German government to perform at a sea shanty festival in Berlin commemorating the city's founding. Mageean and Collins performed together until 2009 when Johnny Collins died on tour in Gdańsk, Poland. For 35 years Mageean and Collins sang at festivals and concerts throughout Europe, and North America and performed in France, Germany, Ireland, Netherlands, Scandinavia, Poland, United States and Canada.

In 1986 the Cutty Sark Tall Ships Race came to Newcastle for the first time and he was asked to form a shanty group to perform there. He formed The Keelers who are still performing 3 decades and 5 albums later. He has also been involved in duos with both Graeme Knights from London and Pat Sheridan from Dublin. He also sings in a trio with Barrie and Ingrid Temple called ‘JIB’ (Jim, Ingrid & Barrie).

In 2010 Mageean appeared on BBC Four's Shanties and Sea Songs with Gareth Malone to discuss North East sea songs and Grace Darling.

In 2013 BBC Radio 2 Mageean was interviewed about shanties by Richard Hawley as part of his 'The Drunken Sailor' program. The show was well received and was featured in BBC Radio 4's 'Pick of the week.'

He tutored for a while on the Folk Music Degree course at Newcastle University and passed some of his songs on to the students there as well as to other young groups, in particular The Unthanks and The Young'uns, the latter of which personally thanked him when they won 'Best Group' in the 2015 BBC Radio 2 Folk Awards. He now resides in Cullercoats, Newcastle Upon Tyne He has three children, Tam, Joby and Rose.

=== Master and Commander ===
Mageean's arrangement of the song "Don't Forget Your Old Shipmates" was used in the 2003 historical epic Master and Commander: The Far Side of the World. The movie's director Peter Weir was looking for an authentic British Navy song from 1805 when he discovered Mageean's version of the song from his 1978 album Of Ships... and Men.

== Discography ==
- The Capstan Bar (1978)
- The Shanty Men (1978) Compilation Album
- Of Ships...And Men (1978)
- Make the Rafters Roar (1979) with Johnny Collins
- Aall Tegithor like the Foaks O'Shields (1981) Compilation Album
- Live at Herga! (1982) with Johnny Collins
- Strontrace (1983) with Johnny Collins
- Keelhaulin' (1991) with The Keelers
- Farewell to the Master (1993) with The Keelers
- Coming of Age (1996) with Johnny Collins - 21 Sea Shanties to celebrate 21 years of singing with Johnny.
- On The North Sea Ground (1998) with The Keelers
- Heave Away, Haul Away (2005) with The Keelers
- Good Times (2008) with Graeme Knights and Johnny Collins
- Gan Canny (2010)
- Sorrows Away (2011) with Graeme Knights
- Hard Aground (2011) with Pat Sheridan
- Short Sharp Shanties Vols 1, 2 &3 (2011/2012) songs collected by Cecil Sharp from John Short of Watchet, Somerset in 1914
- Gannin to Blaydon Races (2012) the songs of Geordie Ridley (as part of The Northumbria Anthology Project)
- Tyne and Tide (2013) with The Keelers
- Carrying Coals (2015) with JIB
- Billy Was A Miner (2019) with JIB
- 'Heave Away" (2020) Collection of 26 Heaving Shanties, with Booklet of all words and Introduction to Heaving Shanties for pushing work on board
- 'Haul Away' ( 2020) Collection of 34 Hauling Shanties, with Booklet of all words and Introduction to Hauling Shanties for pulling work on board
- 'Sail Away' (2021) Collection of 21 Forebitters and Sea Songs, with Booklet of all words and background to each song
