= Robert Brown (musician) =

American singer

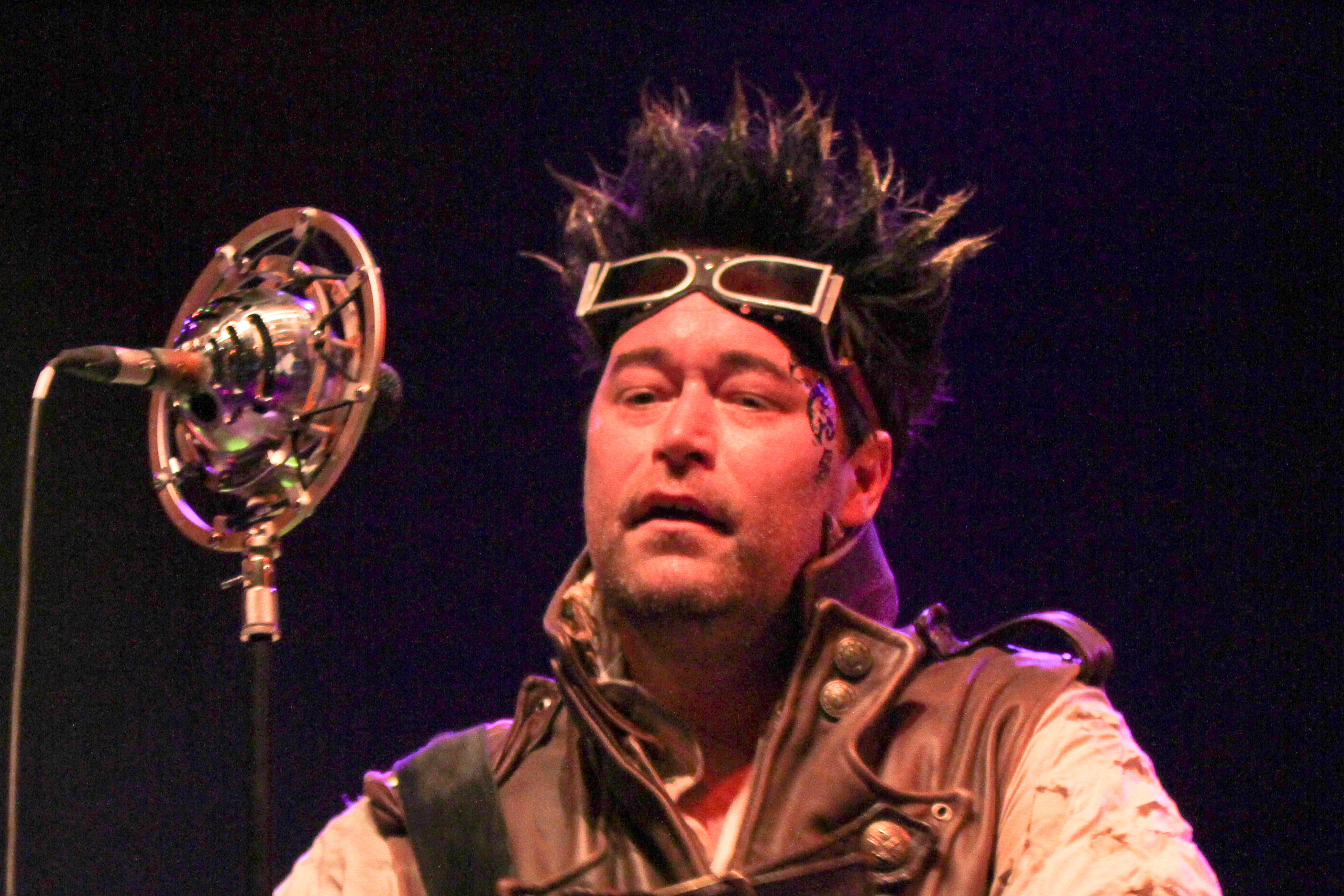
- "Captain" Robert Brown

Background information
- Born: May 27, 1970 (age 56)
- Origin: Seattle, United States
- Genres: Industrial; folk
- Years active: 1997–present
- Website: http://robert-from-ap.livejournal.com

Robert Brown (born May 27, 1970), sometimes known as Captain Robert, is an American musician and multi-instrumentalist. He is best known as the lead vocalist and principal songwriter of the steampunk band Abney Park.

Brown was born in Pullman, Washington, United States. A large part of Brown's childhood was spent traveling in South East Asia with his mother Carolyn Brown Heinz, a well known cultural anthropologist. Brown spent time in India, China, Thailand, and Polynesia, with his mother during her research.

Brown briefly attended the University of London and lived near Abney Park Cemetery. Brown relocated to Seattle at the height of the Grunge movement, where he started the dark electronica band "October 27th", and later formed "the EaTen" with guitarist Robert Hazelton (now with the "Deadly Nightshade Botanical Society"). Soon after, they changed the band's name from the EaTen to Abney Park, after the London cemetery.

Brown is the principal songwriter in Abney Park. In addition to this, he is the band's lead singer, and plays darbuka, diatonic button accordion (melodeon), and harmonica. Brown's lyrical and musical style is noted for having a unique blend of many musical nationalities and eras. Brown is also responsible for making most of the band's exotic steampunk instruments.

Brown has authored several novels that explore Abney Park's fictional backstory, including The Wrath of Fate, Retrograde, and The Toyshop at the End of the World. He also helped in the development of Airship Pirates, an RPG based on these books and the band's lyrics.

Brown has made appearances on MTV, G4tV, and King 5 Evening Magazine and has been interviewed in many genre websites, magazines, and newspapers, including The Guardian, The New York Times, and the Los Angeles Times.

Robert is married to fellow band member Kristina Erickson and has two children, Isabella and Chloe.
