= Icehouse discography =

- Studio albums: 7
- Extended plays: 2
- Soundtrack albums: 1
- Live albums: 3
- Compilation albums: 7
- Singles: 42
- Video albums: 3
- Music videos: 31

The discography of Icehouse, an Australian rock and synth-pop band, includes releases under the earlier band name, Flowers, which was formed in 1977 by the mainstay Iva Davies, and was renamed Icehouse in 1981; material was also released by "Iva Davies and Icehouse". Flowers or Icehouse have released seven studio albums, one soundtrack album, as well as four remix albums and 41 singles.

As Flowers, in 1980 they released three singles and the album Icehouse in Australia on the independent Regular Records label. After signing with UK-based Chrysalis Records, Flowers changed their name to Icehouse to avoid confusion with similarly named bands. From 1981, Chrysalis released Flowers' material under the Icehouse name including the single "Icehouse" (not released separately in Australia) with a video clip directed by Russell Mulcahy in June 1981. The first new material under the name Icehouse was the Australian 1981 single-only release "Love in Motion", recorded in London while on tour, upon return to Australia Icehouse separated. Davies recorded the 1982 album Primitive Man (released in UK as Love in Motion, 1983) virtually as a solo artist, co-producing with Keith Forsey, but it was released under the name Icehouse. Davies then formed a new line-up to tour UK and North America promoting the album. In 1983, Icehouse released Fresco as an EP, which was the first material from the new line-up. Davies used a similar approach with subsequent releases often having only one or two band members in for recording and then taking an extended line-up out on tour to promote the latest material.

== Albums ==
=== Studio albums ===
Year	Title	Chart peak positions						Certifications
Year	Title	AUS	GER	NZ	SWE	UK	US	Certifications
Icehouse^{[a]}	Released: 10 October 1980; Label: Regular, Chrysalis; Producer: Cameron Allan, Iva Davies	4	—	2	—	—	82	ARIA: 5× Platinum; RMNZ: 4× Platinum
Primitive Man^{[b]}	Released: 6 September 1982; Label: Regular / Chrysalis; Producer: Iva Davies, Keith Forsey	3	5	1	31	64	129	ARIA: Platinum; RMNZ: Platinum
Sidewalk	Released: 26 June 1984; Label: Regular / Chrysalis; Producer: Iva Davies	8	39	2	—	—	—	RMNZ: Gold
Measure for Measure	Released: 21 April 1986; Label: Regular / Chrysalis; Producer: David Lord, Rhett Davies	8	37	2	—	—	55	ARIA: Gold; RMNZ: Gold
Man of Colours	Released: 21 September 1987; Label: Regular / Chrysalis; Producer: David Lord	1	—	1	—	93	43	ARIA: 7× Platinum; MC: Gold; RMNZ: Platinum
Code Blue	Released: 11 November 1990; Label: Regular; Producer: Nick Launay	7	—	7	—	—	—	ARIA: Platinum
Big Wheel	Released: 25 October 1993; Label: dIVA / Massive; Producer: Iva Davies	44	—	—	—	—	—	
"—" denotes releases that did not chart or were not released in that country.

a Icehouse was released when the band were called Flowers; in some markets this album is called Flowers by Icehouse.
b Primitive Man was released in the UK in 1983 as Love in Motion

=== Soundtrack albums ===
Title	Details	Charts peak position
Title	Details	NZ
The Berlin Tapes (credited to Iva Davies and Icehouse)	Released: October 1995; Label: dIVA / Massive; Producer: Iva Davies	47

=== Remix albums ===
Title	Details	Charts peak position
Title	Details	AUS
Full Circle	Released: December 1994; Label: Massive; Producer: Iva Davies, various	—
Meltdown	Released: 2002; Label: dIVA / Warner Music Australia; Producer: Steve Millard	100
The Extended Mixes, Vol. 1	Released: 1 January 2013; Label: dIVA / Universal Music Australia; Producer: Iva Davies, various	—
The Extended Mixes, Vol. 2	Released: 1 January 2013; Label: dIVA / UMA; Producer: Iva Davies, various	—
"—" denotes releases that did not chart or were not released in that country.

=== Live albums ===
Title	Details	Chart peak position
Title	Details	AUS
DubHOUSE	Released: 1 January 2014; Label: dIVA; Producer: Iva Davies	—
Icehouse in Concert	Released: 28 August 2015; Label: dIVA / Universal Music Australia; Producer: Iva Davies	—
Icehouse Plays Flowers	Released: 30 October 2020; Label: dIVA (DIVAU1011); Recorded live at the St. Kilda Festival 9th Feb 2020.	63
1984 Live Desk Tape	Released: June 2024; Label: dIVA	—
"—" denotes releases that did not chart or were not released in that country.

=== Compilation albums ===
Title	Details	Chart peak positions			Certifications
Title	Details	AUS	GER	NZ	Certifications
Great Southern Land	Released: 6 November 1989; Label: Regular / Chrysalis; Format: CD, VHS	2	53	5	ARIA: 2× Platinum; RMNZ: Platinum
Masterfile	Released: 3 November 1992; Label: Massive; Format: CD, VHS	25	—	—	ARIA: Platinum
The Singles (A sides... and selected B sides)	Released: February 1996; Label: Massive / dIVA; Format: Limited Edition 3× CD	—	—	—	
Love in Motion	Released: September 1996 (Europe); Label: Massive / dIVA; Format: CD	—N/a	—	—N/a	
No Promises	Released: 1997; Label: Massive / dIVA; Format: CD	—	—	—	
Heroes	Released: August 2004; Label: Interscope; Format: CD	68	—	—	
White Heat: 30 Hits	Released: August 2011; Label: Universal Music Australia; Format: 2× CD, DVD	5	—	10	ARIA: Platinum
"—" denotes releases that did not chart or were not released in that country.

== Extended plays ==
Title	Details	Chart peak positions
Title	Details	AUS
Fresco	Released: 1983 (North America); Label: Regular / Chrysalis; Producer: Iva Davies, Keith Forsey	—N/a
Spin One	Released: June 1993; Label: dIVA / Massive; Producer: Iva Davies	112
"—" denotes releases that did not chart or were not released in that country.

== Singles ==
Year	Title	Chart peak positions									Album
Year	Title	AUS	AUT	GER	NZ	SWI	UK	US	US Rock	US Dance	Album
1980	"Can't Help Myself"	10	—	—	29	—	—	—	—	50	Icehouse
1980	"We Can Get Together"	16	—	—	36	—	—	62	51	—	Icehouse
1981	"Walls"	20	—	—	43	—	—	—	—	—	Icehouse
1981	"Icehouse"	—N/a	—	—	—N/a	—	—	—	28	—	Icehouse
1981	"Love in Motion"	10	—	—	35	—	—	—	—	—	Single only
1982	"Great Southern Land"	5	—	—	10	—	83	—	—	—	Primitive Man
1982	"Hey Little Girl"	7	9	5	9	2	17	—	31	55	Primitive Man
1983	"Street Café"	57	—	28	40	—	62	—	—	—	Primitive Man
1983	"Uniform" (UK/US only release)	—N/a	—	—	—N/a	—	83	—	—	—	Primitive Man
1984	"Taking the Town"	29	—	—	32	—	—	—	—	—	Sidewalk
1984	"Don't Believe Anymore"	31	—	—	36	—	—	—	—	—	Sidewalk
1984	"Dusty Pages"	82	—	—	—	—	—	—	—	—	Sidewalk
1985	"No Promises"	30	—	—	29	—	72	79	9	7	Measure for Measure
1986	"Baby, You're So Strange"	14	—	—	21	—	—	—	—	—	Measure for Measure
1986	"Mr. Big"	18	—	—	15	—	—	—	—	—	Measure for Measure
1986	"Cross the Border"	65	—	—	—	—	—	—	19	—	Measure for Measure
1986	"Paradise" (UK/US only release)	—N/a	—	—	—N/a	—	—	—	—	—	Measure for Measure
1987	"Crazy"	4	—	—	10	—	38	14	10	—	Man of Colours
1987	"Electric Blue"	1	—	—	4	—	53	7	10	—	Man of Colours
1987	"My Obsession"	12	—	—	14	—	—	88	—	—	Man of Colours
1988	"Man of Colours"	28	—	—	—	—	—	—	—	—	Man of Colours
1988	"Nothing Too Serious"	29	—	—	39	—	—	—	—	—	Man of Colours
1989	"Touch the Fire"	13	—	—	39	—	112	84	—	—	Great Southern Land
1990	"Jimmy Dean"	47	—	—	—	—	—	—	—	—	Great Southern Land
1990	"Big Fun"	47	—	—	—	—	—	—	—	—	Code Blue
1990	"Miss Divine"	16	—	—	—	—	—	—	—	—	Code Blue
1990	"Anything Is Possible"	49	—	—	30	—	—	—	—	—	Code Blue
1991	"Where the River Meets the Sea"	124	—	—	—	—	—	—	—	—	Code Blue
1992	"Love in Motion" (featuring Christina Amphlett)	74	—	—	—	—	—	—	—	—	Masterfile
1993	"Satellite"	83	—	—	—	—	—	—	—	—	Big Wheel
1993	"Big Wheel"	131	—	—	—	—	—	—	—	—	Big Wheel
1994	"Invisible People"	—	—	—	—	—	—	—	—	—	Big Wheel
1995	"Heaven" (Iva Davis and Icehouse)	133	—	—	—	—	—	—	—	—	The Berlin Tapes
1996	"Complicated Game" / "Loving the Alien" (Iva Davis and Icehouse)	—	—	—	—	—	—	—	—	—	The Berlin Tapes
1997	"Hey Little Girl" ('97 Remixes)	—	—	—	—	—	182	—	—	—	Single only
2002	"Lay Your Hands on Me" (Icehouse vs Speed of Light)	85	—	—	—	—	—	—	—	—	Meltdown
2004	"Street Café (2004)" (Europe release only)	—N/a	—	—	—N/a	—	—	—	—	—	Meltdown
2004	"Heroes" (The Athens Mix)	87	—	—	—	—	—	—	—	—	Heroes
2015	"Endless Ocean" (Paul Reef vs Icehouse)	—	—	—	—	—	—	—	—	—	Singles only
2021	"Hey Little Girl" (Antipodeans vs Icehouse)	—	—	—	—	—	—	—	—	—	Singles only
2023	"Great Southern Land" (Cassian vs Icehouse)	—	—	—	—	—	—	—	—	—	Singles only
2023	"Get It On" (with Simple Minds)	—	—	—	—	—	—	—	—	—	Singles only
"—" denotes releases that did not chart or were not released in that country.

== Music videos ==
Year	Title	Director(s)
1980	"Can't Help Myself"	
1980	"We Can Get Together"	
1981	"Sister" (live)	
1981	"Walls"	
1981	"Icehouse"	Russell Mulcahy
1982	"Great Southern Land"	
1982	"Hey Little Girl"	Russell Mulcahy
1983	"Street Café"	Russell Mulcahy
1984	"Taking the Town"	Steve Hopkins
1984	"Don't Believe Anymore"	Marcello Anciano
1985	"No Promises"	John Scarlett-Davies
1986	"Baby You're So Strange"	
1986	"No Promises" (US version)	Dee Trattmann
1986	"Mr. Big"	
1986	"Cross the Border"	John Jopson
1987	"Crazy" (Australian version)	Mark Joffe
1987	"Electric Blue"	John Jopson
1987	"Crazy" (US version)	John Jopson
1988	"My Obsession"	John Jopson
1988	"Man of Colours"	
1988	"Nothing Too Serious"	
1989	"Great Southern Land" (US version)	
1989	"Touch the Fire"	
1990	"Big Fun"	
1990	"Miss Divine"	
1990	"Anything Is Possible"	
1992	"Love in Motion" (featuring Christina Amphlett)	
1993	"Satellite"	
1993	"Big Wheel"	
1994	"Invisible People"	
2021	"Hey Little Girl"	

== Video albums ==
Title	Details
Icehouse: Live at the Ritz	Released: 1987; Label: Chrysalis / Massive; Format: VHS, Beta; Recorded 14 August 1986 at New York City's Ritz Hotel.
Great Southern Land	Released: 1989; Label: Regular Records (83078); Format: VHS; Recorded in 1989
Masterfile - The Video	Released: 1992; Label: Massive Video (MV 001); Format: VHS; 16 video clips
