= White Heat: 30 Hits =

Compilation album by Icehouse
- Released: 26 August 2011
- Recorded: 1980–1993
- Genres: Rock; new wave; synth-pop
- Labels: Diva; Universal Music
- Producers: Cameron Allan; Iva Davies; Steve Nye; Keith Forsey; John Brand; David Lord; Rhett Davies; Nick Launay; Bill Laswell

Icehouse chronology
Heroes (2004)	White Heat: 30 Hits (2011)

White Heat: 30 Hits is a two-disc compilation album by Australian rock band Icehouse, released on 26 August 2011 in Australia. While it is technically their third best-of compilation, following 1989's Great Southern Land and 1992's Masterfile (not counting a singles box set released in the mid-1990s that was not widely distributed), it is the first such compilation spanning the band's entire career, including both their early- to mid-1980s hits and material from their most commercially successful period, beginning with the studio album Man of Colours (1987).

The album presents the band's complete singles catalogue, all in chronological order, with 15 tracks on each disc. There is also a 3-disc edition which includes a DVD featuring all 32 of the band's music videos, also in chronological order. The DVD contains a 5.1 mix in Dolby Digital AC-3.

The album's cover art was designed by Sydney design studio Debaser, and features the laser cage in which Iva Davies performed during the band's time as Flowers. This can be seen in the "Flowers Folio" section of the band's website. The tracks were remastered by Steve Smart at Studios 301 Mastering.

== Track listing ==
Standard edition disc 1
No.	Title	Original album	Length
1.	"Can't Help Myself" (as Flowers)	Icehouse	3:10
2.	"We Can Get Together" (as Flowers)	Icehouse	3:46
3.	"Walls" (as Flowers)	Icehouse	4:22
4.	"Icehouse" (as Flowers)	Icehouse	4:24
5.	"Love in Motion" (original single mix)		3:40
6.	"Great Southern Land"	Primitive Man	5:16
7.	"Hey, Little Girl"	Primitive Man	4:25
8.	"Street Cafe" (single mix)	Primitive Man	4:12
9.	"Glam" (single version)	Primitive Man	3:22
10.	"Taking the Town"	Sidewalk	3:34
11.	"Don't Believe Anymore"	Sidewalk	5:17
12.	"Dusty Pages" (single version)	Sidewalk	4:03
13.	"No Promises"	Measure for Measure	4:40
14.	"Baby, You're So Strange"	Measure for Measure	3:58
15.	"Mr Big"	Measure for Measure	3:31

Standard edition disc 2
No.	Title	Original album	Length
1.	"Cross the Border"	Measure for Measure	4:23
2.	"Crazy"	Man of Colours	3:23
3.	"Electric Blue"	Man of Colours	4:24
4.	"My Obsession"	Man of Colours	4:09
5.	"Man of Colours"	Man of Colours	5:12
6.	"Nothing Too Serious"	Man of Colours	3:27
7.	"Touch the Fire"	Great Southern Land	3:48
8.	"Jimmy Dean"	Great Southern Land	3:42
9.	"Big Fun"	Code Blue	4:00
10.	"Miss Divine"	Code Blue	4:20
11.	"Anything Is Possible"	Code Blue	4:20
12.	"Satellite"	Big Wheel	4:19
13.	"Big Wheel"	Big Wheel	4:27
14.	"Invisible People"	Big Wheel	6:11
15.	"Love in Motion" (with Christina Amphlett)	Masterfile	4:41

=== DVD ===
1. "Can't Help Myself"
2. "We Can Get Together" (Australasian version)
3. "We Can Get Together" (international version)
4. "Walls"
5. "Icehouse"
6. "Love in Motion" (original version)
7. "Great Southern Land"
8. "Hey, Little Girl"
9. "Street Cafe"
10. "Glam"
11. "Taking the Town"
12. "Don't Believe Anymore"
13. "Dusty Pages"
14. "No Promises" (international version)
15. "No Promises" (UK version)
16. "Baby, You're So Strange"
17. "Mr Big"
18. "Cross the Border"
19. "Crazy" (Australasian version)
20. "Crazy" (international version)
21. "Electric Blue"
22. "My Obsession"
23. "Man of Colours"
24. "Nothing Too Serious"
25. "Touch the Fire"
26. "Big Fun"
27. "Miss Divine"
28. "Anything Is Possible"
29. "Satellite"
30. "Big Wheel"
31. "Invisible People"
32. "Love in Motion" (with Christina Amphlett)
33. "Sister" (from Countdown 1980)

== Charts ==
Chart (2011)	Peak position
Australian Albums (ARIA)	5
New Zealand Albums (RMNZ)	20

=== Year-end charts ===
Chart (2011)	Position
Australian Albums (ARIA)	54

== Certifications ==
Region	Certification	Certified units/sales
Australia (ARIA)	Platinum	70,000^{^}
^{^} Shipments figures based on certification alone.
