= The Singles (Icehouse album) =

Box set by Icehouse
- Released: February 1996
- Recorded: 1980–1995
- Genre: Rock; new wave; synth-pop
- Length: 3 Disc
- Label: Massive/Diva

Icehouse chronology
The Berlin Tapes (1995)	The Singles (1996)	Love in Motion (1996)

Professional ratings
Review scores
Source	Rating
AllMusic	2.5/5 stars

The Singles a.k.a. The Singles A sides... and selected B sides is a limited edition three-disc CD boxed set released by Australian rock/synth-pop band Icehouse in February 1996 on dIVA Records / Massive Records in Germany and Australia; it was re-released in 1999 into the US market.

== Track listing ==
Disc 1

1. "Can't Help Myself"
2. "We Can Get Together"
3. "Walls"
4. "Love in Motion"
5. "Send Somebody"
6. "Paradise Lost"
7. "All the Way"
8. "Great Southern Land"
9. "Hey Little Girl"
10. "Street Cafe"
11. "Over the Line"
12. "Taking the Town"
13. "Don't Believe Anymore"
14. "Dusty Pages"
15. "Stay Close Tonight"

Disc 2

1. "No Promises"
2. "Baby, You're So Strange"
3. "Mr. Big"
4. "Cross the Border"
5. "Too Late Now"
6. "Into the Wild"
7. "Crazy"
8. "Electric Blue"
9. "My Obsession"
10. "Man of Colours"
11. "Nothing Too Serious"
12. "Crazy" (Midnight Mix)
13. "Touch the Fire"
14. "Jimmy Dean"

Disc 3

1. "Big Fun"
2. "Miss Divine"
3. "Anything is Possible"
4. "Where the River Meets the Sea"
5. "Knockin 'Em Down"
6. "Love in Motion" (feat. Christina Amphlett)
7. "Satellite"
8. "Big Wheel"
9. "Invisible People"
10. "Heaven"
11. "Pas de Trois"
