= Masterfile (album) =

Compilation album by Icehouse
- Released: 16 November 1992
- Recorded: January 1980 – September 1992
- Genre: Rock, new wave
- Length: 67:43
- Label: Alexis; Massive; Aris
- Producer: Cameron Allan, Keith Forsey, Iva Davies, Rhett Davies, Bill Laswell

Icehouse chronology
Code Blue (1990)	Masterfile (1992)	Spin One (1993)

Singles from Masterfile
- 1. "Love in Motion" Released: January 10, 1993

Professional ratings
Review scores
Source	Rating
AllMusic	3/5 stars

Masterfile is the second compilation album by the Australian rock band, Icehouse. The album covers material from the band's first album Icehouse (1980) to Measure for Measure (1986). It also has a re-recorded version of the band's 1981 single, "Love In Motion", with Christina Amphlett of Divinyls.

== Track listing ==
1. "Icehouse" - 4:21
2. "Walls" - 4:22
3. "Sister" - 3:25
4. "We Can Get Together" - 3:46
5. "Can't Help Myself" - 3:12
6. "Great Southern Land" - 5:21
7. "Street Cafe" - 4:14
8. "Hey Little Girl" - 4:24
9. "Dusty Pages" - 4:49
10. "Don't Believe Anymore" - 5:16
11. "Taking The Town" - 3:32
12. "Mr. Big" - 3:32
13. "Baby, You're So Strange" - 3:57
14. "No Promises" - 4:40
15. "Cross The Border" - 4:00
16. "Love in Motion" (feat. Christina Amphlett) - 4:45

=== Bonus tracks on Australian release ===
1. "Crazy" - 4:49
2. "Electric Blue" - 4:33
3. "Man of Colours" - 5:11

=== Bonus tracks on Japanese release ===
1. "Byrralku Dhangudha" (feat. Buckethead)

== Personnel ==
Credits:

- Buckethead - guitar ("Byrralku Dhangudha")
- Christina Amphlett - vocal ("Love in Motion")
- Iva Davies - bass guitar, guitar, keyboards, programming, vocals, fairlight, linn drum
- Brian Eno - keyboards, vocals
- Keith Forsey - percussion
- Michael Hoste - keyboards
- Steve Jansen - drums
- Bob Kretschmer - guitar
- John Lloyd - drums
- Simon Lloyd - brass, reeds, overdubs
- David Lord - keyboards
- Guy Pratt - bass guitar
- Andy Qunta - keyboards, vocals
- Anthony Smith - keyboards
- Masaki Tanasawa - drums
- Keith Welsh - bass guitar

== Charts ==
Chart (1992)	Peak position
Australian Albums (ARIA)	25

== Certifications ==
Region	Certification	Certified units/sales
Australia (ARIA)	Platinum	70,000^{^}
^{^} Shipments figures based on certification alone.
