= Great Southern Land (album) =

Compilation album by Icehouse
- Released: 23 October 1989
- Genres: Rock; new wave; synth-pop
- Labels: Regular; Chrysalis

Icehouse chronology
Man of Colours (1987)	Great Southern Land (1989)	Code Blue (1990)

Singles from Great Southern Land
- 1. "Touch the Fire" Released: 30 September 1989; 2. "Jimmy Dean" Released: 28 December 1989

Great Southern Land is the first compilation album by the Australian rock band Icehouse, released by Chrysalis Records and Regular Records in October 1989. It peaked at No. 2 on the Australian albums charts, and contained two new singles "Touch the Fire", which peaked at No. 13 on the singles chart, and "Jimmy Dean", which peaked at No. 47. Several different versions of this album exist.

The Regular Records release for Australian / New Zealand markets was as a 16 track double vinyl LP, twin music cassette or CD, and did not include any songs from the previous Icehouse album Man of Colours which had reached No. 1 in both countries.

Internationally Chrysalis Records US versions were as 10 track LP / music cassette or 11 track CD release with a different tracks such as "Crazy" and "Electric Blue" and track order; Chrysalis Records UK versions had 12 tracks (some not included on original Australian release); and a video version of 15 tracks was released in VHS PAL format.

Per the album liner notes a number of songs are new remixed versions made at Sigma Sound Studios in New York by Steve Thompson & Michael Barbiero being "Great Southern Land", "Sister", "We Can Get Together" and "Walls". This duo also mixed the new songs "Touch The Fire" and "Jimmy Dean" at Bearsville Studios. Some of the Chrysalis album releases include the 1986 extended version of "No Promises" mixed by Thompson and Barbiero.

== Track listing ==
All tracks are written by Iva Davies, except where noted.

Australian/New Zealand release
No.	Title	Original Album	Length
1.	"Touch the Fire"	previously unreleased	3:50
2.	"Can't Help Myself"	Icehouse	3:43
3.	"Hey Little Girl"	Primitive Man	4:23
4.	"Great Southern Land"	Primitive Man	5:22
5.	"Paradise"	Measure for Measure	4:45
6.	"Sister" (Davies, Michael Hoste)	Icehouse	3:24
7.	"No Promises" (Davies, Robert Kretschmer)	Measure for Measure	4:42
8.	"Jimmy Dean" (Davies, Kretschmer)	previously unreleased	4:02
9.	"Cross the Border" (Davies, Kretschmer)	Measure for Measure	3:57
10.	"Street Cafe"	Primitive Man	4:12
11.	"Love in Motion"	Standalone Single	3:41
12.	"Walls"	Icehouse	4:23
13.	"Baby, You're So Strange" (Davies, Kretschmer)	Measure for Measure	4:00
14.	"We Can Get Together"	Icehouse	3:48
15.	"Mr. Big" (Davies, Kretschmer)	Measure for Measure	3:47
16.	"Don't Believe Anymore"	Sidewalk	5:16

American release
No.	Title	Original Album	Length
1.	"Touch the Fire"	previously unreleased	3:45
2.	"Jimmy Dean" (Davies, Kretschmer)	previously unreleased	4:02
3.	"Hey Little Girl"	Primitive Man	4:21
4.	"Can't Help Myself"	Icehouse	3:40
5.	"Great Southern Land"	Primitive Man	5:20
6.	"Sister" (Davies, Michael Hoste)	Icehouse	3:24
7.	"Cross the Border" (Davies, Kretschmer)	Measure for Measure	3:57
8.	"We Can Get Together"	Icehouse	3:48
9.	"Street Cafe"	Primitive Man	4:12
10.	"Don't Believe Anymore"	Sidewalk	5:16
11.	"No Promises (12" Dance Mix)" (Davies, Robert Kretschmer)	Measure for Measure	8:48

- "No Promises" (12" Dance Mix) only released on CD version, not Cassette.

=== Track listing ===
UK/Europe release
No.	Title	Original Album	Length
1.	"Touch the Fire"	previously unreleased	3:45
2.	"Jimmy Dean" (Davies, Kretschmer)	previously unreleased	4:02
3.	"Hey Little Girl"	Primitive Man	4:21
4.	"Great Southern Land"	Primitive Man	5:20
5.	"Electric Blue" (Davies, John Oates)	Man of Colours	4:21
6.	"Crazy" (Davies, Robert Kretschmer, Andy Qunta)	Man of Colours	3:24
7.	"Cross the Border" (Davies, Kretschmer)	Measure for Measure	3:57
8.	"Street Cafe"	Primitive Man	4:12
9.	"Don't Believe Anymore"	Sidewalk	5:16
10.	"No Promises (12" Dance Mix)" (Davies, Robert Kretschmer)	Measure for Measure	8:48
11.	"Sister" (Davies, Michael Hoste)	Icehouse	3:24
12.	"Icehouse"	Icehouse	4:10

- "Sister" & "Icehouse" only released on CD version, not Cassette.

=== Video release ===
1. "Can't Help Myself"
2. "We Can Get Together"
3. "Walls"
4. "Sister"
5. "Love in Motion"
6. "Great Southern Land '82"
7. "Hey Little Girl"
8. "Street Cafe"
9. "Don't Believe Anymore"
10. "No Promises"
11. "Baby, You're So Strange"
12. "Mr. Big"
13. "Cross the Border"
14. "Touch the Fire"
15. "Great Southern Land '89"
- Released in VHS/PAL format.

== Personnel ==
Icehouse members

- Iva Davies — vocals, guitars, keyboards
- Robert Kretschmer — guitar
- Simon Lloyd — saxophone, keyboards
- Stephen Morgan — bass guitar
- Paul Wheeler — drums

Art work

- Cover photography — Hugh McLeod-Aitionn
- Cover artwork — Hugh McLeod-Aitionn
- Band photos —Jan Moxley & Tony Mott

== Charts ==
Chart (1989–1990)	Peak position
Australian Albums (ARIA)	2
New Zealand Albums (RMNZ)	5

== Certifications ==
Region	Certification	Certified units/sales
Australia (ARIA)	2× Platinum	140,000^{^}
New Zealand (RMNZ)	Platinum	15,000^{^}
^{^} Shipments figures based on certification alone.
