= Meltdown (Icehouse album) =

Remix album by Icehouse
- Released: 29 October 2002
- Genre: Rock; electronica; techno
- Label: dIVA/Warner
- Producer: Steve Millard

Icehouse chronology
| No Promises (1997) | Meltdown (2002) | Heroes (2004) |

Singles from Meltdown
- 1. "Lay Your Hands on Me" Released: August 2002

Street Cafe
- 2004 release (Rock Up Records)

Professional ratings
Review scores
| Source | Rating |
|---|---|
| AllMusic | 2/5 stars |

Meltdown is a remix album by Australian rock synthpop band, Icehouse with tracks remixed by Australian electronic musicians and bands including Infusion, sonicanimation and beXta. It was released in October 2002 within Australia by dIVA Records (Icehouse founder Iva Davies' own label) under Warner Music Australia. The single "Lay Your Hands on Me" (Icehouse Vs. Speed of Light) peaked at number 85 on the Australian singles chart.

The album was re-released, in 2004 by Rock Up label / Star Records, as Street Cafe or more fully Street Cafe and Other Remixed Hits with a slightly different track order and different cover art (see infobox below right).

== Track listing ==
Meltdown 2002 release

1. "Don't Believe Anymore (Cafe Latte Mix)" (Ivan Gough of TV Rock and Colin Snape of The Jenifers) – 9:03
2. "Love in Motion" (Wicked Beat Sound System) – 3:38
3. "Hey Little Girl" (Infusion) – 4:48
4. "Street Cafe" (Smash N Grab) – 3:56
5. "Cross the Border" (Sonic Assault Mix Edit) (Funk Corporation) – 4:02
6. "Great Southern Land" (Endorphin) – 4:41
7. "Electric Blue" (Skipraiders) – 4:09
8. "Lay Your Hands on Me" (Icehouse Vs. Speed Of Light) – 3:57
9. "We Can Get Together" (sonicanimation) – 3:56
10. "Can't Help Myself" (beXta) – 4:13
11. "Icehouse" (Pee Wee Ferris & John Ferris) – 5:49
12. "Crazy" (Josh G. Abrahams) – 4:11
13. "No Promises" ([love] tatto) – 6:55
14. "Man of Colours" (Endorphin) – 5:18

Street Cafe 2004 release
[Note: same re-mixers as above]

1. "Street Cafe" – 3:56
2. "Don't Believe Anymore" – 9:03
3. "Love in Motion" – 3:38
4. "Hey Little Girl" – 4:48
5. "Cross the Border" – 4:02
6. "Great Southern Land" – 4:41
7. "Electric Blue" – 4:09
8. "Lay Your Hands on Me" – 3:57
9. "We Can Get Together" – 3:56
10. "Can't Help Myself" – 4:13
11. "Icehouse" – 5:49
12. "Crazy" – 4:11
13. "No Promises" – 6:55
14. "Man of Colours" – 5:18

== Personnel ==
Credited to:

- Josh G. Abrahams – remixing, mixing
- Endorphin – remixing
- Pee Wee Ferris & John Ferris – remixing
- Darren Glen – producer, remixing
- Ivan Gough – remixing
- Infusion – producer, remixing
- Andy J – producer, remixing
- Steve Millard – executive producer
- Kathy Naunton – mastering @ dB Mastering
- Craig Obey – producer, remixing, mixing
- Skipraiders – remixing
- Colin Snape – remixing
- David Solm – photography
- sonicanimation – remixing
- Voice – design and art direction
- Wicked Beat Sound System – remixing

== Charts ==
| Chart (2002) | Peak position |
|---|---|
| Australian Albums (ARIA) | 100 |
