= Love in Motion =

Love in Motion may mean:

- "Love in Motion" (song), a 1981 single by Australian band Icehouse, re-released in 1992
- Love in Motion, a 1983 UK released studio album by Icehouse, a renamed re-release of 1982's Primitive Man
- Love in Motion (1996 Icehouse album)
- Love In Motion (Anika Moa album), 2010
- "Love In Motion", a 2011 song by SebastiAn from Total
