= Great Southern Land (disambiguation) =

Great Southern Land may refer to:

- "Great Southern Land", a colloquial name for Australia
- "Great Southern Land", a song released by the Australian band Icehouse in 1982
- Great Southern Land (album), an album released by Icehouse in 1989
- Great Southern Land (TV series), an Australian TV series co-written and presented by Stephen Simpson
- Great Southern Land Media Group, owners of radio stations on the Sunshine Coast, Queensland

== See also ==
- Terra Australis, meaning "southern land"; name given to a hypothetical continent which appeared on European maps between the 15th and 18th centuries
