= No Promises (Icehouse album) =

Compilation album by Icehouse
- Released: 1997
- Genre: Rock, new wave
- Label: Diva/Massive

Icehouse chronology
| Love in Motion (1996) | No Promises (1997) | Meltdown (2002) |

Professional ratings
Review scores
| Source | Rating |
|---|---|
| Allmusic | 4/5 stars |

No Promises is a compilation album by Australian rock band, Icehouse.

== Track listing ==
1. "Taking The Town"
2. "No Promises"
3. "This Time"
4. "Dusty Pages"
5. "On My Mind"
6. "The Mountain"
7. "Paradise"
8. "Angel Street"
9. "Spanish Gold"
10. "Lucky Me"
11. "Fatman"
12. "Nothing To Do"
