= Spin One =

EP by Icehouse
- Released: June 1993
- Studios: Studios 301 (Sydney), Paradise (Sydney)
- Genres: New wave, synthpop, rock
- Length: 19:29
- Label: Massive
- Producers: Iva Davies, Cameron Allan, Charles Clouser, Bill Laswell

Icehouse chronology
Masterfile (1992)	Spin One (1993)	Big Wheel (1993)

Spin One is a four-track EP released by Australian rock/synthpop band Icehouse in June 1993. It was issued by Massive Records. Three tracks, "Shakin' the Cage", "Dedicated to Glam" and "MLK", are also on the double CD remix album, Full Circle, released in December 1994. "Byrralku Dhangudha" is an edited version of "The Great Southern Mix" with guest appearance by aboriginal performers, keyboardist Bernie Worrell (Parliament-Funkadelic) and avant-garde guitarist Buckethead, and was produced by Bill Laswell.

== Professional reviews ==
Professional ratings
Review scores
Source	Rating
Allmusic	1.5/5 stars

Allmusic's Kelvin Hayes described "Shakin' the Cage" and "MLK", which were taken from Full Circle, as "Semi-decent lead [followed by] a diabolical attempt at trendy house courtesy of General Dynamics, who uses samples over a vapid synth, an experiment best left to self-destruct in the laboratory". While the other two tracks, "are remixes of versions that are included in the "FC" bracket, which doesn't bode much better but does at least offer more than its sibling".

== Track listing ==
1. "Shakin' the Cage" (Andy Qunta, Iva Davies, Robert Kretschmer, Simon Lloyd) – 4:02
2. "Byrralku Dhangudha" (Davies) – 5:25
3. "Dedicated to Glam" (Davies) – 4:29
4. "MLK" (Davies) – 5:33

Songwriters according to Australasian Performing Right Association.

== Personnel ==
Credits:

Icehouse

- Iva Davies – vocals, guitars, keyboards Synclavier II and Fairlight
- Robert Kretschmer – guitars
- Simon Lloyd – saxophone, keyboards, programming
- Andy Qunta – keyboards, piano

Additional musicians

- Buckethead – guitar (track 2)
- Bernie Worrell – keyboards (track 2)

Production work

- Cameron Allan – mixer, producer (tracks 1 and 4)
- Charles Clouser (a.k.a. General Dynamics) – mixer, producer, remixer (tracks 1 and 4)
- Iva Davies – producer
- Bill Laswell – mixer, producer (track 2)
- 808 State – remix (track 3)

All recording and mixing at General Dynamics, Trackdown Studios, Studios 301, FON Studios, Western Boulevard.

== Charts ==
Chart (1993)	Peak position
Australia (ARIA Charts)	112
