= Heroes (Icehouse album) =

Compilation album by Icehouse
- Released: 16 August 2004
- Genre: Rock
- Label: Diva / Warner
- Producer: Iva Davies

Icehouse chronology
Meltdown (2002)	Heroes (2004)	White Heat: 30 Hits (2011)

Singles from Heroes
- 1. "Heroes" Released: 16 August 2004

Heroes is a compilation album by Australian group, Icehouse released in 2004 to coincide with Seven Network's TV broadcast of the Athens Olympic Games. The album is a re-release of the 1995 soundtrack album The Berlin Tapes with two tracks removed and a second mix of "Heroes" added.

== Track listing ==
1. "Heroes" (David Bowie) – 4:29
2. "Loving the Alien" (David Bowie) – 5:34
3. "Sister Europe" (The Psychedelic Furs) – 3:59
4. "Heaven" (Talking Heads) – 4:27
5. "Complicated Game" (XTC) – 5:27
6. "Berlin" (Lou Reed) – 0:49
7. "All the Way" (Frank Sinatra) – 3:16
8. "All Tomorrow's Parties" (The Velvet Underground) – 4:35
9. "Let There Be Love" (Simple Minds) – 4:33
10. "A Really Good Time" (Roxy Music) – 3:23
11. "Love Like Blood" (Killing Joke) – 5:47
12. "Heroes" (The Athens Mix) (David Bowie)

== Charts ==
Chart (2004)	Peak position
Australian (ARIA Charts)	68
