= Masterfile =

Masterfile may refer to:

- Masterfile (album), an album by Icehouse
- MasterFILE, a database provided by EBSCO Information Services
