= White Heat (disambiguation) =

White Heat is a 1949 film starring James Cagney.

White Heat may also refer to:

== Film and television ==
- White Heat (1926 film), a British film directed by Thomas Bentley
- White Heat, a 1934 American film directed by Lois Weber
- White Heat (TV series), a 2012 British television drama series

== Music ==
- White Heat (Dusty Springfield album), 1982
- White Heat: 30 Hits, a 2011 album by Icehouse
- White Heat (Switch album), a 1975 album by R&B group White Heat (a.k.a. Switch)
- "White Heat", song from the 1985 album Mad Not Mad by Madness
- "White Heat", a song from the 1986 album True Blue by Madonna

== Other uses ==
- White Heat (book), a 1990 cookbook by chef Marco Pierre White
- White heat, used to estimate an object's temperature from the color of incandescence: see red heat

== See also ==
- White Light/White Heat, a 1968 album by the Velvet Underground
  - "White Light/White Heat" (song), by the Velvet Underground
- "White Heat, Red Hot", a song by Judas Priest from Stained Class
- White heat of technology, a phrase coined by UK Prime Minister Harold Wilson about the effects of technology
