= Fresco EP =

Fresco

EP by Icehouse
- Released: 1983
- Studios: Paradise Studios - Sydney, Westlake Audio - Eldorado, and Musicland West Studios - Los Angeles
- Genres: New wave, synthpop
- Label: Chrysalis
- Producers: Iva Davies, Keith Forsey

Icehouse chronology
Primitive Man (1982)	Fresco (1983)	Sidewalk (1984)

Professional ratings
Review scores
Source	Rating
Allmusic	2.5/5 stars

Fresco is an early 1983 Mini Album released by Australian rock/synthpop band, Icehouse. It contains the same versions of "Hey Little Girl", "Street Cafe" and "Glam" from their 1982 album Primitive Man together with different versions of "Break These Chains" and "Over the Line" (B-side of "Street Cafe" single). It was produced by Icehouse founder Iva Davies together with Keith Forsey for Chrysalis Records.

"Break These Chains" appeared in the 1986 film Car Trouble and included on the related Car Trouble: The Original Soundtrack album.

== Track listing ==
All tracks were written by Iva Davies.

A Side

1. "Break These Chains" - 3:40
2. "Hey Little Girl" - 3:38
3. "Over the Line" - 2:45

B Side

1. "Street Cafe" - 4:11
2. "Glam" - 3:18

== Credits ==
Art

- Cover Illustration: Geoffrey Gifford
- Cover Design: Gillian Titus
