= Tony Llewellyn =

Australian musician

Tony Llewellyn is an Australian musician. He signed with WEA and released an album, The News in 1989. Llewellyn was the keyboard player in Icehouse from 1991 until 2004.

His single "Pick You Up" was engineered by Guy Gray and he was nomination for the 1989 ARIA Music Award for Engineer of the Year for that single and three other releases.

His daughters Aria and Cassie were born in (Cassie) 2013 and (Aria) 2015.

== Discography ==
=== Albums ===
List of albums, with release date and label shown
Title	Album details	Peak chart positions
Title	Album details	AUS
The News	Released: November 1989; Label: WEA (254727-1); Formats: LP, CD, Cassette	135

=== Singles ===
Title	Year	Peak chart positions	Album
Title	Year	AUS	Album
"Pick You Up"	1988	-	The News
"Right One for Me"	1989	164	The News
"Heart of America"	1989	153	The News

== Awards and nominations ==
=== ARIA Music Awards ===
The ARIA Music Awards are a set of annual ceremonies presented by Australian Recording Industry Association (ARIA), which recognise excellence, innovation, and achievement across all genres of the music of Australia. They commenced in 1987.

Year	Nominee / work	Award	Result	Ref.
1989	Guy Gray for "Pick You Up"	Engineer of the Year	Nominated	
