= Code Blue (album) =

Studio album by Icehouse
- Released: 11 November 1990
- Studios: Trackdown and Rhinoceros, Sydney, Australia
- Length: 51:38
- Label: Regular
- Producer: Nick Launay

Icehouse chronology
Great Southern Land (1989)	Code Blue (1990)	Masterfile (1992)

Singles from Code Blue
- 1. "Big Fun" Released: 23 July 1990; 2. "Miss Divine" Released: 28 August 1990; 3. "Anything Is Possible" Released: 9 December 1990; 4. "Where the River Meets the Sea" Released: 8 April 1991

Professional ratings
Review scores
Source	Rating
AllMusic	1.5/5 stars

Code Blue is the sixth studio album by the Australian rock band Icehouse and was released in November 1990 by Regular Records in Australia and New Zealand. Code Blue peaked at #5 on the Australian album ARIA Charts. Each of the songs were result of Icehouse songwriter Iva Davies search for unknown stories of Australians. Instrumentally, Code Blue was more guitar heavy than the previous studio album Man of Colours, partly due to the influence of the album's producer, Nick Launay.

== Track listing ==
All songs written by Iva Davies and Robert Kretschmer except where noted. Songwriters according to Australasian Performing Right Association (APRA).

No.	Title	Writer(s)	Length
1.	"Mercy On The Boy"		3:46
2.	"Harbour Town"	Davies	3:38
3.	"The Great Divide"	Davies	4:39
4.	"Wind And Sail"		5:08
5.	"Big Fun"		4:00
6.	"Miss Divine"		4:20
7.	"Knockin' 'Em Down"	Davies	3:46
8.	"Miracle Mile"		4:40
9.	"Anything Is Possible"		4:21
10.	"Where The River Meets The Sea"		4:08
11.	"Jericho Bay"	Davies, Simon Lloyd	4:06
12.	"Charlie's Sky"	Davies	5:00

2002 & 2012 remastered bonus tracks
No.	Title	Length
13.	"Big Fun (The Riddler Mix)"	6:22
14.	"Miss Divine (The Spellbound Mix)"	6:39
15.	"Where The River Meets The Sea (Demo)"	4:05

== Personnel ==
Credited to:

Icehouse members

- Iva Davies – vocals, guitars, keyboards, Synclavier, oboe, bagpipes
- Simon Lloyd – saxophone, keyboards, programming
- Stephen Morgan – bass
- Paul Wheeler – drums

Additional musicians

- Mark Azzopardi – backing vocals
- Mary Azzopardi – backing vocals
- Kevin Bennett – backing vocals
- Robert Burke – saxophone
- The Cove Chamber Orchestra — strings
- Sandy Evans – saxophone
- Sean Kelly – backing vocals
- Wendy Matthews – backing vocals
- James Morrison – trumpet
- Mark Punch – backing vocals
- James Valentine – saxophone

Recording details

- Studio/s: Trackdown and Rhinoceros Studios, Rich and EMI Studios 301 Sydney
- Arranger (brass, strings) – Iva Davies
- Engineer – Nick Launay
  - Assistants – James Cadsky, Nich Hartley, Peter Lees, Adrian Webb, Kristen Wolek
- Mastered – Tony Cousins @ The Town House, London, England.
- Mixed – Nick Launay, Iva Davies (bonus tracks)
- Producer – Nick Launay, Iva Davies (bonus tracks)
- Digital remastering (2002) – Iva Davies, Ryan Scott

Art work

- Cover Concept – Iva Davies
- Art Director – David Barnes
- Photography – Hugh Stewart

== Charts ==
Chart (1990)	Peak position
Australian Albums (ARIA)	7
New Zealand Albums (RMNZ)	7

== Certifications ==
Region	Certification	Certified units/sales
Australia (ARIA)	Platinum	70,000^{^}
^{^} Shipments figures based on certification alone.
