= We Can Get Together =

- 1980 Australian release (Regular Records)

Single by Flowers

from the album Icehouse
- B-side: "Paradise Lost"
- Released: September 1980
- Genre: New wave
- Length: 3:37
- Label: Regular; Chrysalis
- Songwriter: Iva Davies
- Producers: Cameron Allan; Iva Davies

Flowers singles chronology
"Can't Help Myself" (1980)	"We Can Get Together" (1980)	"Walls" (1981)

"We Can Get Together" alternative cover
- Chrysalis Records (1981 UK release)

"We Can Get Together" alternative cover
- Chrysalis Records (1981 US 7" release)

"We Can Get Together" is the second single released by the Australian rock band Flowers, later known as Icehouse. It was released in September 1980, on the independent label Regular Records from their first album, Icehouse, two weeks before the album itself was released. It peaked at #16 on the Australian Kent Music Report Singles Charts.

Following their signing with Chrysalis Records in early 1981 for the European, Japanese, UK and US releases Flowers had to change their name due to legal restrictions preventing confusion with a Scottish group The Flowers. They also remixed the Icehouse album. from this album was released in the UK on Chrysalis in 1981 under the band name Icehouse as both a 7" and 10" vinyl single and later in the US as a 7" single.

The 1989 Icehouse compilation album Great Southern Land includes a remixed version of "We Can Get Together" by Steve Thompson & Michael Barbiero. Another remix version by sonicanimation was released on the Icehouse album Meltdown in 2002.

This Song was Covered In 2006 By Australian EDM Group Celebrity Drug Disasters.

== Reception ==
In a single review Cash Box magazine said the group "can sound an awful lot like Television's Tom Verlaine at times here or an upbeat Gary Numan."

== Track listing ==
All tracks written by Iva Davies unless otherwise shown.

=== 7" single (Australian release) ===
1. "We Can Get Together" - 3:37
2. "Paradise Lost" - 5:54

=== 7" single (UK release) ===
1. "We Can Get Together"
2. "Send Somebody" (Iva Davies, Michael Hoste)

=== 10" single (UK release) ===
1. "We Can Get Together"
2. "Send Somebody" (Iva Davies, Michael Hoste)
3. "Paradise Lost"

=== 7" single (US release) ===
1. "We Can Get Together"
2. "Not My Kind"

=== 7" single (Europe release) ===
1. "We Can Get Together" (Edit)
2. "Icehouse"

== Charts ==
=== Weekly charts ===
Weekly chart performance for "We Can Get Together"
Chart (1980)	Peak position
Australia (Kent Music Report)	16
New Zealand (Recorded Music NZ)	36
US Billboard Hot 100	62

=== Year-end charts ===
Year-end chart performance for "We Can Get Together"
Chart (1980)	Position
Australia (Kent Music Report)	89
