= Paul Gildea =

- Gildea in 2017

Background information
- Born: November 1957 (age 68–69); Coburg, Victoria, Australia
- Occupations: Musician, music educator, talent manager
- Member of: Icehouse
- Formerly of: Little River Band
- Website: pgam.com.au

Paul Gildea (born November 1957) is an Australian musician, music educator and talent manager. He is best known as the guitarist and backing vocalist for the band Icehouse.

== Early life ==
Gildea was born in Coburg, Victoria on 30 November 1957, one of four children. He initially wanted to play drums, but received his first guitar at age 12. He completed his secondary education at Melbourne High School and went on to complete a Bachelor of Business degree majoring in Sociology.

== Musician ==
Gildea played in numerous bands from age 15. In 1990 Gildea was invited to join Icehouse to replace Bob Kretschmer. He took a break from the band in 2004, rejoining in 2007.

From 1998 to 2000, Gildea was also a touring member of Little River Band, replacing Peter Beckett. That was the last occasion that Little River Band would consist entirely of Australian members.

Gildea was also the lead guitarist for James Reyne, Vika and Linda Bull and Rick Price.

== Music educator ==
Gildea is the Academic Course Manager in the Bachelor of Applied Business in Music Industry course at Box Hill Institute.

He was previously the Senior Coordinator, Entertainment & Arts Management at the Melbourne campus of the Australian Institute of Music.

== Talent manager ==
Through his company Paul Gildea Artist Management, Gildea is the manager of sisters' band Stonefield and The Voice finalist and current Icehouse band member Michael Paynter. Gildea previously managed defunct band Motor Ace.
