= Icehouse (album) =

- 1980 Australian release (Regular Records)

Studio album by Flowers
- Released: 10 October 1980
- Recorded: January 1980
- Studios: Studios 301 (Sydney), Paradise (Sydney)
- Genre: New wave
- Length: 41:50; 37:24
- Labels: Regular; Chrysalis; Warner Music
- Producers: Cameron Allan; Iva Davies

Flowers chronology
Icehouse (1980)	Primitive Man (1982)

Singles from Icehouse
- 1. "Can't Help Myself" Released: 13 May 1980; 2. "We Can Get Together" Released: September 1980; 3. "Walls" Released: January 1981; 4. "Icehouse" Released: June 1981 (US only)

Icehouse
- 1981 UK/US release (Chrysalis Records)

Professional ratings
Review scores
Source	Rating
AllMusic (1980)	3.5/5 stars
AllMusic (1981)	4/5 stars
Smash Hits	8/10

Icehouse is the debut studio album released by the Australian rock synth-pop band Flowers, later known as Icehouse, on the independent label Regular Records in October 1980. The title and the artist are sometimes incorrectly swapped, because the band changed their name from Flowers to Icehouse after this album was released.

Containing the Top 20 Australian hits "Can't Help Myself", "We Can Get Together" and "Walls"; the album made heavy use of synthesisers, which would continue to be used throughout the band's career. Founder Iva Davies wrote all the tracks including four co-written with keyboardist Michael Hoste; Hoste was replaced during recording sessions by Anthony Smith.

The 1981 international release of the album (i.e. Icehouse by Icehouse) has different cover artwork and was given a new remix by Davies and American recording engineer Ed Thacker. The track "Nothing To Do" was not included.

The Flowers album version of "Can't Help Myself" is unique to the original Regular Records vinyl and cassette releases, with all subsequent CD and vinyl re-issues having the more familiar 7" single mix (or close variants thereof).

The original Flowers album was included in the 2010 book 100 Best Australian Albums.

The song "Icehouse" forms part of the narrative of the 2023 autofiction/horror novel The Shards by American author Bret Easton Ellis, and is used in The Shards (TV series) episode four which first-aired in 2026.

== Track listing ==
All songs written by Iva Davies, except where noted.

1980 Original release
No.	Title	Writer(s)	Length
1.	"Icehouse"		4:22
2.	"We Can Get Together"		3:46
3.	"Fatman"		3:53
4.	"Sister"	Iva Davies, Michael Hoste	3:22
5.	"Walls"		4:22
6.	"Can't Help Myself"		4:41
7.	"Skin"	Davies, Hoste	2:41
8.	"Sons"		4:32
9.	"Boulevarde"	Davies, Hoste	3:14
10.	"Nothing to Do"	Davies, Hoste	3:22
11.	"Not My Kind"		3:35

1987 CD reissue bonus tracks
No.	Title	Writer(s)	Length
12.	"Send Somebody" (B-side to "Can't Help Myself")	Davies, Hoste	3:42
13.	"All the Way" (B-side to "Walls")		3:50
14.	"Paradise Lost" (Instrumental - B-side to "We Can Get Together")		5:53

2002 CD remaster bonus tracks
No.	Title	Length
15.	"Love in Motion" (Original Single Mix)	3:41
16.	"Goodnight Mr. Matthews" (B-side to "Love in Motion")	4:21
17.	"Can't Help Myself" (Original 10" Mix)	3:41

1981 UK/US release
No.	Title	Writer(s)	Length
1.	"Icehouse"		4:13
2.	"Can't Help Myself"		3:52
3.	"Sister"	Iva Davies, Michael Hoste	3:28
4.	"Walls"		4:02
5.	"Sons"		4:35
6.	"We Can Get Together"		3:41
7.	"Boulevarde"	Iva Davies, Michael Hoste	3:17
8.	"Fatman"		3:52
9.	"Skin"	Iva Davies, Michael Hoste	2:47
10.	"Not My Kind"		3:36

2011 30th Anniversary Edition (Disc 2)
No.	Title	Writer(s)	Length
1.	"Boulevarde"		3:20
2.	"Funtime"	David Bowie, Iggy Pop	2:27
3.	"Man Who Dies Every Day"	Warren Cann, Chris Cross, Billy Currie, John Foxx, Stevie Shears	3:54
4.	"Fatman"		3:52
5.	"Sorry"	Stevie Wright, George Young	3:08
6.	"Cold Turkey"	John Lennon	4:13
7.	"We Can Get Together"		3:53
8.	"Nothing to Do"		3:24
9.	"Icehouse"		4:50
10.	"Send Somebody"		3:33
11.	"Sons"		4:52
12.	"Skin"		2:53
13.	"Walls"		4:49
14.	"All the Way"		4:05
15.	"Goodnight Mr. Matthews"		3:43
16.	"Love in Motion"		4:02
17.	"Not My Kind"		3:43
18.	"Sister"		3:30
19.	"Can't Help Myself"		6:57

== Personnel ==
Icehouse members

- Iva Davies – vocals; guitar; oboe; keyboards
- Michael Hoste – keyboards; piano on "Sons" (replaced by Smith during recording sessions)
- John Lloyd – drums; backing vocals
- Anthony Smith – keyboards; backing vocals
- Keith Welsh – bass guitar; backing vocals

Additional musicians

- Ian Moss – guitar on "Skin"
- Geoff Oakes – saxophone on "Sons"
- James SK Wān – bamboo flute

Production team

- Producer: Cameron Allan, Iva Davies
- Engineer: John Bee, David Cafe, Gerry Nixon
- Studios: Studios 301 except "Can't Help Myself" and "Send Somebody", recorded at Paradise Studios.
- Mastering: David Hemming, Rick O'Neil
- Digital remastering (2002): Iva Davies, Scott Ryan, Tim Ryan
- Cover art: John Lloyd
- Inside art: Geoff Gifford
- Photography: Grant Matthews

== Charts ==
=== Weekly charts ===
Chart (1980/81)	Peak position
Australian (Kent Music Report)	4
New Zealand Albums (RMNZ)	2
US Billboard 200	82

=== Year-end charts ===
Chart (1981)	Peak position
Australia (Kent Music Report)	6
New Zealand Albums (RMNZ)	4
Chart (1982)	Position
New Zealand Albums (RMNZ)	37

== Certifications ==
Region	Certification	Certified units/sales
Australia (ARIA)	4× Platinum	200,000^{^}
New Zealand (RMNZ)	4× Platinum	60,000^{^}
^{^} Shipments figures based on certification alone.
