= Full Circle (Icehouse album) =

Remix album by Icehouse
- Released: December 1994
- Studio: Studios 301 (Sydney), Paradise (Sydney)
- Genre: Rock; new wave; electronica
- Length: 91:02
- Label: Massive
- Producer: Iva Davies/Various

Icehouse chronology
Big Wheel (1993)	Full Circle (1994)	The Berlin Tapes (1995)

Full Circle is the first remix album by Australian rock/synthpop band Icehouse released in December 1994 on Massive Records. It also features a variety of musicians including the Bangarra Dance Company, Elcho Island and guitar virtuoso, Buckethead who would later join Guns N' Roses.

Disc 1 is subtitled The Revolution Mixes and disc 2 is The Time & Motion Mixes; tracks "Shakin' the Cage", "MLK" and "Dedicated to Glam" as well as an edited version of "The Great Southern Mix" had been released in June 1993 on the Spin One EP. "Desdemona" is a cover version of the John's Children single, composed Marc Bolan. (later of T. Rex). The track "Wild" is listed on the 1996 film Space Jam credits.

== Track listing ==
=== Disc 1: The Revolution Mixes ===
1. "Shakin' the Cage" (Techno)
2. "Colours"
3. "Desdemona"
4. "Mercy"
5. "Yo, Micro Babe"
6. "MLK"
7. "She Comes"
8. "Wild"
9. "Dedicated to Glam"

=== Disc 2: The Time & Motion Mixes ===
1. "Melt Steel (Part 1)"
2. "Slow Motion"
3. "Kilimanjaro"
4. "Melt Steel (Part 2)"
5. "Blue Noise"
6. "The Great Southern Mix"
7. "Melt Steel (Part 3)"
- "Melt Steel" contains segments of an interview with Marc Bolan.

== Personnel ==
Credited to:

- Cameron Allan – producer, mixing
- Christina Amphlett – vocals
- Jenny Andrews – vocals
- Marc Bolan – interviewer, dialogue
- Buckethead – guitar
- Charles Clouser – producer, mixing
- Iva Davies – producer, engineer, performer, mixing
- 808 State – remixing
- Alan Fisch – engineer
- Oz Fritz – engineer
- Mark Gamble – producer, mixing
- Ray Hearn – project supervisor
- Jon Ingoldsby – guitar
- Bill Laswell – bass, guitar (bass), producer, mixing, basic track
- Simon Leadley – engineer, editing, mastering, mixing
- Banula Marika – vocals, clapping sticks
- Don Murray – didgeridoo
- Steven Page – coordination
- Bernie Worrell – keyboards
- Yassa – rap

All recording and mixing at General Dynamics, Trackdown Studios, Studios 301, FON Studios, Western Boulevarde.
