= Boxes (Sydney Dance Company album) =

Soundtrack album by Sydney Dance Company with Iva Davies
- Released: 1 November 1985
- Recorded: Trash Studios, Sydney, Australia
- Genres: Synthpop, new wave
- Label: Festival/Chrysalis
- Producers: Iva Davies; Bob Kretschmer

Sydney Dance Company albums chronology
Sidewalk (1984)	Boxes (1985)	Measure for Measure (1986)

Boxes is a soundtrack album credited to Sydney Dance Company with Iva Davies, released by Festival Records / Chrysalis Records in November 1985. The work was originally conceived by its composers, Iva Davies and Robert Kretschmer, in collaboration with choreographer Graeme Murphy of the Sydney Dance Company for performance as the ballet Boxes. The first live performance of Boxes was given by the Sydney Dance Company together with Davies and Kretschmer of Icehouse and guest percussionist Masaki Tanazawa in the Opera Theatre of the Sydney Opera House on 7 November 1985.

== Track listing ==
All music written by Iva Davies and Bob Kretschmer

No.	Title	Length
1.	"Early Images"	3:48
2.	"Terra Incognita"	1:47
3.	"Solitaire"	4:22
4.	"A Break in the Clouds"	4:15
5.	"Love Dance"	2:57
6.	"No Promises"	6:03
7.	"The Tempest - Part 1"	2:21
8.	"The Tempest - Part 2"	2:27
9.	"Gravity"	1:41
10.	"Indian Summer"	3:46
11.	"Russian Dolls"	5:14
12.	"Regular Boys"	2:38
13.	"Familiar Winds"	2:02
14.	"The Walker"	1:25
15.	"No Promises (Reprise)"	1:22
16.	"Surgery"	2:36
17.	"Regular Boys (Reprise)"	3:17
18.	"Labyrinth - Part 1"	1:21
19.	"Labyrinth - Part 2"	1:00
20.	"Liberation - Part 1"	1:24
21.	"Liberation - Part 2"	1:55

== Personnel ==
Credits:

- Music: Iva Davies, Bob Kretschmer, Masaki Tanazawa
- Studio/s: Trash Studios, Sydney, Australia
- Mix: Warne Livesey @ Crescent Studios, Bath, England.
- Producer/s: Iva Davies and Bob Kretschmer
