= Love in Motion (song) =

- 1981 Australian 7" release

Single by Icehouse
- B-side: "Goodnight, Mr. Matthews"
- Released: October 1981
- Recorded: July 1981
- Studio: London
- Genre: Synthpop; new wave
- Length: 3:41 (1981) 4:45 (1992) 3:29 (1992 edit)
- Label: Regular
- Songwriter: Iva Davies
- Producers: Steve Nye; Iva Davies

Icehouse singles chronology
"Icehouse" (1981)	"Love in Motion" (1981)	"Great Southern Land" (1982)

"Love in Motion" is the first release by the Australian rock synthpop band Icehouse following their name change from Flowers. The song was issued as a 7" vinyl single-only in October 1981 on Regular Records for the Australian market. "Love in Motion" peaked at #10 on the Australian singles charts.

Both tracks of the single were written by Icehouse founder and mainstay Iva Davies who recorded the tracks while Icehouse were on tour in London using the Sequential Circuits Prophet-5, and produced them with Steve Nye(who was at the time recording theTin Drum album with the band Japan).

In an interview in Roadrunner magazine in November 1981, Davies stated "Love in Motion" was initially intended as a B-side to "Goodnight, Mr. Matthews", but the song turned out so well consideration was then given to a double-A single release.

== Re-releases ==
A new version of "Goodnight, Mr. Matthews" was included on the 1982 Icehouse album Primitive Man. Some editions of the Primitive Man album internationally (via Chrysalis Records) also contained a new version of "Love in Motion". In 1983 this version of the song also became the album's title track when it was re-released as Love in Motion. In Europe this new version of "Love in Motion" was the b-side to the successful "Hey Little Girl" single.

In 1992 Icehouse released a four-track CD (see Track listing below) that included two new versions of "Love in Motion" with lead vocals by Chrissy Amphlett of Australian band Divinyls. The longer 4:48 edit version also appears on the Icehouse compilation albums Masterfile and White Heat. A third 6:13 version with Amphlett titled "Slow Motion" was included on the 1994 Icehouse remix album Full Circle.The 1992 four-track CD also included a new mix ('7" with Lenin version') of the original 1981 single by Guy Pratt.

An Icehouse compilation album titled Love in Motion was released in 1996 and includes the original 1981 single version of the song.

A remix of "Love in Motion" by Wicked Beat Sound System was included on the Icehouse album Meltdown in 2002.

== Reception ==
Reviewing the 1992 remix at the time of release, Juke said, "Hasn't the 80s electroglam, glum, soft rock sound dated badly? Old Iva, self-proclaimed reclusive genius, has decided to revamp and rerelease this 1981 hit. The tragedy is retro radio will probably gobble it up.

== Track listing ==
All tracks written by Iva Davies.

=== 1981 single (Australian/NZ release) ===
1. "Love in Motion" - 3:41
2. "Goodnight, Mr. Matthews" - 4:00

=== 1992 single (featuring Christina Amphlett) ===
1. "Love in Motion" (single edit) - 3:29
2. "Love in Motion" (7" with Lenin version) - 4:12
3. "Crazy" (original version) - 3:23
4. "Love in Motion" (original Laswell version) 4:48

== Charts ==
=== Weekly charts ===
Weekly chart performance for "Love in Motion"
Chart (1981)	Peak Position
Australian (Kent Music Report)	10
New Zealand (Recorded Music NZ)	35

=== Year-end charts ===
Year-end chart performance for "Love in Motion"
Chart (1981)	Position
Australia (Kent Music Report)	96
