= Big Wheel (Icehouse album) =

Studio album by Icehouse
- Released: 25 October 1993
- Recorded: DIVA Studios, Whale Beach, Australia
- Genre: Rock
- Length: 49:17
- Label: dIVA/Massive
- Producer: Iva Davies

Icehouse chronology
Spin One (1993)	Big Wheel (1993)	Full Circle (1994)

Singles from Big Wheel
- 1. "Satellite" Released: September 1993; 2. "Big Wheel" Released: October 1993; 3. "Invisible People" Released: April 1994

Professional ratings
Review scores
Source	Rating
AllMusic	4.5/5 stars

Big Wheel is the seventh and final studio album by the Australian rock synthpop band, Icehouse, released on 25 October 1993 in Australia by dIVA Records – founder Iva Davies' own label – and Massive Records. It was recorded at Davies' home in Whale Beach during 1993 with Davies on vocals, guitar, bass guitar and keyboards, David Chapman on guitar, keyboards and backing vocals, and Paul Wheeler on drums, percussion and backing vocals. Big Wheel peaked at #44 and was their first studio album not to reach the top ten on the Australian albums chart. The album was digitally remastered by Davies and Ryan Scott with five bonus tracks added for the 2002 re-release by Warner Music Australia.

== Reception ==
Reviewed in Rolling Stone Australia at the time of release, Big Wheel was described as tougher-sounding and less commercial than the band's previous releases, and arguably their best recording to date. The reviewer noted the "early-Seventies glam and Enoesque atmospherics" and praised the "sonic immediacy" of the "largely live performances".

== Track listing ==
All songs written by Iva Davies, David Chapman and Paul Wheeler except where noted. Songwriters according to Australasian Performing Right Association (APRA).

No.	Title	Writer(s)	Length
1.	"Big Wheel"	Iva Davies, David Chapman	4:28
2.	"Satellite"		4:19
3.	"Goodbye, Valentine"	Davies, Simon Lloyd, Wheeler	4:07
4.	"Judas"		5:20
5.	"Invisible People"		6:10
6.	"Feed the Machine"		5:33
7.	"Cadillac"		4:05
8.	"Sam the Man"		3:55
9.	"Stolen Guitar"		4:24
10.	"The System"		6:56
Total length:			49:17

2002 remaster bonus tracks
No.	Title	Writer(s)	Length
11.	"Orbital Line"		4:39
12.	"Turn It Round"	Davies	2:55
13.	"Driving Me Backwards" (live)	Brian Eno	5:54
14.	"Blank Frank" (live)	Eno, Robert Fripp	3:37
15.	"Satellite" (The Ex-static Mix)		5:27

== Personnel ==
Credited to:

=== Icehouse ===
- Iva Davies – vocals, guitar, bass guitar, keyboards, Synclavier II and Fairlight
- David Chapman – guitar, keyboards, backing vocals
- Paul Wheeler – drums, percussion, backing vocals.

=== Additional musicians ===
- Ben Nightingale – guitar on "Sam the Man".

=== Production ===
- Producer – Iva Davies
- Studios – dIVA Studios at Whale Beach, Australia. Additional recordings by Simon Leadley at Trackdown Studios assisted by James Cadsky, Richard Mould, Michelle Barry.
- Mix, editing and mastering – David Lord with Iva Davies, David Chapman, Paul Wheeler at Trackdown
- Mix, editing and mastering engineered by Simon Leadley at Trackdown.

=== Design ===
- Cover concept – Iva Davies
- Artwork and computer graphics – Patti Gaines for Genki.
- Photography – Tony Mott.

== Charts ==
Chart (1993)	Peak position
Australian Albums (ARIA)	44
