= Love in Motion (1996 Icehouse album) =

Compilation album by Icehouse
- Released: September 1996
- Genre: Rock, new wave
- Label: dIVA/Massive

Icehouse chronology
The Singles (1996)	Love in Motion (1996)	No Promises (1997)

Professional ratings
Review scores
Source	Rating
Allmusic	3/5 stars

Love in Motion is a compilation album released in September 1996 by Australian rock/synth-pop band Icehouse in The Netherlands on dIVA / Massive Records. It is not to be confused with the band's 1983 UK release of Love in Motion which was a re-release of 1982's Primitive Man.

== Track listing ==
1. "Mr. Big"
2. "Too Late Now"
3. "Don't Believe Anymore"
4. "Love in Motion"
5. "Not My Kind"
6. "Someone Like You"
7. "Sister"
8. "The Flame"
9. "Regular Boys"
10. "Stay Close Tonight"
11. "Sidewalk"
12. "Boulevarde"
