= Walls (Icehouse song) =

- 1981 Australian release (Regular Records)

Single by Flowers

from the album Icehouse
- B-side: "All the Way"
- Released: January 26, 1981
- Genre: Rock, synthpop, new wave
- Length: 4:22
- Label: Regular; Chrysalis
- Songwriter: Iva Davies
- Producer: Walls Cameron Allan Iva Davies - All The Way Iva Davies

Flowers singles chronology
"We Can Get Together" (1980)	"Walls" (1981)	"Icehouse" (1981)

"Walls" Alternative Cover
- Regular Records (1981 NZ release)

"Walls" is the third single released by the Australian rock band Flowers, later known as Icehouse. Written by Iva Davies it was released in January 1981, on independent label Regular Records from the Flowers debut album, Icehouse, it peaked at #20 on the Australian Kent Music Reoport Singles Charts. It was also released in New Zealand, with a different cover, which was the last Flowers release before the band was renamed as Icehouse.

Iva Davies has said that "Walls" was autobiographical for a period of his life.

The music video for "Walls" was directed by Trevor Hawkins and is the same Sydney apartment used as location for the 1980 released song "Cheap Wine" by Australian band Cold Chisel.

The Davies-produced b-side "All The Way" is included on various compact disc (CD) re-releases of the Icehouse album. The 1987 CD additionally noting "mastered for CD by David Hemming and Rick O'Neil" and the 2011 CD as Davies playing the oboe.

"Walls" was in September 1981 released internationally by Chrysalis Records in the United States by Icehouse as a single from the re-mixed self-titled Icehouse album.

The 1989 Icehouse compilation album Great Southern Land includes a remixed version of "Walls" by Steve Thompson & Michael Barbiero.

== Reception ==
In a single review Cash Box magazine said "Icehouse's Iva Davies entreats the listener to once again enter the Australian band's world of densely textured synth-rock... The title is appropriate enough, as the quartet bursts from a heartbeat rhythm in to wall-like keyboard and guitar hook."

== Track listings ==
All tracks written by Iva Davies.

Regular Records (Australia and New Zealand):

1. "Walls" - 4:22
2. "All the Way" - 3:50

Chrysalis Records (United States):

1. "Walls" - 3:49
2. "Fatman" - 3:50

== Charts ==
Chart (1981)	Peak position
Australian (Kent Music Report)	20
New Zealand (Recorded Music NZ)	43
