= Icehouse (song) =

- "Icehouse" 1982 UK release

Single by Icehouse

from the album Icehouse
- B-side: "All the Way" (live)
- Released: 1982
- Recorded: 1980
- Genre: Synthpop; new wave
- Length: 4:23
- Label: Chrysalis
- Songwriter: Iva Davies
- Producers: Cameron Allan; Iva Davies

Icehouse singles chronology
"Walls" (1981)	"Icehouse" (1982)	"Love in Motion" (1981)

"Icehouse" is a song by the Australian rock band Icehouse (formerly Flowers) from the band's first album, Icehouse. Upon the international release of the re-mixed Icehouse album in mid-1981, the track "Icehouse" spent 11 weeks on the Billboard Mainstream Rock Airplay chart, reaching a peak at number 28. At this time an accompanying music video was recorded in England under director Russell Mulcahy, and it became an early MTV signature video. In early 1982 "Icehouse" was released internationally as a 7" and 12" single, without reaching any significant chart position. The track was not issued in Australia as a single and the music video features the international album remix version. The Mulcahy video was reportedly banned by the Australian music television show Countdown for being "too macabre".

"Icehouse" was written in 1980 by founding Icehouse member Iva Davies when he lived in Sydney at 18 Tryon Road, Lindfield in an old, cold flat of a two-storey mansion—across the street was a dishevelled house which had its lights on all night peopled by short-term residents. Davies only learned that it was a half-way house for psychiatric and drug rehab patients after he wrote the song. "Icehouse" subsequently replaced Flowers as the name of the band in mid-1981.

In 1983 a cover version of the song was performed live by the band Option 30 with Trent Reznor (later Nine Inch Nails) on lead vocals.

A remix version by Pee Wee Ferris & John Ferris was released on the Icehouse album Meltdown in 2002.

The song "Icehouse" forms part of the narrative of the 2023 auto-fiction/horror novel The Shards by American author Bret Easton Ellis, and is used in The Shards (TV series) episode four which first-aired in 2026.

== Track listing ==
All tracks written by Iva Davies except where noted.

=== 7" single (UK release) ===
1. "Icehouse" - 4:23
2. "All the Way" (live) - 4:06

=== 12" single (UK release) ===
1. "Icehouse" - 4:23
2. "All the Way" (live) - 4:06
3. "Cold Turkey" (live)(written by John Lennon) - 4:11

== Personnel ==
- Producer — Cameron Allan, Iva Davies
