= The Berlin Tapes =

Soundtrack album by Iva Davies & Icehouse
- Released: October 1995
- Studio: dIVA Studios, Whale Beach, Australia
- Genre: Rock
- Length: 46:09 Original single CD release
- Label: dIVA/Massive/For Life
- Producer: Iva Davies

Iva Davies & Icehouse chronology
| Full Circle (1994) | The Berlin Tapes (1995) | The Singles (1996) |

Singles from The Berlin Tapes
- 1. "Heaven" Released: September 1995; 2. "Complicated Game" Released: February 1996

Professional ratings
Review scores
| Source | Rating |
|---|---|
| AllMusic (2002) | 2.5/5 stars |

The Berlin Tapes is a soundtrack album, credited to Australian rock musician Iva Davies and Icehouse. The record was a collaboration between Davies and classical music composer Max Lambert to accompany the Sydney Dance Company's production of the ballet Berlin, for which Icehouse performed live on stage.

The covers are mostly acoustic, with piano, strings and subtle electronica incorporated into most tracks. The record was initially released as a single or double disc set, with the second disc consisting of instrumental Icehouse tracks performed with the ballet.

A 1996 Japanese re-release included three bonus tracks; a 2002 digitally remastered version with five bonus tracks was released in Australia – this time credited simply to Icehouse.

At the ARIA Music Awards of 1996, the album was nominated for Best Original Soundtrack, Cast or Show Album.

== Track listing ==
=== Australian 1995 release ===
1. "Loving the Alien" (David Bowie) – 5:34
2. "Sister Europe" (The Psychedelic Furs) – 3:59
3. "Heaven" (Talking Heads) – 4:27
4. "Complicated Game" (XTC) – 5:27
5. "Berlin" (Lou Reed) – 0:49
6. "All the Way" (Frank Sinatra) – 3:16
7. "All Tomorrow's Parties" (The Velvet Underground) – 4:35
8. "Let There Be Love" (Simple Minds) – 4:33
9. "Disappointed" (Public Image Ltd) – 5:26
10. "A Really Good Time" (Roxy Music) – 3:23
11. "At Night" (The Cure) – 3:57
12. "Love Like Blood" (Killing Joke) – 5:47
13. "Heroes" (David Bowie) – 4:29

==== Australian 2CD (bonus disc) ====
1. "Dedicated to Glam"
2. "Melt Steel Part 1"
3. "Orbital Line"
4. "Melt Steel Part 2"
5. "Pas de Trois" – 4:46
6. "Giant and Child Fugue" – 2:15
7. "Melt Steel Part 3"
8. "Crazy (Midnight Mix)"

=== Japanese 1996 release ===
Track listing for 1–13 is identical to single CD issue.

Japanese 1996 release bonus tracks
| No. | Title | Length |
|---|---|---|
| 14. | "Be My Friend" (Free) | 4:04 |
| 15. | "Being Boiled" (The Human League) | 4:24 |
| 16. | "Blank Frank" (Brian Eno) | 3:37 |
| 17. | "How Do You Sleep?" (John Lennon) | 8:02 |

=== Australian 2002 reissue ===
Track listing for 1–13 is identical to original single CD issue.

Australian 2002 reissue bonus tracks
| No. | Title | Length |
|---|---|---|
| 14. | "Be My Friend" (Free) | 4:04 |
| 15. | "Being Boiled" (The Human League) | 4:24 |
| 16. | "How Do You Sleep?" (John Lennon) | 8:02 |
| 17. | "Giant and Child Fugue" (Icehouse original) | 2:15 |
| 18. | "Pas de Trois" (Icehouse original) | 4:46 |

Notes

- Tracks 14–16 originally appeared on the Japanese issue of The Berlin Tapes.
- Tracks 17–18 originally appeared on the second 2-CD issue of The Berlin Tapes.

=== Australian 2012 reissue ===
This version adds the additional tracks from the 2002 reissue (minus Being Boiled), plus the Athens Mix of Heroes from the 2004 release of the same name.

Track listing for 1–13 is identical to original single CD issue.

Australian 2012 reissue bonus tracks
| No. | Title | Length |
|---|---|---|
| 14. | "Be My Friend" (Free) | 4:04 |
| 15. | "How Do You Sleep?" (John Lennon) | 8:02 |
| 16. | "Giant and Child Fugue" (Icehouse original) | 2:15 |
| 17. | "Pas de Trois" (Icehouse original) | 4:46 |
| 18. | "Heroes (The Athens Mix)" (David Bowie) | 3:54 |

== Personnel ==
Adapted from AllMusic.

- Greg Barrett – photography
- Cover photo of Katherine Griffiths, Sydney Dance Company
- Don Bartley – mastering
- Steve Bull – bass guitar
- David Chapman – arranger, programming, engineer
- Iva Davies – guitar (acoustic), bass, keyboards, programming, vocals, engineer, digital remastering (2002),
- Bruce Elder – liner notes
- Simon Leadley – engineer
- Ryan Scott – digital remastering (2002 version)
- Adrian Wallis – cello
- Paul Wheeler – drums

== Charts ==
| Chart (1995) | Peak position |
|---|---|
| New Zealand Albums (RMNZ) | 47 |
