= Can't Help Myself (Flowers song) =

- "Can't Help Myself" by Flowers

Single by Flowers

from the album Icehouse
- B-side: "Send Somebody"
- Released: 13 May 1980
- Recorded: 1980
- Genre: Synth-pop; new wave
- Length: 3:10
- Label: Regular; Chrysalis
- Songwriter: Iva Davies
- Producers: Cameron Allan; Iva Davies

Flowers singles chronology
"Can't Help Myself" (1980)	"We Can Get Together" (1980)

Music video
- "Can't Help Myself" on YouTube

"Can't Help Myself" by Flowers Alternative cover

"Can't Help Myself" by Icehouse Alternative cover

"Can't Help Myself" is the first single released by the Australian synth-pop/rock band Flowers, later known as Icehouse. The song was written by the band's lead guitarist and vocalist Iva Davies.

The song was released in May 1980 as a 7" vinyl single on independent label, Regular Records, five months ahead of debut album Icehouse. A 10" vinyl single was released in July and had a picture sleeve cover depicting individual images of band members diagonally across the band's name and the single's title (see infobox at right middle). The song peaked at #10 on the Australian Singles Charts.

At this time a 7" single was also released by Flowers in New Zealand under the Interfusion label (no picture sleeve), peaking at #29..

The music video was filmed in 1980 in a car park in Chatswood, Sydney.

The version of "Can't Help Myself" on the Flowers debut album Icehouse was a different and longer re-mix. Reissues of the album on compact disc (CD) (1987 onwards) and vinyl (2017) have the original 7" version.A 2011 CD reissue of the album Icehouse includes a bonus track "Can't Help Myself (Original 10" Single Mix)", which at 3:40 duration is different in length to the two 3:10 and 5:51 versions on the 1980 released 10" vinyl.

After Flowers in mid-1981 changed their name to Icehouse, Iva Davies and Ed Thacker remixed the debut Icehouse album for Chrysalis Records. In addition to being on the album, this further mix of "Can't Help Myself" was released in various international markets as both 7" and extended 12" vinyl singles (see infobox at right below).

A remix version by Australian Trance DJ, beXta, was released on the Icehouse album Meltdown in 2002.

The two 2013 Icehouse CD albums The Extended Mixes Vol.1 and The Extended Mixes Vol.2 each contain one of the Chrysalis Records extended versions from 1981. The longer version from the 1980 Flowers 10" single was released on CD in 2017 on a compilation album of various artists titled 12 Inch Dance: Australian 80s Pop.

In January 2018, as part of Triple M's "Ozzest 100", the 'most Australian' songs of all time, "Can't Help Myself" was ranked number 85.

According to Davies, "Can't Help Myself" was in part inspired by the guitar work sounds towards the end and fade out of the Michael Jackson hit song "Don't Stop 'Til You Get Enough".

== Reception ==
In a single review Cash Box magazine called it "a quick stepping rhythm embellished by both guitar and synthesiser, draws the listener in."

== Track listing ==
All tracks written by Iva Davies (as Ivor Arthur Davies) unless otherwise indicated.

=== 7" single (Australian & New Zealand release) ===
1. "Can't Help Myself" - 3:10
2. "Send Somebody" (Iva Davies, Michael Hoste) - 3:42

=== 10" single (Australian release) ===
1. "Can't Help Myself" - 3:10
2. "Send Somebody" (Davies, Hoste) - 3:40
3. "Can't Help Myself" (Extended version) - 5:51

=== 7" single (UK, Netherlands & Spain releases) ===
Sources:

1. "Can't Help Myself" (album version) - 3:47
2. "Fatman" (album version) - 3:50

=== 7" single (UK & Canada releases) ===
Sources:

1. "Can't Help Myself" (Club Mix 1) - 3:27
2. "Fatman" (album version) - 3:50

=== 12" single (UK & Spain releases) ===
Sources:

1. "Can't Help Myself" (U.S. Club Mix 1) - 6:05
2. "Can't Help Myself" (U.S. Club Mix 2) - 5:41
3. "Fatman" (album version) - 3:50

== Personnel ==
Credits:

Flowers members

- Iva Davies – vocals, guitar
- Anthony Smith – keyboards, backing vocals
- John Lloyd – drums, backing vocals
- Keith Welsh – bass guitar, backing vocals

Recording details

- Engineer: David Cafe
- Producer: Cameron Allan, Iva Davies
- Studio: "Can't Help Myself" and "Send Somebody" recorded at Paradise Studios, Sydney
- Chrysalis Records (album) Re-Mix: Iva Davies with Ed Thacker
- Chrysalis Records (7" & 12") Club Re-Mix: Daniel Coulombe & Ed Thacker

== Charts ==
=== Weekly charts ===
Chart (1980)	Peak position
Australia (Kent Music Report)	10
New Zealand (Recorded Music NZ)	29

=== Year-end charts ===
Chart (1980)	Position
Australia (Kent Music Report)	44
