= Bexta =

Australian DJ

BeXta
- Born: Rebecca Elizabeth Poulsen
- Origin: Brisbane, Queensland, Australia
- Genre: Trance
- Occupations: DJ, producer
- Instruments: Keyboards, sampler
- Years active: 1992–present
- Label: Mixology Digital
- Website: bexta.com

BeXta is the performance name of Rebecca Elizabeth Poulsen, a trance and hard dance, DJ and producer. She studied classical music and music technology before turning to electronic dance music from 1992. BeXta established her own label, Mixology Digital, in 2000.

== Biography ==
Rebecca Elizabeth Poulsen studied at Queensland Conservatorium of Music for a Bachelor of Sonology. She started creating her own music using keyboards and computers in 1992 and started performing live as BeXta in 1993. BeXta extended her talents to DJing in 1997 and her first weekly residency was Plastic in Sydney in 1998.

In 1995 she released her first single, "Lunar Tango", on an independent label in Melbourne. She supported shows by Björk and by Prodigy. Her debut album, beXtaIsm, was issued on a music cassette in that same year. Bexta has several single releases currently, after the release of the EP - Skirmish LIVE, this was received well entering the ARIA singles charts in 1999. One album, Conversations with ones and zeroes has reached number 8 on the ARIA independent album charts in 2004.

Bexta produces the DJ compilation series, Mixology, beginning in 2000, As of 2010 there were 12 releases in this series.

BeXta has toured extensively in Australia since the late 1990s and internationally as well, including the UK, Canada, China, Indonesia, and New Zealand. She was voted Australia's number one female dj by the general public for several years in the mid-2000s, and one year was ranked number 3 DJ in Australia. She has also remixed many international dance artists, and Australian artists such as Icehouse, Vanessa Amarossi, Bonni Anderson, and the ACDC track "Thunderstruck".

Bexta is featured in "BNE - The Definitive Archive: Brisbane Independent Electronic Music Production 1979-2014", which is a hardcover book and USB music archive published by Trans:Com in September 2014.

BeXta is featured in the INTHEMIX Top 100 Australian Dance Tracks of all Time

BeXta completed a PhD in auditory processing and neuroscience at the Queensland Brain Institute in 2022 and is currently a research fellow investigating sensory processing in neurodivergent populations.

== Discography ==
=== Original Music releases ===
1995 - "Lunar Tango" (cd single)
1995 - beXtaIsm (cassette)
1996 - Raindance (on Strictly Trance Compilation)
1997 - Energise on (Strictly Techno 4 Compilation)
1998 - Questron (cd single)
1998 - Close Encounters (written with Jen-E for DJ Beats Compilation)
1999 - Skirmish Live EP (cd and vinyl release)*
2000 - Drum Beets Go (vinyl release)
2001 - One for the Road (international vinyl release)
2001 - Rising Sun - original and PeeWee Ferris Remix
2002 - Music Makers (cd and vinyl release)
2003 - Universe (vinyl release)
2003 - Skirmish Live EP (cd re-release)
2004 - Conversations with ones and zeroes
2004 - Alien - single and video clip from Conversations with ones and zeroes album
2006 - Vinyl EP - Mixology9 - BeXta vs Public Domain, Vandertraxx and Dave Joy
2007 - Falling single
2008 - VIP single release with remixes - featuring Amii Jackson
2008 - Digital rerelease of Lunar Tango
2008 - BeXta vs Van de TRaxx - Silent Dance
2008 - BeXta vs Dave Joy - Club One
2008 - BeXta v Meza - In my mind
2009 - BeXta v Jason Midro - Bass Station
2010 - SHFL feat Phats Life
2010 - Angel (Ultimate Tribute Mix) on Central Energy Compilation
2011 - The Essential BeXta Collection - Album
2011 - Make It Phunkee 2011 Remix
2011 - One for the Road - 2011 Remix
2011 - Energize - 2011 Remix

=== ReMiXes ===
1996 - Southend - The Winner Is (Northend Mix)
1997 - Vision Four 5 - Purple Lamp
2000 - Southend - The Winner Is (version 2)
2002 - Sonic Animation - It's Time
2002 - Wavestorm - Rock the Party (UK release)
2002 - ACDC - Thunderstruck
2003 - Icehouse - Can't Help Myself
2004 - JvE - Star Rider 2005 - Tydi - Familiar Streets 2008 - Vanessa Amorosi - Perfect
2008 - Patric Carera - Mono Life
2008 - Digital release of the 1999 release - Skirmish Live EP
2009 - Joe-E v Klones - Virus Attack remix
2009 - Freaky G - Bend Ya Neck Remix
2010 - Lisa Lashes and Anne Savage - "Release Me" remix
2010 - Soul-T and Dj Em - PHD anthem remix
2011 - Amber D - Ambers Theme remix
2012 - Bonnie Anderson "Blackout"

=== DJ compilations ===
2000 - Mixology
2001 - Mixology 2
2001 - Mixology 3
2002 - Mixology 4
2003 - Mixology 5
2004 - Mixology 6
2005 - Mixology 7
2005 - Mixology 8
2006 - Mixology 9
2007 - Mixology 10
2008 - Mixology 11 with Sophie Sugar
2010 - Central Energy 2010 Disc 2
2011 - Mixology 12
2012 - Hard Electrik - DJ cd compilation - compilation mix with Scott Attrill, Andrea Montorsi, & more
