= Great Southern Land =

1982 single by Icehouse

- Great Southern Land (12" vinyl) - Regular Records

Single by Icehouse

from the album Primitive Man
- B-side: "Uniform"
- Released: 9 August 1982
- Genre: New wave; synth-pop
- Length: 5:07 (7"); 5:14 (LP)
- Label: Regular; Chrysalis
- Songwriter: Iva Davies
- Producers: Iva Davies; Keith Forsey

Icehouse singles chronology
"Love in Motion" (1981)	"Great Southern Land" (1982)	"Hey Little Girl" (1982)

"Great Southern Land" is a song by the Australian rock band Icehouse. Written by the band's vocalist and lead guitarist Iva Davies, it was released on 9 August 1982 as the lead single from their second studio album Primitive Man. It peaked at No. 5 on the Australian Singles Chart, and was later featured in the 1988 film Young Einstein. "Great Southern Land" was Icehouse's most popular song according to listeners of Triple M in 2007.

At the 1982 Countdown Music Awards, the song was nominated for Best Australian Single. Unusually for a commercial radio hit, the song's length on the 7" single release exceeded five minutes. Iva Davies composed the song's lyrics using the cut-up technique championed by William Burroughs, intentionally creating a contrast to Men at Work’s hit "Down Under" which Davies said relied on clichés about Australia.

In 1989 an edited version of "Great Southern Land" remixed by Steve Thompson and Michael Barbiero was released internationally under Chrysalis Records as a cassette single (3:43) in conjunction with the film Young Einstein and the Icehouse greatest hits compilation album, Great Southern Land. The full length remixed version (5:20) of the song appears on the Australian release of the same album, on some international editions of the album, and on the music video compilation (as "Great Southern Land '89").

There are two versions of the music video. The Australian original version, was filmed at the disused Jones' quarry in Wahroonga in 1982, with solarised clips of the band in daylight and surrounded by camp fires at night. Appearing the video alongside Davies are the song's co-producer Keith Forsey, and Icehouse 1982 touring band members John Lloyd and Michael Hoste. The USA version ("Great Southern Land '89") was made in 1989 for the movie Young Einstein and it has Iva Davies walking around Myall Lakes National Park on the east coast of Australia.

In 1999, Iva Davies was commissioned by Spectak Productions on behalf of the City of Sydney Council to create a musical score to ring in the new Millennium in the forecourt of the Sydney Opera House. Iva took his song “Great Southern Land” and created a new version released as CD under the title “The Ghost of Time”. The performance in the forecourt of the Sydney Opera House, featuring Iva Davies, Guy Pratt, Richard Tognetti, Glenn Krawczyk, Sydney Symphony Orchestra, and TaikOz, was seen by millions of people around the world. Having watched that show on television, Australian film director Peter Weir subsequently contacted Davies and engaged him to compose the soundtrack for the movie Master and Commander: The Far Side of the World "based on that style".

On 5 September 2011, "Great Southern Land" re-entered the Australian (ARIA) Singles Chart at No. 66. In November 2014 the song was selected for inclusion on the Australian National Film & Sound Archive's "Sounds of Australia" list.

The song is also used as the walk out tune for the Australian cricket team for their home matches during the Australian summer.

Qantas added eight 787-9 Dreamliners to its fleet in 2017. The airlines named each Dreamliner from suggestions and votes from the public. The name “Great Southern Land” was chosen for the first aircraft out of 45,000 suggestions from the public.

In January 2018, as part of Triple M's "Ozzest 100", the 'most Australian' songs of all time, "Great Southern Land" was ranked number 4. In 2025 it placed 35 in the Triple J Hottest 100 of Australian Songs.In 2022 Icehouse's Iva Davies with William Barton (didgeridoo) performed the song at the National Museum of Australia in conjunction with the opening of its "Great Southern Land gallery".

The August 1982 12" single release of "Great Southern Land" in Australia contains the same version as the 7" single, with an extended mix of the Primitive Man album track "Uniform" on the b-side. The b-side of the "Great Southern Land" 7" single is "Uniform" with lyrics sung by Iva Davies in German language instead of English, and an extended version of this appears on various compact disc album releases including Primitive Man and The Extended Mixes, Vol. 1 (2013).

== Remixes ==
In 1993, producer Bill Laswell set up a 16-minute remix with Aboriginal Australians, Parliament-Funkadelic alumnus Bernie Worrell and the avant-garde guitarist Buckethead for inclusion on the 1994 remix compilation Full Circle. An edited version named "Byrralku Dhangudha", with unnamed Aborigines partly singing the chorus in language was included on the EP Spin One in 1993. The same edit was released as a single in Germany in 1994 as "Great Southern Land (1994 version)". Another remix version by Endorphin was released on the Icehouse album Meltdown in 2002.

In 2012, Tourism Australia collaborated with Iva Davies to create an online video clip to celebrate the 30th anniversary of the song. The clip includes famous musicians such as Katie Noonan, Cut Copy, Van She and Eskimo Joe, along with everyday Australian characters including an oyster farmer from Barilla Bay in Tasmania and a local choir from the Blue Mountains.

A cover version partly sung in the Gamilaraay language was recorded by Mitch Tambo and Reigan Derry in 2023, with the approval of Davies.

== Track listing ==
All tracks written by Iva Davies.

=== 7" single (Australian release) ===
1. "Great Southern Land" – 5:07
2. "Uniform" (German lyrics vocals) – 4:03

=== 12" single (Australian release) ===
1. "Great Southern Land" – 5:07
2. "Uniform" (extended mix) – 6:02

=== 7" single (US release) ===
1. "Great Southern Land" (edit)
2. "Great Southern Land" (album version)

=== 1994 single (German release) ===
1. "Great Southern Land" (1994 version) – 3:47
2. "Dedicated to Glam" (12" mix) – 4:25
3. "Great Southern Land" (original version) – 5:16

== Charts ==
=== Weekly charts ===
Chart (1982–1983)	Peak position
Australia (Kent Music Report)	5
New Zealand (Recorded Music NZ)	10
UK Singles (Official Charts)	83

Chart (2011)	Peak position
Australia (ARIA)	66

2023 weekly chart performance for "Great Southern Land" by Cassian & Icehouse
Chart (2023)	Peak position
Ukraine Airplay (TopHit)	44

=== Year-end charts ===
Chart (1982)	Rank
Australia (Kent Music Report)	59
New Zealand (Recorded Music NZ)	46

== Certifications ==
Certifications for "Great Southern Land"
Region	Certification	Certified units/sales
New Zealand (RMNZ)	2× Platinum	60,000^{‡}
^{‡} Sales+streaming figures based on certification alone.
