= Electric Blue (song) =

1987 song by Icehouse

- "Electric Blue" Australian release

Single by Icehouse

from the album Man of Colours
- B-side: "Over My Head"
- Released: 31 August 1987
- Studio: EMI 301 (Sydney)
- Genre: Synth-pop
- Length: 4:23 (album version); 7:34 (extended mix); 4:59 (dub mix); 6:44 (12" version)
- Label: Regular; Chrysalis
- Songwriters: Iva Davies; John Oates
- Producer: David Lord

Icehouse singles chronology
"Crazy" (1987)	"Electric Blue" (1987)	"My Obsession" (1987)

Music videos
- "Electric Blue" on YouTube

"Electric Blue" is a song by Australian rock band Icehouse. It was co-written by Iva Davies of Icehouse and John Oates of US band Hall & Oates. Oates became involved with Davies after contacting him to state he was a fan; the resulting collaboration produced this song. Oates has stated that if Davies had not released the song under the Icehouse name, it would have been a Hall & Oates track.

"Electric Blue" was released on 31 August 1987 as the second single from Icehouse's fifth studio album, Man of Colours (1987). It was issued through Regular Records in Australia and through Chrysalis Records in Europe and North America. In Australia, "Electric Blue" was available for a limited time on 7-inch blue vinyl. It is played regularly on Australian radio stations and remained one of their most popular songs two decades later, according to listeners of Triple M in 2007.

"Electric Blue" reached number one on the Australian Music Report, number seven on the US Billboard Hot 100, number 10 on the Canadian RPM 100 Singles chart, and number four on New Zealand's RIANZ Singles Chart. In the United Kingdom, where the song was released in April 1988, it stalled at number 53 on the UK Singles Chart the following month. In 2025, the song ranked 92 on the Triple J Hottest 100 of Australian Songs.

== Background ==
John Oates created the falsetto backing vocals as one of the first parts of the song, which took Iva Davies by surprise, because he was used to adding backing vocals as a finishing touch. Davies said the title was inspired by the 1970 T. Rex song "Jewel", which contains the verse, "Her eyes electric blue". Davies said, "I was taken by the description of a girl's eyes as 'electric blue'."

== Music video ==
The music video for "Electric Blue" was shot on the roof of the New South Wales Teachers Federation building at 23–33 Mary Street, Surry Hills, Sydney, Australia. The actress featured in the video is Paris Jefferson, who also appeared in the music video for Icehouse's previous single, "Crazy".

== Remixes and covers ==
A remix version by Skipraiders was released on the Icehouse album Meltdown in 2002. Electropop group Ming and Ping recorded a cover as a track on their 2014 album "The Light of Day/The Darkness of Night". American indie rock band the Killers performed the song in a livestream in August 2020, which Davies later called "the most impressive" cover he'd seen.

== Track listings ==
7-inch and US cassette single

A. "Electric Blue"
B. "Over My Head"

Australian 12-inch and cassette single

1. "Electric Blue" (12-inch)
2. "Electric Blue" (7-inch)
3. "Electric Blue" (dub version mix)
4. "Over My Head"

UK 12-inch single

A1. "Electric Blue" (extended mix) – 7:32
B1. "Electric Blue" (dub mix) – 5:03
B2. "Over My Head" – 3:48

UK CD single

1. "Electric Blue" (extended mix)
2. "Crazy" (Manic mix)
3. "Over My Head"

== Charts ==
=== Weekly charts ===
Chart (1987–1988)	Peak position
Australia (Kent Music Report)	1
Canada Top Singles (RPM)	10
Netherlands (Single Top 100)	83
New Zealand (Recorded Music NZ)	4
UK Singles (Official Charts)	53
US Billboard Hot 100	7
US Adult Contemporary (Billboard)	36
US Mainstream Rock (Billboard)	10

=== Year-end charts ===
Chart (1987)	Position
Australia (Australian Music Report)	8

Chart (1988)	Position
Canada Top Singles (RPM)	89
US Billboard Hot 100	77

== Release history ==
Region	Date	Format(s)	Label(s)	Ref.
Australia	31 August 1987	7-inch vinyl; 12-inch vinyl; cassette	Regular	
United Kingdom	18 April 1988	7-inch vinyl; 12-inch vinyl; CD	Chrysalis	
