= No Promises (Icehouse song) =

Single by Icehouse

from the album Measure for Measure
- B-side: "The Perfect Crime"
- Released: 28 October 1985
- Recorded: 1985
- Genre: New wave
- Length: 4:40 (Album Version); 4:40 (instrumental); 3:45 (12" Version); 4:10 (7" Version); 8:50 (US Club Mix); 6:11 (Extended Mix); 5:12 (Dub Mix)
- Label: Regular; Chrysalis
- Songwriters: Iva Davies; Robert Kretschmer
- Producers: Iva Davies; Rhett Davies

Icehouse singles chronology
"Dusty Pages" (1984)	"No Promises" (1985)	"Baby You're So Strange" (1986)

"No Promises" is a song by the Australian band Icehouse, released on 28 October 1985, as the first single issued from the band's 1986 album, Measure for Measure. The single was released in Australia through Regular Records, on 7", 12" and maxi-cassette single formats. Chrysalis Records issued the single in the UK and Europe on 7" and 12" formats, with different track listings. "No Promises" was subsequently released in the US by Chrysalis on 7" and 12" formats, again with different track listings. The single peaked at #30 on the Australian singles chart in February 1986.

The song was originally composed and recorded as part of the Boxes dance collaboration between Icehouse and the Graeme Murphy's Sydney Dance Company performed in late 1985 at the Sydney Opera House.

A remixed version by (Love) Tattoo was included on the Icehouse remix album Meltdown in 2002. Two music videos were filmed to promote the single; the second of these was directed by Dieter Trattmann.

"No Promises" appears in the 1986 film Modern Girls and included on the related Modern Girls: Original Motion Picture Soundtrack album.

== Track listings ==
7" single (Australian/NZ release)

1. "No Promises" – 4:10
2. "The Perfect Crime" – 3:34

7" single (UK/Europe release)

1. "No Promises" – 4:10
2. "The Perfect Crime" – 3:34

12" single (Australian/NZ release)

1. "No Promises" (extended mix)
2. "The Tempest"
3. "Gravity"
4. "Terra Incognito"

12" single (UK/Europe release)

1. "No Promises" (extended mix) – 7:00
2. "No Promises" – 3:40
3. "The Perfect Crime" – 5:58

7" single (US release)

1. "No Promises" – 3:59
2. "Into The Wild" – 4:52

12" single (US release)

1. "No Promises" (club mix) – 8:45
2. "No Promises" (dub) – 5:10
3. "No Promises" (instrumental) – 4:40

== Charts ==
Chart (1985–1986)	Peak position
Australia (Kent Music Report)	30
Belgium (Ultratop 50 Flanders)	34
Canada (RPM Top Singles)	61
New Zealand (Recorded Music NZ)	29
UK Singles (Official Charts)	72
US Billboard Hot 100	79
US Billboard Top Rock Tracks	9
US Billboard Dance Club Songs	7
US Billboard Hot Dance Singles Sales	32

== Trivia ==
Neil Peart of Rush has claimed in his memoirs "Roadshow – Landscape With Drums: a Concert Tour by Motorcycle" that "No Promises" was his favorite song during August of 1986:

One week in August of '86, I went down to Newport with a group of friends from Toronto (the parking tag from Newport Yacht Club still hangs in my garage, and my favorite song at the time was "No Promises," by an Australian band called Icehouse-I remember playing it again and again as I drove my Porsche 911 convertible through the White Mountains of New Hampshire).

— Neil Peart, January 2006
