= Hey Little Girl =

- 1982 Chrysalis Records (7" vinyl release)

Single by Icehouse

from the album Primitive Man
- B-side: "Glam"
- Released: 1 November 1982
- Genre: Synth-pop; new wave
- Length: 3:53
- Label: Regular; Chrysalis
- Songwriter: Iva Davies
- Producers: Iva Davies; Keith Forsey

Icehouse singles chronology
"Great Southern Land" (1982)	"Hey Little Girl" (1982)	"Street Cafe" (1982)

Alternative cover
- 1983 Chrysalis Records (US 7" vinyl release)

"Hey Little Girl" is a single released by Australian band Icehouse, the second single from the band's second studio album, Primitive Man (1982). The album and single were co-produced by band member and the track's writer, Iva Davies, and Keith Forsey. It was released in November 1982 on Regular Records in 7" vinyl single and 12" vinyl single formats. UK and Europe releases by Chrysalis Records were also on 7" and 12" formats, but with different track listings. The single was then released in the US in 1983 on the same formats. On "Hey Little Girl", Iva Davies uses the Linn drum machine—the first for an Australian recording. It peaked at No. 7 on the Australian singles chart and No. 2 in Switzerland, No. 5 in Germany, Top 20 in UK, Sweden and Netherlands, and No. 31 on the Billboard Mainstream Rock chart. It didn't make the Top 50 in Canada.

The US cover for the single has a still from the Russell Mulcahy music video for "Hey Little Girl".

In 1997, a series of re-mixes of the song was released in Germany on the Edel Music label. Another remix version by Infusion was released on the Icehouse album Meltdown in 2002.

== Charts ==
=== Weekly charts ===
Chart (1982–1983)	Peak position
Australia (Kent Music Report)	7
Austria (Ö3 Austria Top 40)	9
Belgium (Ultratop 50 Flanders)	13
France (IFOP)	13
Ireland (IRMA)	15
Netherlands (Dutch Top 40)	13
Netherlands (Single Top 100)	12
New Zealand (Recorded Music NZ)	9
Sweden (Sverigetopplistan)	12
Switzerland (Schweizer Hitparade)	2
UK Singles (Official Charts)	17
US Billboard Hot Dance Club Play	55
US Billboard Top Tracks	31
West Germany (GfK)	5

=== Year-end charts ===
Chart (1983)	Position
West Germany (Official German Charts)	37

== Track listing ==
All tracks written by Iva Davies.

=== 7" single (Australian/NZ release) ===
1. "Hey Little Girl" – 3:53
2. "Glam" (dance remix) – 6:40

=== 7" single (UK/Europe release) ===
1. "Hey Little Girl" – 4:10
2. "Love in Motion" – 3:34

=== 12" single (Australian/NZ release) ===
1. "Hey Little Girl" (extended dance remix) — 6:59
2. "Glam" — 3:18
3. "Glam" (extended dance remix) — 6:38

=== 12" single (UK/Europe release) ===
1. "Hey Little Girl" (disco edit mix) – 7:00
2. "Hey Little Girl" – 3:40
3. "Can't Help Myself" (club disco mix) – 5:58

=== 7" single (US release) ===
1. "Hey Little Girl" – 3:40
2. "Mysterious Thing" – 4:21

=== 12" single (US release) ===
1. "Hey Little Girl" (extended version) – 6:11
2. "Hey Little Girl (dub version) – 6:14

Cover of "Hey Little Girl '97 Remixes"

=== CD single (German release) ===
1. "Hey Little Girl" (radio edit) – 3:45
2. "Hey Little Girl" (future house single) – 3:40
3. "Hey Little Girl" (x/tended edit) – 4:59
4. "Hey Little Girl" (DJ Darling vs DJ Sören) – 6:40
5. "Hey Little Girl" (original version) – 4:22

=== 12" version (German release) ===
1. "Hey Little Girl" (DJ Darling vs DJ Sören) – 6:40
2. "Hey Little Girl" (future house single) – 3:40
3. "Hey Little Girl" (X/tended edit) – 4:59
4. "Hey Little Girl" (radio edit) – 3:45

== Personnel ==
Credits:

Icehouse members

- Iva Davies – vocals, guitar, Sequential Circuits Prophet-5, bass guitar, Linn drum machine

Additional musicians

- Keith Forsey – additional percussion
- Guy Pratt – bass guitar and backing vocals

Recording details

- Produced – Iva Davies, Keith Forsey

== Accolade ==
"Hey Little Girl" is included in Robert Dimery's 1001 Songs You Must Hear Before You Die.
