= Icehouse (band) =

Australian rock band

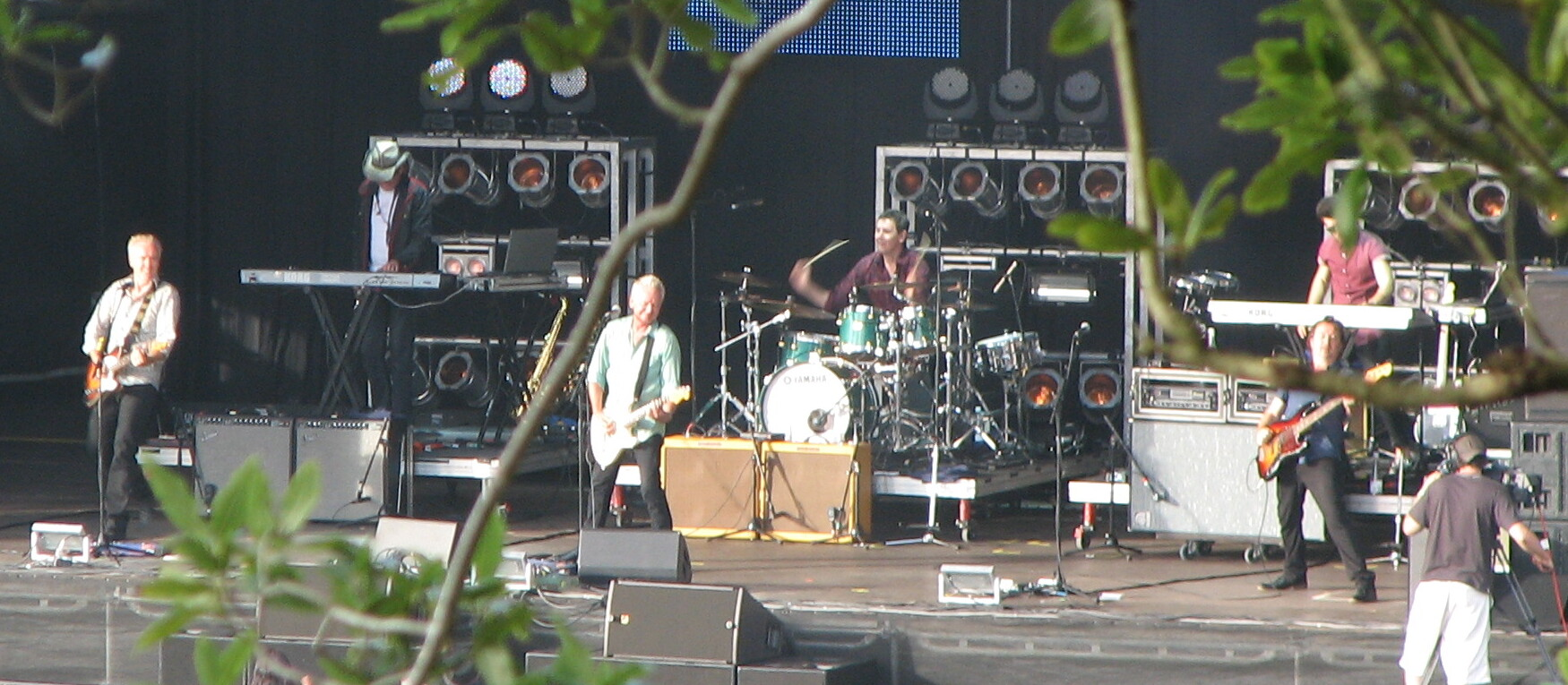
- Icehouse performing live in Auckland, New Zealand, 2012

Background information
- Also known as: Flowers; Iva Davies & Icehouse
- Origin: Sydney, New South Wales, Australia
- Genres: Rock; new wave; synth-pop
- Years active: 1977–present
- Labels: Regular; Festival; Diva; Warner; Chrysalis; Massive; EMI; WEA; Universal Australia
- Members: Iva Davies; Paul Wheeler; Paul Gildea; Steve Bull; Michael Paynter; Hugo Lee; Michael Best
- Past members: Keith Welsh; Ashley Sharpe; Don Brown; Michael Hoste; Anthony Smith; John Lloyd; Bob Kretschmer; Guy Pratt; Andy Qunta; Glenn Krawczyk; Simon Lloyd; Roger Mason; Tony Llewellyn; David Chapman; Max Lambert; Adrian Wallis; Steve Morgan; Gary Hughes; Glenn Reither
- Website: icehouse-ivadavies.com

Icehouse are an Australian rock band, formed in Sydney in 1977 as Flowers. Initially known in their homeland for their pub rock style, they later achieved mainstream success playing new wave and synth-pop music and attained Top 10 singles chart success locally and in both Europe and the U.S. The mainstay of both Flowers and Icehouse has been Iva Davies (singer-songwriter, record producer, guitar, bass, keyboards, oboe) supplying additional musicians as required. The name "Icehouse", adopted in 1981, comes from an old, cold flat Davies lived in and the strange building across the road populated by itinerant people.

Davies and Icehouse extended the use of synthesisers, particularly the Sequential Circuits Prophet-5 ("Love in Motion", 1981), Linn drum machine ("Hey Little Girl", 1982) and Fairlight CMI (Razorback trailer, 1983) in Australian popular music. Their best-known singles on the Australian charts include "Great Southern Land", "Hey Little Girl", "Crazy", "Electric Blue" and "My Obsession", their Top Three albums being Icehouse (1980, as Flowers), Primitive Man (1982) and Man of Colours (1987).

Icehouse were inducted into the Australian Recording Industry Association (ARIA) Hall of Fame on 16 August 2006. ARIA described Icehouse as "one of the most successful Australian bands of the eighties and nineties... With an uncompromising approach to music production they created songs that ranged from pure pop escapism to edgy, lavish synthesised pieces..." Icehouse has produced eight top-ten albums and twenty top-forty singles in Australia, multiple top-ten hits in Europe and North America and album sales of over 28 times platinum in Australasia alone.

== 1977–1980: Flowers ==
Flowers were formed in Sydney in 1977 by Iva Davies (vocals, guitar, bass guitar, keyboards, oboe), a classically trained musician, and their main creative force; with bass player Keith Welsh. Davies was working as a part-time cleaner at a Lindfield squash court managed by Welsh's mother, they lived nearby and were both interested in forming a band. Additional musicians used by Flowers in 1978 were Michael Hoste on keyboards and Don Brown on drums. The band built up a strong following as a live act around the pub circuit, providing distinctive cover versions of songs by David Bowie, Lou Reed, T-Rex, Ultravox and Brian Eno. The band performed at Cloudland on 28 July 1979, with The Numbers and British group XTC. By the middle of 1979 John Lloyd (ex-Paul Kelly and the Dots) replaced Don Brown on drums, with Anthony Smith (who was sometimes called Adam Hall) on keyboards, replacing Michael Hoste, who remained associated with the band and later rejoined.

After signing to the independent Regular Records label, distributed by Festival, Flowers released their debut single in May 1980, "Can't Help Myself" (written by Davies), which reached the Australian Top 10 in June 1980. This was followed by their debut album Icehouse, which reached No. 4 on the National albums chart and became one of the year's biggest-selling albums in Australia. The album, co-produced by Cameron Allan (Mental As Anything's producer) and Davies, made use of synthesisers, including the Minimoog, Solina Strings and Oberheim OB-1. Hoste co-wrote four tracks with Davies and played additional keyboards, with Smith continuing to provide the main keyboards. Further singles "We Can Get Together" and "Walls" from Icehouse also hit the Top 20.

Flowers' popularity was recognised when they were awarded the 1980 TV Week / Countdown Rock Awards 'Johnny O'Keefe New Talent Award' ahead of The Dugites, INXS and Karen Knowles. They were also nominated for 'Best Album' and 'Best Album Cover' for Icehouse but lost on both to Cold Chisel's East, Iva Davies was nominated as 'Best Songwriter' but lost to Cold Chisel's Don Walker. At the award ceremony, Flowers performed "Icehouse" with Davies framed within a cube of white neon tubing. In early 1981, Flowers signed to Chrysalis Records for European, Japanese, UK and U.S. releases; they had to change their name due to legal restrictions and to prevent confusion with a Scottish group The Flowers. Their last performance under the name Flowers was on 27 June 1981 at the Capitol Theatre in Sydney, they chose the name of their album to become known as Icehouse.

== 1981–1989: Icehouse ==
As Icehouse, the band spent the second half of 1981 touring the UK, Canada and the U.S., whilst Chrysalis released most of their Flowers material under the name Icehouse. The single "Icehouse" was released in Europe and created some interest in the UK, partly because of a video directed by Russell Mulcahy, while in the U.S. the song peaked at No. 28 on the Billboard Top Tracks chart in 1981. "Icehouse" had been written by Davies when he lived at 18 Tryon Road, Lindfield, in an old, cold flat of a two-storey mansion – across the street was a dishevelled house, peopled by short-term residents, that had its lights on all night. Davies later learned it was a half-way house for psychiatric and drug rehab patients. The first U.S. single "We Can Get Together" peaked at No. 62 on the Billboard Hot 100. A single-only release, "Love in Motion", was recorded by Davies using the Sequential Circuits Prophet 5, and became the first new recording credited to Icehouse; it hit the Australian Top 10 in November 1981. Icehouse split up late in 1981, Keith Welsh later becoming manager of Australian bands Do-Ré-Mi and Boom Crash Opera.

=== 1981–1983: Primitive Man, Fresco EP ===
In January 1982 Davies recorded Primitive Man essentially as a solo project, it was co-produced with Keith Forsey who had worked with Giorgio Moroder and later worked with Simple Minds. Forsey supplied additional percussion; Davies supplied vocals, guitars, keyboards (Prophet 5), bass and programmed the Linn drum machine. Released on September 20, 1982, as an Icehouse album, Primitive Man reached No. 3 on the National album charts and provided their international breakthrough single, "Hey Little Girl", which peaked at No. 7 in Australia, No. 2 in Switzerland, No. 5 in Germany and top 20 in UK, Sweden and Netherlands. The album was less successful in the U.S., where it peaked at number 129 on the Billboard 200 and the song "Hey Little Girl" appeared on the Billboard Top Tracks chart for one week at number 31.

Another single, "Great Southern Land", made the Australian Top 5, and was later featured in the 1988 Yahoo Serious film Young Einstein. To promote Primitive Man on tour, Davies re-assembled Icehouse with Hoste and Lloyd, and new members: Robert Kretschmer (guitar, backing vocals), Guy Pratt (bass guitar, backing vocals) and Andy Qunta (keyboards, backing vocals). Fresco was a five-track EP released in 1983 by this line-up, they supported David Bowie on the European section of his Serious Moonlight tour. Love in Motion was released in 1983 by Chrysalis for the UK market, it was the Primitive Man album with "Love in Motion" replacing album track "Break These Chains". Back in 1982, Russell Mulcahy had directed two of their video clips: "Hey Little Girl" and "Street Cafe" (released February 1983), after these Mulcahy asked Davies to record the score for his film Razorback; it was entirely instrumental, and featured Davies' first recorded use of the Australian designed Fairlight Music Computer. The trailer for the movie was released in 1983, the film itself in April 1984.

I use the Fairlight mostly, but I like the Prophet5 for harmonies. I use the Fairlight as a sort of sketchpad for arranging and editing... I've been working with a Fairlight for two and a half years now. They're built not very far away from where I live, so when they need to test out some software, I have a look at it... The first time I used a Fairlight was to do the soundtrack to Russell Mulcahy's first feature film Razorback, which is about a huge killer pig.

— Iva Davies, June 1986

=== 1984–1986: Sidewalk and Measure for Measure ===
Icehouse's third studio album Sidewalk was released in 1984 and peaked at No. 8 on the National albums chart with singles "Taking the Town" peaked at No. 29 in May, "Don't Believe Anymore" peaked at No. 31 August and "Dusty Pages" peaked at No. 82 in November. Davies used the Fairlight CMI digital sampling synthesiser exclusively.

Davies was commissioned to compose and record the score for the Sydney Dance Company production of Graeme Murphy's work Boxes. Davies only used Kretschmer, with percussion being supplied by Masaki Tanazawa. Boxes was first performed live at the Sydney Opera House on 7 November 1985. After the Boxes project, Icehouse was Davies, Kretschmer, Pratt and Qunta with former Members member Simon Lloyd (sax, trumpet, keyboards) and Steve Jansen (drums, percussion).

In 1986, their fourth studio album, Measure for Measure featured Brian Eno as an additional performer; it provided the Australian singles of "No Promises" No. 19, "Baby, You're So Strange" No. 12, "Mr. Big" No. 14 and "Cross the Border". Further inroads into the U.S. market occurred with "No Promises" peaking at No. 9 on Billboard Mainstream Rock chart and "Cross the Border" reaching No. 19. In Canada, "No Promises" reached No.61. On tour for Measure for Measure, Icehouse were Davies, Kretschmer, Lloyd and Qunta with Glenn Krawczyk on bass (replacing new member Vito Portolesi after nine shows) and Paul Wheeler on drums. On 14 August 1986 their performance at New York City's The Ritz was recorded as Icehouse: Live at the Ritz, directed by John Jopson, and broadcast on U.S. TV on 9 September 1987 and on Australian TV on 15 November 1987; it was released on VHS and NTSC formats. Jopson was subsequently used to direct four music videos for Icehouse. Stephen Morgan replaced Krawczyk on bass during 1987.

=== 1987–1989: Man of Colours and Great Southern Land ===
Iva Davies in the music video for "Electric Blue", which was co-written by Davies and John Oates

Their best-selling album is 1987's Man of Colours, which contained the Australian hit singles "Crazy" which peaked at No. 4 in July, "Electric Blue", co-written by Davies and John Oates of U.S. band Hall & Oates, peaked at No. 1 in October, "My Obsession" No. 12 in December, "Man of Colours" No. 28 in February 1988 and "Nothing Too Serious" No. 29 in May 1988. It was the first Australian album to have five singles charting in the top 30, it remained at No. 1 on the Australian album charts for eleven weeks and has sold over 700,000 copies.

In Canada, "Crazy" reached No. 22, "Electric Blue" reached No. 10, and "My Obsession" reached No. 84. With U.S. chart success for "Crazy", which reached No. 14 on the Billboard Hot 100 and No. 10 on its Mainstream Rock chart, and "Electric Blue" peaked at No. 7 Hot 100 and No. 10 Mainstream, the band had reached their zenith of popularity, the album Man of Colours reached No. 43 on the Billboard 200. Man of Colours was lauded in Australia during 1988, it won two ARIA Awards, 'Album of the Year' and 'Highest-Selling Album'. The associated song "Electric Blue" won 'Most Performed Australasian Popular Work' at the Australasian Performing Right Association (APRA) Music Awards in 1989 for its writers, Davies and Oates. The cover artwork, designed by Davies and Kretschmer, depicts a human figure holding three different coloured flowers.

In 1988, Davies and Kretschmer also wrote and recorded the track "Dance Of Life" for Yukihiro Takahashi's 1988 album Ego. The only Icehouse releases for 1989 were a single "Touch the Fire" which reached No. 13 in Australia in November and a compilation double album and video collection Great Southern Land. December 1989 saw the release of "Jimmy Dean" as a single, which reached No. 47 on the ARIA singles charts.

== 1990–present: Iva Davies and Icehouse ==
=== 1990–1992: Code Blue, Masterfile ===
Qunta left at about this time with Icehouse recording their next album, Code Blue released in October. Singles released from the album were "Big Fun" which peaked at No. 47 on the ARIA singles charts in August, "Miss Divine" at No. 16 in October and "Anything is Possible" at No. 49 in January 1991. For Code Blue recording, Icehouse were Davies, Lloyd, Morgan and Wheeler, for touring they added guitarist Paul Gildea and keyboardist Roger Mason (ex-Models). In 1992, EMI released a compilation, Masterfile containing a new version of "Love in Motion" also released as a single featuring Davies in a duet with Christina Amphlett of Divinyls.

=== 1993–1995: Full Circle, Big Wheel, and Berlin ===
Full Circle, an entire album of remixes, was recorded during 1993; it included the track "Shakin' the Cage", which was released on the Spin One EP in early 1993. This was followed by their seventh and final studio album, Big Wheel in November, which contained the singles "Satellite", released in October, and "Big Wheel", released in March 1994. The Full Circle album itself was not released until December 1994. Neither the albums nor the singles had any Top 40 chart success.

By 1995, Davies was again involved with the Sydney Dance Company, this time with their production of Berlin. The musical score was a collection of cover versions of songs by David Bowie, Brian Eno, Simple Minds, the Psychedelic Furs, Frank Sinatra, Lou Reed, Roxy Music, XTC, Talking Heads, the Velvet Underground, PiL, the Cure and Killing Joke, which saw Davies collaborating with pianist Max Lambert in the development of the music. Sessions were released as The Berlin Tapes under the name Iva Davies and Icehouse in 1995 on DIVA (Iva Davies' own label) / Massive Records for Australian release and Warner Records for international release in 2002. As well as recording the ballet score, Davies and Icehouse performed live at each performance, Berlin ran for two seasons.

During 1999, Davies, together with Richard Tognetti and Christopher Gordon, composed The Ghost of Time as an expansion of "Great Southern Land" into a forty-minute performance for Sydney's part of the worldwide millennial celebrations. On New Year's Eve in 1999, Davies (vocals, guitar), Tognetti (violin), Guy Pratt (bass), Krawczyk (drums) ROM=Pari (Taiko – Japanese drums) and Sydney Symphony Orchestra performed The Ghost of Time on the northern forecourt of Sydney Opera House alongside Sydney Harbour and was televised around the world on CNN and other news networks. Davies had released the solo album, The Ghost of Time earlier in December 1999.

=== 2001–2010: Bipolar Poems, remasters ===
Davies has been working since 2001 on a proposed Icehouse album to be titled Bi-polar Poems with certain tracks available between 2004 and 2008 from the Official Iva Davies – Icehouse website Davies has stipulated in his Will the album will not see the light of day until his death.

In 2002, The Whitlams covered "Don't Believe Anymore" from Sidewalk for their album Torch the Moon, which enjoyed moderate radio success. During 2002, Davies digitally remastered all of Flowers' and Icehouse's studio albums, adding bonus tracks to each—they were released by Warner Music Australia. In 2003, Davies contributed "Ghost of Time" and other music to the film score of the Russell Crowe epic Master and Commander: The Far Side of the World. In 2004, Heroes, which was The Berlin Tapes repackaged from the Australian and Japanese versions, was released. On 16 August 2006, Icehouse were inducted into the ARIA Hall of Fame alongside Midnight Oil, Divinyls and Rose Tattoo. Icehouse performed on 21 September 2007 with the line-up: Davies, Paul Gildea (guitars), Steve Morgan (bass), Peter Maslen (drums) and Glen Reither (keyboards, saxophone).

Icehouse / Flowers featured on Triple M's 2007 Essential Countdown with 14 songs including: "Great Southern Land" at No. 13, "Don't Believe Any More" No. 78, "Street Cafe" No. 187, "Love in Motion" No. 327, "We Can Get Together" No. 428, and "Electric Blue" No. 454.

From 15 June 2008, Davies was a judge on Seven Network TV series Battle of the Choirs. Davies commented on the status of Icehouse:

"Last year and January this year we did a couple of private, corporate shows... but as far as live touring in front of the public, we haven't done that for a very long time... It's an extremely difficult thing to have to sing for two hours and in sheer practical terms I'd have to be a lot fitter than I am now... I wrote and recorded an album a while ago. That song ["Your God Not Mine"] was written in 1998... The album [Bi-polar Poems] is in various states of unfinished, but I keep getting projects which interrupt me working on it..."

— Iva Davies, 26 June 2008

The grand final show of Battle of the Choirs, broadcast on 3 August 2008, had Icehouse provide a rare live performance of "Great Southern Land". For the performance, Icehouse were Iva Davies (vocals, guitar), Paul Wheeler (drums, percussion), Paul Gildea (guitar), David Chapman (guitar), Steve Bull (bass guitar); they were supported by the three grand-finalist choirs.

On 14 March 2009, Icehouse reformed for Sound Relief benefit concert at the Sydney Cricket Ground. Sound Relief is a benefit concert for victims of the Victorian Bushfire Crisis and the Queensland Floods. Appearing with Icehouse at the Sydney concert were, Coldplay, Eskimo Joe, Hoodoo Gurus, Jet, Josh Pyke, Little Birdy, The Presets, Wolfmother, You Am I and additional artists.

On 4 June 2009, Icehouse performed at the Sacred Heart Mission's "Heart of St Kilda Concert". The concert featured many Australian performers such as Kate Ceberano, Joe Camilleri, Dave Hughes, Mark Seymour, Mick Molloy, Tex Perkins, Tim Rogers, Corinne Grant, Ash Grunwald and Greg Fleet. On stage with Iva Davies were Paul Gildea (guitar), Paul Wheeler (drums), Steve Morgan (bass) and Glen Reither (sax/keys).

=== 2011–present: Icehouse 30th anniversary, White Heat: 30 Hits and DubHouse Live ===
On 6 April 2011, Icehouse and Universal Music Australia publicly announced a new partnership for sales and distribution of the band's material. Accompanying this were details of the planned issue of a 30th-anniversary edition of the band's debut album Icehouse. This release marked the first time any of the band's catalogue had been available for commercial download. The album was released on 20 May 2011 digitally and as a multi-disc set.

On 7 July 2011, the band issued a press release about the forthcoming release of a new greatest hits compilation, titled White Heat: 30 Hits. The album was released on 26 August 2011.

Since 2011 Icehouse has started to play regular live concerts again in Australia. One of the concerts was at the December Homebake 2011 concert, performing under the moniker of "Icehouse Plays Flowers", where they played songs from their first two albums (both released singles and unreleased songs) — "Icehouse", "We Can Get Together", "Skin", "Boulevard", "Great Southern Land" and "Sister." Keith Welsh joined them on stage, playing bass-guitar.

On 12 July 2012, the entire Icehouse studio catalogue was reissued. Primitive Man and Man of Colours also received a bonus DVD to celebrate their 30th and 25th anniversaries, respectively. The band planned to promote the two anniversary albums with the "Primitive Colours" tour.

On 4 and 7 December, Icehouse performed two shows at the Esplanade Hotel in Melbourne and the Oxford Art Factory in Sydney, respectively, under the moniker of "DubHouse performing reggae-styled versions of classic Icehouse songs and old reggae favourites". These concerts spawned the release of a live album released in January 2014. They also performed a 40th-anniversary concert at the Roche Estate, in the New South Wales Hunter Valley in March 2017.

On 9 February 2020, Icehouse played at the St. Kilda Festival in Melbourne; Flowers had played the first festival in 1980, so for the 40th anniversary Icehouse played the majority of the Flowers album plus a few covers that they would have played back then, a recording of the concert was released in October 2020 as Icehouse Plays Flowers.

In 2021, a remix of "Hey Little Girl" was released by Australian duo Mark Vick and Danny Muller, with the record credited to The Antipodeans Vs Icehouse.

In 2022, Icehouse performed "Great Southern Land" and "We Can Get Together" at the ICC Men's T20 World Cup final at Melbourne Cricket Ground, Australia.

In 2025, Icehouse, amongst other special guests, was scheduled to perform with Jimmy Barnes to celebrate the 40th anniversary of his iconic song "Working Class Man".

== Musical style ==
Icehouse's music has been classed as both new wave and rock music. Hence, AllMusic described them as "new wave rockers".

== Members ==
Current members

- Iva Davies – lead vocals, guitar, bass guitar, keyboards, oboe (1977–present)
- Paul Wheeler – drums, percussion, backing vocals (1986–present)
- Paul Gildea – guitar, backing vocals (1990–present)
- Steve Bull – bass guitar, backing vocals, 12-string guitar (1990–present)
- Michael Paynter – keyboards, guitar, backing and lead vocals (2011–present)
- Hugo Lee – saxophone, keyboards (2021–present)
- Michael Best - keyboards, additional guitars

Former members

- Keith Welsh – bass guitar, backing vocals (1977–1981)
- Ashley Sharpe – guitar (1977-1978)
- Don Brown – drums (1977–1979)
- Michael Hoste – keyboards, backing vocals (1978, 1982–1983)
- Anthony Smith (aka Adam Hall) – keyboards, backing vocals (1979–1982)
- John Lloyd – drums, percussion, backing vocals (1979–1984)
- Bob Kretschmer – guitar, backing vocals (1982–1989)
- Guy Pratt – bass guitar, backing vocals (1982–1986)
- Andy Qunta – keyboards, keytar, backing vocals, occasional guitar (1982–1988)
- Masaki Tanazawa - drums & percussion (1985-1986)
- Gary Hughes – keyboards (1983–1984)
- Simon Lloyd – saxophone, trumpet, keyboards, backing vocals (1984–1991)
- Steve Jansen – drums, percussion (1985)
- Glenn Krawczyk – bass guitar (1986)
- Steve Morgan – bass guitar, backing vocals (1987–1989)
- Roger Mason – keyboards (1989–1990)
- Tony Llewellyn – keyboards (1991–2004)
- David Chapman – guitar, keyboards, backing vocals (1993–1995)
- Max Lambert – piano (1995)
- Adrian Wallis – cello (1995–2004)
- Glenn Reither – saxophone, keyboards (2007–2021)

Timeline

== Discography ==
- Icehouse (1980) (as Flowers)
- Primitive Man (1982)
- Sidewalk (1984)
- Measure for Measure (1986)
- Man of Colours (1987)
- Code Blue (1990)
- Big Wheel (1993)
- The Berlin Tapes (1995) (as Iva Davies and Icehouse)

== Awards and nominations ==
=== ARIA Music Awards ===
The ARIA Music Awards is an annual awards ceremony that recognises excellence, innovation, and achievement across all genres of Australian music. They commenced in 1987. Icehouse were inducted into the Hall of Fame in 2006.

| Year | Nominee / work | Award | Result |
|---|---|---|---|
| 1987 | Measure for Measure | Highest Selling Album | Nominated |
| 1988 | Man of Colours | Album of the Year | Won |
| 1988 | Man of Colours | Highest Selling Album | Won |
| 1988 | Themselves | Best Group | Nominated |
| 1988 | "Crazy" | Single of the Year | Nominated |
| 1988 | "Crazy" | Song of the Year | Nominated |
| 1991 | Iva Davies and David Barnes for Code Blue by Icehouse | Best Cover Art | Nominated |
| 2006 | Themselves | ARIA Hall of Fame | inductee |

=== APRA Awards ===
The APRA Awards are held in Australia and New Zealand by the Australasian Performing Right Association to recognise songwriting skills, sales and airplay performance by its members annually.

| Year | Nominee / work | Award | Result |
|---|---|---|---|
| 1989 | "Electric Blue" (Iva Davies, John Oates) by Icehouse | Most Performed Australasian Popular Work | Won |

=== Countdown Awards ===
Countdown was an Australian pop music TV series on national broadcaster ABC-TV from 1974 to 1987; it presented music awards from 1979 to 1987, initially in conjunction with magazine TV Week. The TV Week / Countdown Awards were a combination of popular-voted and peer-voted awards.

| Year | Nominee / work | Award | Result |
|---|---|---|---|
| 1980 | Icehouse | Best Australian Album | Nominated |
| 1980 | Icehouse | Best Australian Record Cover Design | Nominated |
| 1980 | Themselves | Best New Talent | Won |
| 1980 | Iva Davies – Flowers/Icehouse | Best Recorded Songwriter | Nominated |
| 1982 | Primitive Man | Best Australian Album | Nominated |
| 1982 | "Great Southern Land" | Best Australian Single | Nominated |
| 1982 | Themselves | Most Popular Group | Nominated |
| 1982 | Iva Davies – Flowers/Icehouse | Best Recorded Songwriter | Nominated |
| 1982 | Iva Davies (Icehouse) | Most Popular Male Performer | Won |

=== Mo Awards ===
The Australian Entertainment Mo Awards (commonly known informally as the Mo Awards), were annual Australian entertainment industry awards. They recognise achievements in live entertainment in Australia from 1975 to 2016. Icehouse won one award in that time.

| Year | Nominee / work | Award | Result (wins only) |
|---|---|---|---|
| 1987 | Icehouse | Rock Group of the Year | Won |

=== Rolling Stone Australia Awards ===
The Rolling Stone Australia Awards are awarded annually in January or February by the Australian edition of Rolling Stone magazine for outstanding contributions to popular culture in the previous year.

| Year | Nominee / work | Award | Result | Ref. |
|---|---|---|---|---|
| 2025 | Icehouse | Rolling Stone Icon Award | awarded | |
