= Cameron Allan =

Australian composer (1955–2013)

- Born: Cameron Beck Allan; July 9, 1955; Melbourne, Victoria, Australia
- Origin: Sydney, New South Wales, Australia
- Died: June 25, 2013 (aged 57) Memphis, Tennessee, U.S.
- Genres: New wave; pub rock
- Occupations: Record producer; composer
- Years active: 1973–2013

Cameron Beck Allan (July 9, 1955 – June 25, 2013) was an Australian-born, America-based composer, record producer, filmmaker and former label owner. In September 1978 he co-founded the record label Regular Records with fellow filmmaker Martin Fabinyi. Their first signing was the new wave group Mental As Anything, and their second was the pub rock band Flowers. Allan produced both groups' early work. His TV and film music compositions include Stir (1980), The Umbrella Woman (1987, a.k.a. The Good Wife) Kojak: Ariana (1989), and Kojak: Flowers for Matty (1990). In 1986 he relocated to the United States and in July 1992 he married Margaret Wertheim, a science writer. The couple had separated by 2007. Cameron Allan died of liver failure, after a transplant, aged 57.

== Early life and education ==
Cameron Beck Allan was born on July 9, 1955, in Melbourne but grew up in Sydney with a younger brother, Richard.

He attended Meadowbank Boys High School and then the Sydney Conservatorium of Music.

== Career ==
While at the conservatorium he became a member of David Ahern's AZ Music ensemble, which included fellow composers Alan Holley, Robert Irving, and Carl Vine.

In July 1973 Allan published a classical music composition, Madrigal for String Orchestra, for a four-piece ensemble: violin, viola, cello, and double bass. During 1974 he provided the music arrangements for three episodes of the Australian Broadcasting Commission (ABC) TV series Ten Australians, covering Fred Williams, Michael Taylor, and Ron Robertson-Swann.

By 1978 Allan had turned to filmmaking, and teamed up with Martin Fabinyi to finance a film project, The Lipstick Killers. To raise money they formed an independent label, Regular Records, in September of that year. The first artists they signed to the label was Mental As Anything, a Sydney-based new wave music group. Allan produced their debut three-track extended play, Mental As Anything Plays at Your Party (December 1978).

According to Fabinyi, "We had no experience in the record business. This didn't faze Cameron. He was obsessively optimistic once he committed to a project. A friend at EMI gave us some time to record the band while Cameron simultaneously learnt how to work the equipment." Allan also produced Mental As Anything's first two full-length studio albums, Get Wet (November 1979) and Espresso Bongo (July 1980). Luis Feliu of The Canberra Times described how Get Wet "was recorded in Sydney and mixed in London by Cameron Allan, the band's producer, who did a great job. I couldn't pick a bad track on Get Wet and there's 14 of them."

Regular Records' second signing was the pub rock band Flowers (later renamed Icehouse); Allan co-produced their debut album, Icehouse (October 1980) with the group's leader, Iva Davies. At the TV Week / Countdown Music Awards for 1980 Allan was nominated for Best Australian Producer but lost out to Mark Opitz. Allan was the music director for the feature film Stir; at the AFI Awards of 1980 his work was nominated for Best Original Music Score, but he lost to Peter Sculthorpe.

Allan produced the Sports' fourth studio album, Sondra, after their previous two were produced by Peter Solley. According to their guitarist, Martin Armiger, "Solley was an international producer, who jetted in, and there was always a deadline of three or four weeks. In that situation you can't walk out or have a big argument; there isn't time. With Cameron, we knew we could badger him to get what we wanted, if need be. We had more time to get the sound we wanted." In 1983 Allan visited the United States, "to test the waters". Later in that decade he relocated to Los Angeles, where he worked as a TV and film music composer, although he often returned to Australia.

In June 1984 he produced the self-titled album by singer-songwriter Broderick Smith, which was issued via Wheatley Records/RCA Records. The Canberra Times' Virginia Cook felt, "[it] testifies to the successful marriage of soul and synthesiser, a marriage helped along by the expertise of producer, [Allan]... with the use of every synthesiser the production team could think of. Allan and Tim Kramer mixed the album using the Sony 1610 digital mastering system which, Smith said, gave his album a 'clean sound'." Allan described his personal record collection to Meg Stewart of The Canberra Times, in February 1986, "Mainly classical and sound tracks. I used to own a pop company (Regular Records) so there are a lot of pop records as well."

Allan provided the music score for the Australian feature film The Umbrella Woman (February 1987, a.k.a. The Good Wife) and the associated soundtrack album. At the 1987 AFI Awards he received another nomination for Best Original Music Score but lost to Paul Schütze. His work in America included music composition for The Equalizer for season four (October 1988 to August 1989); Kojak: Ariana (November 1989) and Kojak: Flowers for Matty (January 1990), two TV movies for the Kojak series (see List of Kojak episodes: TV Movies).

Allan worked on a documentary film, My Crasy Life (1991), which he co-produced with Mark Daniels: it was written by French filmmaker Jean-Pierre Gorin and investigates the lives of Samoan Americans in Long Beach's streets.

== Personal life and death ==
Allan's second marriage was to Margaret Wertheim on July 21, 1992, in Minden, Nevada. Wertheim is an Australian-born American-based science writer.

In 1998 Allan and Wertheim co-produced and co-directed a documentary, Faith & Reason, on the interaction between science and religion. The couple also co-produced and co-directed It's Jim's World ... We Just Live in It (2001) on Jim Carter and his fringe theory about physics and gravity. Allan composed its music and Wertheim was its writer. By 2007 the couple had separated.

After Allan was diagnosed with a liver disease, he received a transplant. He died in June 2013, aged 57.

== Discography ==
- Block (by Carl Vine and Cameron Allan) (1975)
- Broderick Smith (by Broderick Smith, produced by Cameron Allan) (June 1984)

== Filmography ==
- Ten Australians: Fred Williams (Cameron Allan as music arranger) (TV series, 1974)
- Ten Australians: Michael Taylor (Cameron Allan as music arranger) (TV series, 1974)
- Ten Australians: Ron Robertson-Swann (Cameron Allan as music arranger) (TV series, 1974)
- The Night the Prowler (Cameron Allan as music director) (feature film, June 1978)
- Stir (Cameron Allan as music director) (feature film, October 1980)
- Hoodwink (Cameron Allan as music director) (feature film, November 1981)
- Heatwave (Cameron Allan as music director) (feature film, 1982)
- Midnite Spares (Cameron Allan as music director) (feature film, 1983)
- Faith & Reason (by Ronald Bailey, Cameron Allan and Margaret Wertheim) (VHS documentary, 1998)
