= Regular Records =

- Founded: 1978
- Founder: Martin Fabinyi, Cameron Allan
- Status: Defunct
- Genre: Rock; pop
- Country of origin: Australia
- Location: Sydney

Regular Records was an Australian record label based in Sydney that operated from 1978 until the mid-1990s. Regular Records released music by acts including Mental As Anything, Icehouse, and The Cockroaches.

The Regular Records label was founded in 1978 by Martin Fabinyi and Cameron Allan. The label was associated with music recording and publishing company Festival Records.

The act first signed to the label was Mental as Anything. The second act signed to label was "Flowers" who later changed their name to Icehouse. Regular signed Brisbane band The Riptides in 1981. In 1986 Regular signed The Cockroaches, who later went on to form the nucleus of The Wiggles. Acts also signed to Regular included I'm Talking, Electric Pandas and The Reels. In the early 1990s, Regular signed Sydney band The Welcome Mat, and distributed the independent label Half a Cow.

Cameron Allan died in 2013.

== Artists signed to label ==
- Mental As Anything
- Flowers/Icehouse
- Austen Tayshus
- Stephen Cummings
- Electric Pandas
- The Reels
- The Cockroaches
- I'm Talking
- Kate Ceberano
- The Johnnys
- The Riptides
- Club Hoy
- Third Eye
- SPK
- Dog Trumpet
- Tiny Tim
- Deckchairs Overboard
- Cattletruck
- Regular Rockabilly
