= Iva Davies =

Australian electronic musician and rock singer

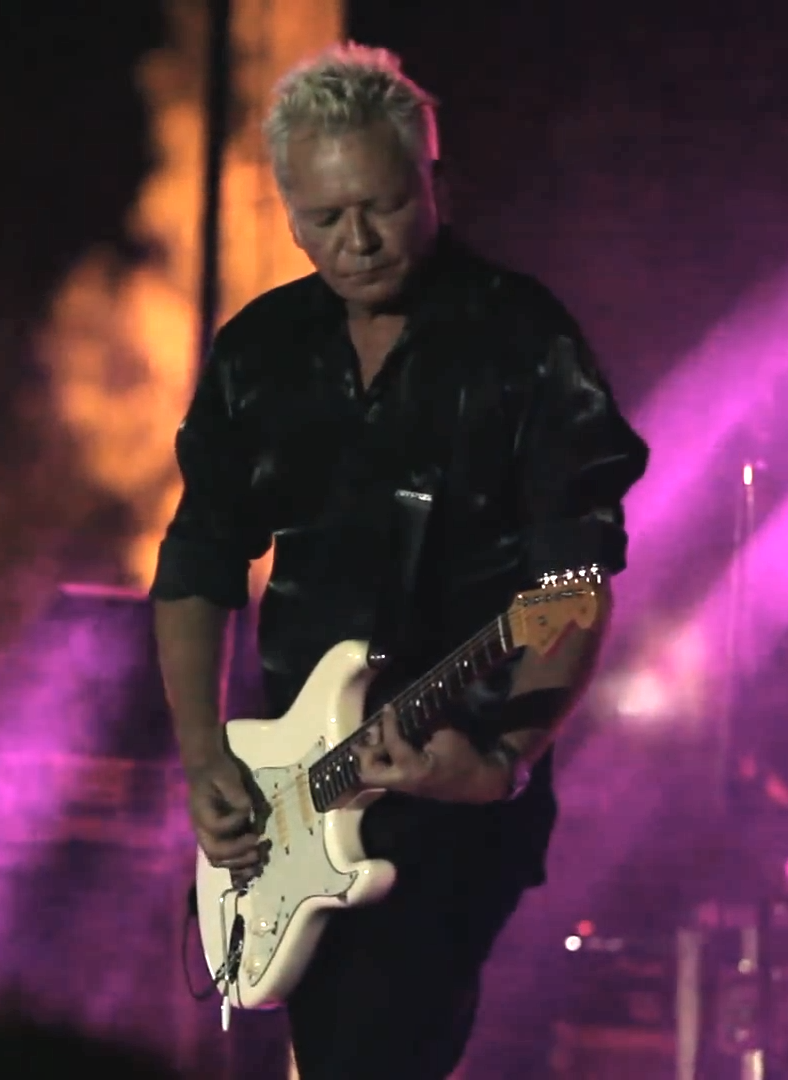
- Davies performing at the Alice Springs Masters Games in 2012

Background information
- Born: Ivor Arthur Davies; 22 May 1955 (age 71); Wauchope, New South Wales, Australia
- Genres: Rock; new wave; synth-pop
- Occupations: Singer; songwriter; composer; multi-instrumentalist; record producer; music programmer
- Instruments: Vocals; guitar; oboe; keyboards; synthesizer; cor anglais
- Years active: 1971–present
- Labels: Regular; Diva
- Member of: Icehouse
- Website: icehouse-ivadavies.com

Ivor Arthur Davies, AM (born 22 May 1955), known professionally as Iva Davies, is an Australian singer, songwriter, composer, multi-instrumentalist and record producer.

Davies' music career spans more than 50 years. He came to prominence in the early 1980s as co-founder and lead singer of rock band Icehouse, becoming one of Australia's top rock stars of that decade.

In addition to his work with Icehouse and his solo career, Davies has made music for television series and films. He is known for his work as composer for the film Master and Commander: The Far Side of the World.

== Early life ==
Davies was born on 22 May 1955 in Wauchope, New South Wales, and was first attracted to bagpipes at the age of six. He played oboe with the Sydney Youth Orchestra and was a member of the Epping Boys High School Band where he also played the euphonium. He went on to be an oboe and composition student at the New South Wales Conservatorium of Music, but dropped out at age 21 to pursue a professional career.

== Career ==
=== 1970s ===
Davies first performed professionally as a 16-year-old musician with the Lucy Fields Jug Band. The band secured a recording contract with M7 Records, but the company changed hands shortly thereafter and the band's album was never released. In 1974, Davies performed Handel's Concerto for Oboe in E♭ major with Strathfield Symphony Orchestra, conducted by Richard Gill. Davies would later use his woodwind skills on some tracks with his band Icehouse, playing oboe on several albums and adding cor anglais to "Man of Colours", the title track of their sixth studio album.

In July 1975, Davies (Iva Davies and Afghan) released his first single, “Leading Lady”, on the RCA label.

In early 1977, Davies was working as a part-time cleaner at a squash court in Lindfield, New South Wales managed by bass player Keith Welsh's mother. Davies and Welsh got together to form the band Flowers, rehearsing in a house next door to the squash court. In 1977, Davies re-established an old acquaintance with Cameron Allan, the director of Sydney-based independent label Regular Records; Flowers signed with the label in early 1977. In 1980, the band's debut album Icehouse, which included the song "Can't Help Myself", reached the Top Five, making it the highest-selling debut album in Australia. On a UK tour to promote the album, Davies became aware of a pre-existing Scottish band called "The Flowers", to avoid confusion the band changed its name to Icehouse in 1981. The name was taken from a cold flat Davies lived in and the strange building across the road populated by itinerant people.

=== 1980s ===
In 1983, Davies and Icehouse went on a European tour with David Bowie.

In 1984, Davies was invited to Japan to write the lyrics and sing vocals for the track "Walking To The Beat" by Yukihiro Takahashi, for the album Wild & Moody. The following year "Walking To The Beat" was released as a single in Australia, New Zealand and the Netherlands. In 1985 Davies briefly joined Takahashi's touring band in Japan for the "Wild & Moody" tour, where he met Steve Jansen.

In 1985, Davies and fellow Icehouse member Bob Kretschmer worked on the ballet Boxes with the Sydney Dance Company. In addition to scoring the ballet, they also co-wrote the script with Graeme Murphy. Boxes opened at the Sydney Opera House in December, and Davies performed in an acting/singing/dancing role to sold-out crowds for three weeks straight. 1985 also saw Davies win an APRA Music Award for Most Performed Australasian Music for Film for Razorback. Davies was an early adopter of the Fairlight which he used to compose the music of the film. His score has been described as "pioneering" and "an important contribution to Australian film scoring".

In 1988, Davies and co-collaborator John Oates won an APRA Music Award for the Icehouse song "Electric Blue" (from the Man of Colours album) in the Most Performed Australasian Popular Work category. On 25 January 1988, Icehouse performed "Electric Blue" at the Royal Command, New South Wales Bicentennial Concert in front of the Prince and Princess of Wales at the Sydney Entertainment Centre.

=== 1990s ===
In the early 1990s, the Sydney Dance Company worked on creating a work which became the ballet Berlin. As well as recording the score to the ballet, Davies performed live with Icehouse at each show. Berlin was an instant success and ran for two seasons.

=== 2000s ===
In 2003, Davies travelled to Los Angeles to record the soundtrack to the Peter Weir film Master and Commander: The Far Side of the World with Christopher Gordon and Richard Tognetti. Together, they won the 2004 APRA/AGSC Screen Music Award in the Best Soundtrack Album category.

In 2005, Davies scored the miniseries The Incredible Journey of Mary Bryant. On 6 November 2006, he won the 2006 APRA/AGSC Screen Music Award in the Best Music for a Mini-Series or Telemovie category. From 15 June 2008, Davies was a judge on Seven Network TV series Battle of the Choirs; his band Icehouse performed "Great Southern Land" on the grand final show won by the University of Newcastle Chamber Choir.

== Personal life ==
Davies lives in Whale Beach, New South Wales. He married Tonia Kelly in 1990; at the time, Kelly was the principal dancer at the Sydney Dance Company. The couple divorced in 2010. From his marriage to Kelly, he has two children, Brynn (born 1993) and Evan (born 1996).

== Discography ==
This is a discography of Davies's solo work; see Icehouse discography for his work with that group.

=== Albums ===
List of albums, with Australian chart positions
| Title | Album details | Peak chart positions | |
| Title | Album details | AUS | NZ |
|---|---|---|---|
| Razorback (Music from the Original Soundtrack of the Film) | Released: 1984; Format: LP, Cassette; Label: EMI Records Australia (P-430006) | - | - |
| Boxes (with Sydney Dance Company) | Released: November 1985; Format: CD, Cassette; Label: Festival Records (CD 38744) | - | - |
| The Berlin Tapes (with Icehouse) | Released: 1995; Format: CD; Label: Massive, Roadshow Music (17511-2) | - | 47 |
| The Ghost of Time | Released: 1999; Format: CD; Label: Roadshow Music, Diva (102459-2) | 63 | |
| The Far Side of the World (with Christopher Gordon & Richard Tognetti) | Released: 2003; Format: CD, Cassette; Label: Decca, UMG Soundtracks (475 398-2) | - | - |

== Awards and nominations ==
In 2013, Davies was honoured in the Queen's Birthday Honours as a "Member (AM) in the General Division" for services to music, entertainment and the community

=== APRA Awards ===
The APRA Awards are held in Australia and New Zealand by the Australasian Performing Right Association to recognise songwriting skills, sales and airplay performance by its members annually.

| Year | Nominee / work | Award | Result |
|---|---|---|---|
| 1986 | Razorback | Most Performed Australasian Music for Film | Won |
| 1989 | "Electric Blue" (Iva Davies, John Oates) by Icehouse | Most Performed Australasian Popular Work | Won |
| 2004 | Master and Commander: The Far Side of the World (Iva Davies, Christopher Gordon, Richard Tognetti) | Best Feature Film Score | Nominated |
| 2004 | Master and Commander: The Far Side of the World (Iva Davies, Christopher Gordon, Richard Tognetti) | Best Soundtrack Album | Won |
| 2006 | The Incredible Journey of Mary Bryant (Iva Davis) | Best Music for a Mini-Series or Telemovie | Won |

=== ARIA Music Awards ===
The ARIA Music Awards is an annual awards ceremony that recognises excellence, innovation, and achievement across all genres of Australian music. They commenced in 1987.

| Year | Nominee / work | Award | Result | Ref. |
|---|---|---|---|---|
| 1996 | The Berlin Tapes | Best Original Soundtrack, Cast or Show Album | Nominated | |
| 2000 | The Ghost of Time | Best Original Soundtrack, Cast or Show Album | Nominated | |

=== Australian Songwriters Hall of Fame ===
The Australian Songwriters Hall of Fame was established in 2004 to honour the lifetime achievements of some of Australia's greatest songwriters.

| Year | Nominee / work | Award | Result |
|---|---|---|---|
| 2018 | himself | Australian Songwriters Hall of Fame | inducted |

=== TV Week / Countdown Awards ===
Countdown was an Australian pop music TV series on national broadcaster ABC-TV from 1974 to 1987; it presented music awards from 1979 to 1987, initially in conjunction with magazine TV Week. The TV Week / Countdown Awards were a combination of popular-voted and peer-voted awards.

| Year | Nominee / work | Award | Result |
|---|---|---|---|
| 1980 | himself | Best Recorded Songwriter | Nominated |
| 1982 | himself | Best Songwriter | Nominated |
| 1982 | himself | Best Australian Producer | Nominated |
| 1982 | himself | Most Popular Male Performer | Won |
| 1984 | himself | Most Popular Male Performer | Nominated |
