= Francis Hill Sewell =

British clergyman and philanthropist

The Reverend Francis Hill Sewell (1815–1862) was a clergyman and philanthropist who was largely responsible for the rebuilding and restoration of All Saints Church, Lindfield in the parish of Lindfield, Sussex, today a Grade II* Listed Building. In 1848 Sewell graduated from Caius College Cambridge and became the Curate of All Saints, where he contributed more than £650 of his own money towards the estimated £2,000 total needed, engaging the architect John Henry Taylor to oversee the restoration of the building to its 14th Century splendour. Sewell was also responsible for the foundation of the National School in Lindfield in 1851.

== Early life ==
Sewell was born in India in 1815, the second son of Major General Robert Sewell, a governor of the East India Company, and his wife Eliza Serena Macnaghten, daughter of Sir Francis Workman-Macnachten, 1st Baronet. Over the course of the 18th Century the Sewell family had grown influential and wealthy, initially from the practice of law and later through military service, politics and landownership, including plantations in the West Indies. He studied at and graduated from Gonville and Caius Colleges at Cambridge University in 1839.

== Career ==
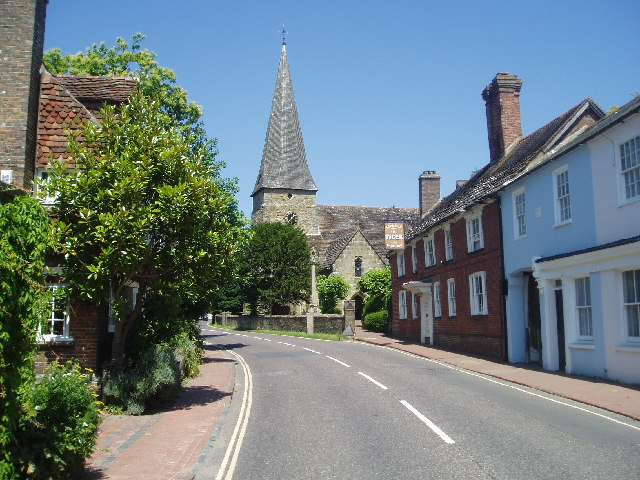
All Saints Church viewed from Lindfield High St

Sewell was intended for the army but instead he pursued a career in the church, owing to his "gentleness of disposition". After graduating from Cambridge in 1839 he was ordained into the clergy and was appointed curate of All Saints Church, Lindfield, where he remained the incumbent until his death in 1862. Lindfield at this time was "utterly neglected" and "no part of England was more desolate".

Shortly after arriving in Lindfield, Sewell's elder brother died, and Francis Sewell came into "possession of a moderate fortune", an income of "many tens of thousands of pounds" as well as an estate bordering Ashdown Forest comprising several farms of around 600 acres, as well as a substantial house at Twyford.

=== All Saints' Church, Lindfield ===
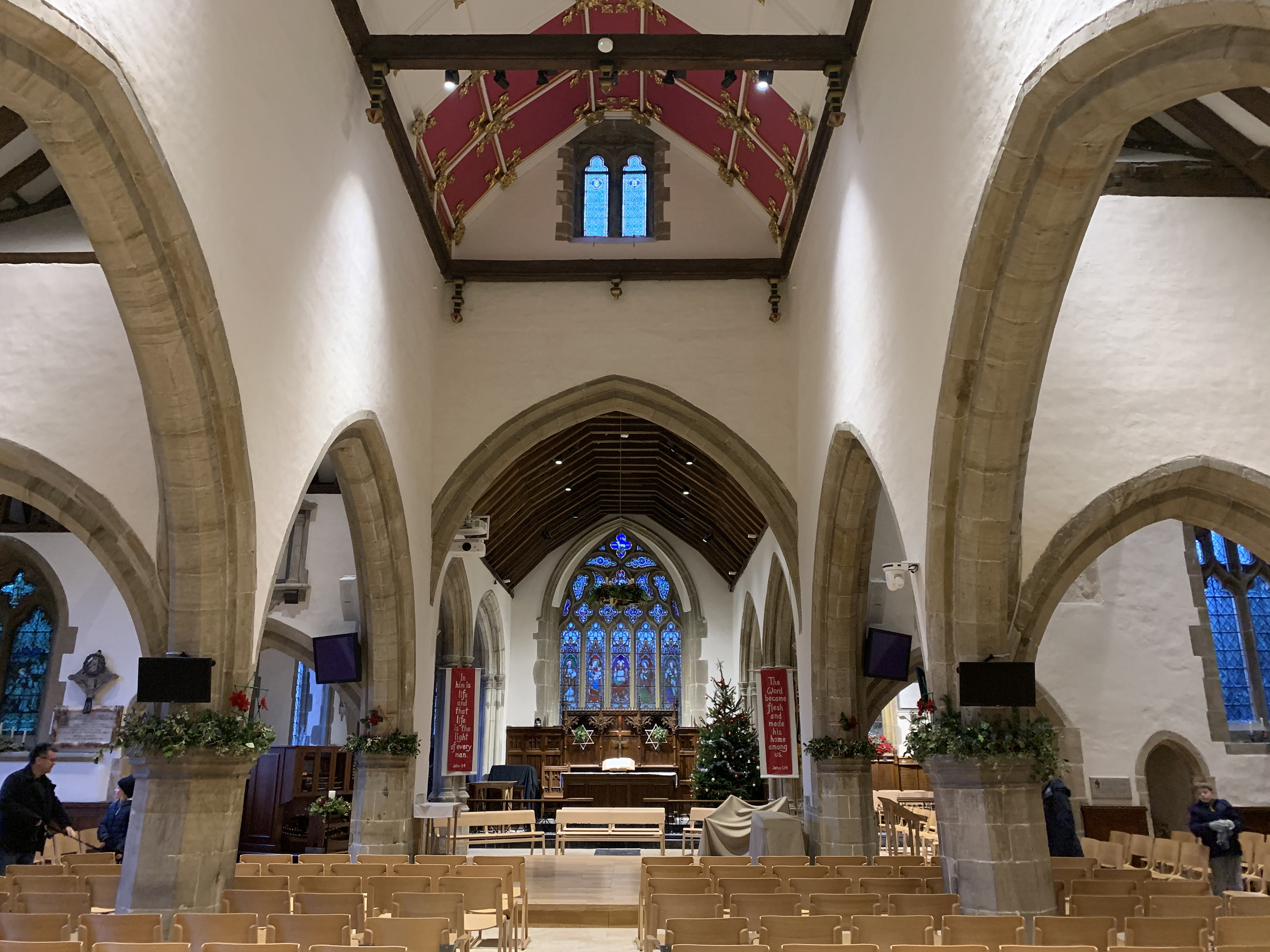
Interior of All Saints' Church, Lindfield

By the mid-19th Century All Saints Church, Lindfield had fallen into disrepair and rectoral tithes remained low at just £35 per annum. This sorry state of affairs changed with Sewell's appointment; the new curate brought a "Victorian reformer's zeal" to the welfare and restoration of the church.

In 1847 the view of the influential Cambridge Camden Society was that: "The whole [church] was in a most wretched condition and the only wonder is that in the miserably peculiar circumstances of the parish any restoration should be attempted at all. All that is at present done, which is merely a restoration of the greater part of the windows, is done well; the horrible arrangement of the church is at present not touched".

Sewell himself contributed more than £650 of his own money towards the estimated £2,000 total needed. Sewell engaged the architect John Henry Taylor to restore the building to its 14th Century origins. The work took place between 1848 and 1850, by which time the church was fully restored.

=== National School ===
Sewell also contributed to the education of children in Lindfield by instigating the building of a National School, which opened on Lindfield Common in 1851.

== Death and legacy ==
Sewell died in 1862.
