= Tryon Road Uniting Church =

- Lindfield Uniting Church
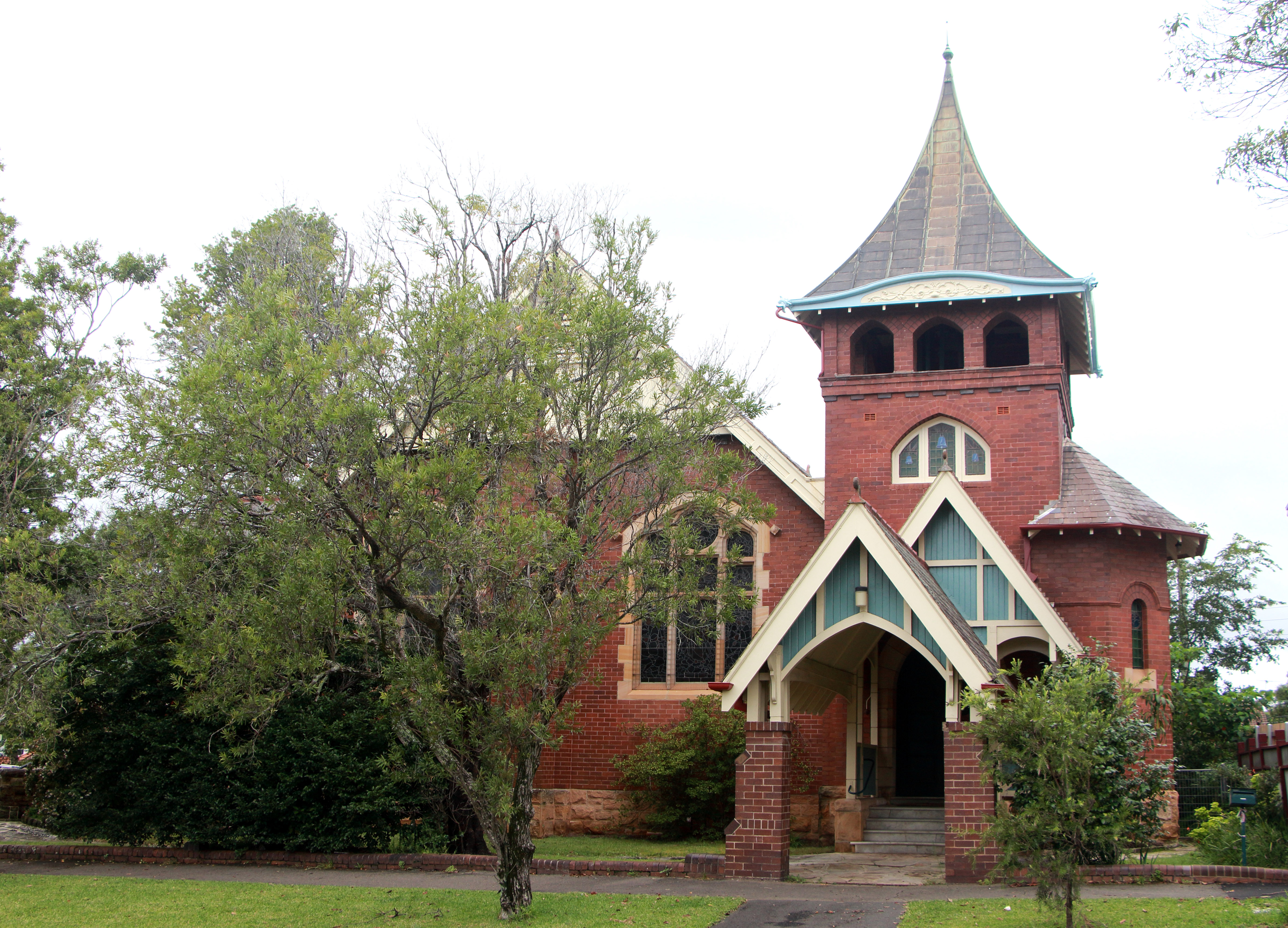
- Tryon Road Uniting Church, 2019
- Tryon Road Uniting Church
- 33°46′28″S 151°10′22″E
- Location: 33 Tryon Road, Lindfield, Ku-ring-gai Council, New South Wales
- Country: Australia
- Denomination: Uniting Church in Australia
- Previous denomination: Methodist

History
- Former name: Lindfield Wesleyan Methodist Church
- Status: Church
- Dedication: 19 September 1914

Architecture
- Functional status: Active
- Architect: William Slade
- Architectural type: Church
- Style: Gothic Revival; Arts and Craft; Art Nouveau
- Years built: 1914

Administration
- Parish: Lindfield

New South Wales Heritage Register
- Official name: Tryon Road Uniting Church; Lindfield Wesleyan Methodist Church
- Type: State heritage (built)
- Designated: 19 September 2003
- Reference no.: 1672
- Type: Church
- Category: Religion
- Builders: W. 'Ossie' Knowles

Tryon Road Uniting Church is a heritage-listed Uniting church located at 33 Tryon Road in the Sydney suburb of Lindfield in the Ku-ring-gai Council local government area of New South Wales, Australia. It was designed by William Slade and built in 1914 by W. "Ossie" Knowles. It was also known as Lindfield Wesleyan Methodist Church. The property is owned by the Uniting Church in Australia. It was added to the New South Wales State Heritage Register on 19 September 2003.

== History ==
=== General history ===
A comprehensive history of the Methodists in the area and the chapels they built is given in A Cloud of Witnesses at Tryon Road Uniting Church by Geoffrey Stacey, 1996, published by the Lindfield Tryon Road Uniting Church Centenary Committee.

Lindfield became the name of the area after it was adopted for the name for the station on the new railway line linking St Leonards and Hornsby in 1890. The name was taken from a cottage of that name built by Francis John List who came from Lindfield, West Sussex in southern England. Tryon Road may have been named after Rear Admiral Sir George Tryon, commander in the Australian Navy in the 1880s. It is suggested that he was a friend or relative of List.

In the early 1890s, as the expansion of the North Shore got under way following the building of the railway in 1890, the decision to build a church in the Willoughby/Lindfield Methodist circuit was made. Land was purchased from Thomas Todd Forsyth (who held part of an original Crown Grant of 1819 to Daniel Dering Mathew) by seven members of the congregation. This plot was just south of the Gordon Road (now Pacific Highway) entry to the Lindfield railway station. No drawings or plans of this church exist but a photograph and description is given in the book mentioned above. The church was formally opened on 19 April 1896. After a disappointing start where numbers attending services were not as hoped by the Trustees, numbers climbed to a point where the congregation began discussing the need for a new church.

=== History of the church ===
After long debate it was decided to purchase land on the corner of Tryon and Nelson Roads. After further debate it was decided to build both church and halls at the same time. The architect, Mr Slade, is noted as being persuasive of building a complete set of facilities rather than wait until funds became available. Reported in The Methodist of 1914:

Eventually a bold policy was determined upon viz: to make provision for all needs by erecting church, school hall, Kindergarten, and class rooms in one effort, and to face a correspondingly heavy debt as a result of having a good equipment for church work all round.

The church was formally opened on 19 September 1914 at a Special Public Meeting and Service. The architect of these new buildings was William Slade and the builder was W. O. J. Knowles. Slade (1847-1935) was the half brother of church trustee Percy Newman Slade. He was born in Surry Hills but trained as an architect in England. On his return it seems he worked for Harry Kent. Slade designed the Roseville Methodist Church in Cardigan Street, Camperdown (now the Camperdown Stanmore Community Church of the Assembly of Confessing Congregations).

The Slades were a prominent family of Methodists and they had particular interests in Tryon Road: Percy Newman Slade (1972-1944) had settled in the Lindfield area at the commencement of his professional career as an accountant and real estate agent. Percy was prominent in the Methodist Church, being an original trustee of the local church and financial adviser to the Central Methodist Mission. In 1895 he married Claudia Brown, the daughter of Dr George Brown, a former Methodist missionary in the South Pacific. Percy settled at Malila at No. 13-15 Tryon Road in 1906. Percy's elder sister, Kate Watkin (1864-1944), developed the properties at No. 23-25 Tryon Road around the same time. No. 17 Tryon Road was owned and developed around 1906 by Louisa Slade, Percy's widowed mother.

William Slade's architectural drawings do not seem to have survived, but good written descriptions of the fabric of the church as completed are available. At the time of the opening in 1914, the correspondent for The Methodist described the church as follows:

"The combined church and school hall buildings occupy a corner site, having a length of 107 ft to Tryon Road and 180 ft to Nelson Road with a lane at the rear. A certain freedom of treatment is observable throughout: while based on the British Gothic, is made to suit the climatic conditions of Australia; the overhanging eaves and gables, porches, and covered way, at main entrance, suggesting coolness and shade. Breadth of treatment and repose has been gained and although the buildings are considerably spread out, form a pleasing grouping as a whole.

The main material used in the building is brick, relieved by stone-dressings introduced at openings, and with a high stone base course throughout. The brickwork is tuck-pointed, such parts usually plastered inside are tuck-pointed also. The elevation to Tryon Rd shows a fine gable with large triplet windows of leaded coloured glass in original designs, on the south side is the turret, containing a fine toned bell, and on the north side a large porch, each giving access to the main building. The interior of the church which is 1.8 metres (6 ft) by 10.8 metres (35.5 ft) is lit from the sides by eight windows, each of to lancets and circle grouped and filled with leaded coloured glass, similar to the front. The ceiling of the interior is formed by the line of collar ties in the centre and lower portions of principals at the sides - furring pieces being introduced to form a continuous clear line from end to end, relieved by moulded ribs and panelling. Delicate tie rods span the whole. The average height of the ceiling of the church is 7.6 metres (25 ft). That of the school hall is 18 ft; being treated somewhat in the manner as described of the church. A sloping floor is provided for the church - the average height of the interior walls from the floor being 5.0 metres (16.5 ft). Accommodation is provided for 350 persons with an additional 25 persons in the choir; which is semi-circular and raised in steps on a platform extending across the end of the church, one side of which is occupied by an ornamental rostrum. The seats throughout are of Queensland kauri, having ornamental stall ends, slightly stained and varnished. A sliding door leading from the end of the church opens into the school block attached, which comprises a hall 13 metres (42 ft) by 10.2 metres (33.5 ft), with a raised platform, six class rooms, 1 square metre (10 sq ft); grouped about the same. The infant's room also being 6.9 metres (22.5 ft) by 6.2 metres (20.5 ft), and a sewing room 1 square metre (10 sq ft).

The library and principal porch of the school are grouped, being a small semi-octagonal wing forming a pleasing feature on the Nelson Road frontage. Minister and choir vestries, with separate external entrances are provided, and appurtances throughout for the complete carrying out of all functions of a public and social nature.

The roofs externally are covered with slates except the turret, which is one of Muntz metal, finished with a finial. The porches are tiled and the entrance steps are of marble, with wing walls of stone. The alignment of the Tryon and Nelson Roads is formed by ornamental open fencing and brick dwarf walling." The outlay of A£5,600 included the cost of installing an organ that had originated in Ireland, having been imported into the colony for use in the original St Mary's Cathedral, Sydney.

The major alteration to the church Slade designed occurred in 1935 following a resolution of 1934 to change the altar area and relocate the organ from the front in the sanctuary to a new purpose designed organ chamber within a transept. In the remodelling of the sanctuary a new wood panelled reredos was fitted and the communion rails extended forward at the sides. The pulpit was retained in its original position, but the babtismal font was reset. The choir was enlarged to accommodate 42. The architect was N. S. W. McPherson.

Eight chimes were installed in the tower in 1936 as a memorial to Walter J Cryer. Another five were added in 1940 as a memorial to Mrs Agnes Cryer.

Following amalgamation of the Methodist Church with the Presbyterian and Congregationalist churches as the Uniting Church of Australia in 1977, the church has continued to be used by the local congregation.

=== Organ history ===
The organ began life in Ireland and was imported for use in St Mary's Cathedral, Sydney. Purchased by the Wesleyan Methodists for the Macquarie Street Chapel in 1839 and later removed to the York Street Chapel. It was rebuilt by C. J. Jackson in 1868 and further enlarged by William Davidson in 1888. When the York Street Chapel was replaced by the Centenary Hall the organ was rebuilt therein in 1903 by George Fincham & Son of Melbourne. It became one of the largest organs in New South Wales (the only larger ones at that time were in Sydney Town Hall, St Andrew's Cathedral and St Saviours Cathedral, Goulburn). In 1908 it was moved to the "Conference Hall" in Castlereagh Street and remained there until it was purchased by the Tryon Road Methodist Church in Lindfield. It was moved from the front of the church in the Sanctuary to the purpose built organ transept in 1935. The organ was rebuilt and restored in 2001 and now occupies a slightly larger area. The facing organ pipes are now polychromatic as they were when the organ was erected in the Centenary Hall in York Street.

== Description ==
The complex consists of the Church (orientated on a north-west to south-east axis) and two adjoining halls with ancillary rooms at its south-east end. The complex sits on a corner site bounded on the northern side by Tryon Road, the eastern by Nelson Road and the southern by Tryon Lane. On the north-east side towards Nelson Road is a large Hill's fig tree (Ficus microcarpa var.Hillii) and crazy-paved sandstone driveway half loop.

The complex was designed and built as a whole in 1914, with the exception of a 1935 transept on the north-east (detailed to match the church), and a small modern extension containing toilets which sits at the western end of the smaller hall.

The building is Federation Gothic Revival in style with Arts and Craft and Art Nouveau influences. The building is constructed of red tuck-pointed brickwork with sandstone dressings to all openings, the whole sitting on a rusticated sandstone base. Contrasting blue bricks are used in the arched heads over windows and on the double curved tops of the buttresses. Moulded bricks are also used for string-courses and as decorative elements. The detailing throughout is well considered and of very high quality. The roof, which is generally gabled in form, is of grey slate with terra cotta ridge and hip cappings.

The main entrance to the church off Tryon Road includes a covered way from the street to a flight of marble steps leading up to the front door, over which rises a squat tower. The tower roof is bell-caste in form, clad in copper sheet with curved decorative pressed metal panels to the eaves fascias. Gargoyles shed water from the four corners of the roof. The porch is tiled with small mosaic tiles (c. 1930s). A stair leads up into the bell ringers chamber. The tower contains a single bell and a carillion of 8 tubular bells in an open chamber under the tower roof. The windows to the tower include Art Nouveau leadlight.

The timber floor of the church slopes down from the entry to the chancel area. The walls are of face brick with a plaster dado panel, topped by a timber dado rail at sill height. The ceiling features decorative fibrous plaster panels with moulded battening. Tie rods extend across the width of the church at regular intervals. The windows within the church are generally of high quality stained glass, set in quoined sandstone surrounds. The chancel is raised on a stepped platform.

The pews are of stained and polished timber. The balustrading and communion rail to the chancel area, choir stalls and former font enclosure is all of a matching design featuring pointed arched panels and brackets. The raised pulpit features panels in the shape of shields. There is also a matching lectern and a marble font. A very tall and elaborately panelled timber reredos is set against the painted battened fibro rear wall of the chancel. The first organ was originally set against this, but has been replaced by a timber altar table (c. 1935). Other chancel furniture includes a communion table and chairs.

A very fine restored organ of considerable historic interest (refer to history) is built into a transept extension (1935) on the eastern side of the chancel.

Two vestries connect the church to two halls at the rear, one larger Sunday school hall and a second kindergarten hall. These spaces, together with their ancillary spaces generally have timber floors and plastered walls and battened fibrous plaster ceilings, painted. At the rear of the large hall are three smaller spaces for the meeting of small groups, which are original to the design. One of these has since been enclosed as an office. A small library room was included just off the main entrance porch to this hall, the window through which the books were borrowed still existing. Opposite this entry is another door with a flight of steps leading down to the rear yard. The western end of the hall contains a raised stage. A modern toilet extension has been built off the smaller hall, cutting through the original windows in this wall.

=== Condition ===
As at 30 May 2003, the church was generally in good condition. There is evidence of salt attack in the walls of the organ transept and east wall of the church. The archaeological potential is unknown. The whole church and hall complex has a very high degree of integrity. The original buildings are substantially intact with the 1935 alterations and additions to the organ and chancel area complementing the original in both style and quality. The later additions to the rear of the small hall have minimal impact on the whole.

=== Modifications and dates ===
- 1935 - new organ chamber installed and organ moved from Sanctuary (N W McPherson Architect)
- 1990s - toilet and store extension

== Heritage listing ==
As at 9 August 2011, the Tryon Road Uniting Church, constructed in 1914 in the Federation Gothic style with Arts & Crafts influences, is of aesthetic significance at the State level. Externally and internally, the church complex is an unspoiled instance of Australian Edwardian design. Harmonious furnishings and stained glass from distinguished Sydney firms contribute to a beautiful interior, and enhance its Arts & Crafts design. The organ has historic, social and technical significance at State level. It comprises pipework from an early Irish organ used at St Mary's Cathedral, Sydney, in 1839, purchased for the Wesleyan Church first in Macquarie Street and later York Street; it was rebuilt and enlarged at different times by the important Sydney builders Charles Jackson and William Davidson and the great Melbourne firm of George Fincham & Sons. It is a rare instrument with unusual size and power, and interesting tonal character. The organ case is of cedar and possesses unusually high quality design and workmanship. It has been restored. The complex comprises church and hall and is of local significance for its social associations with Lindfield from the early years of the suburb to the present time. It is a rare instance of church premises designed by the Roseville architect William Slade, who also designed the Roseville Uniting Church, and many other local buildings in the late nineteenth and early twentieth centuries.

Tryon Road Uniting Church was listed on the New South Wales State Heritage Register on 19 September 2003 having satisfied the following criteria.

The place is important in demonstrating the course, or pattern, of cultural or natural history in New South Wales.

Tryon Road Methodist church is of historical significance as part of the story of the growth of the North Shore suburbs in the early 20th century. This church replaced an earlier Methodist church which stood on another site nearby. The church contains an organ of great historic significance, the first portion originally being imported from Ireland for St Mary's Cathedral in 1839, it contains a significant amount of pre 1870s pipework which is rare in Australia. It is also one of the largest nineteenth century pipe organs in NSW.

The place has a strong or special association with a person, or group of persons, of importance of cultural or natural history of New South Wales's history.

Tryon Road Methodist Church is associated with the Architect William Slade and the local builder W O J Knowles. Slade is also known for his design of the Roseville Methodist Church 1907. The organ has been rebuilt by several organ builders of note including C.J. Jackson, William Davidson and George Fincham & Son.

The place is important in demonstrating aesthetic characteristics and/or a high degree of creative or technical achievement in New South Wales.

The buildings are of considerable aesthetic significance as a well-preserved and finely detailed example of a church in the Federation Gothic style, incorporating Arts and Crafts and Art Nouveau influences, particularly in the tower roof. The furnishings and stained-glass windows, produced by notable Sydney firms, complement the architecture and contribute to the overall character of the place.

The place has a strong or special association with a particular community or cultural group in New South Wales for social, cultural or spiritual reasons.

The site has social significance as a place of worship and in community use for 88 years on this site (and over 100 in Lindfield).

The place has potential to yield information that will contribute to an understanding of the cultural or natural history of New South Wales.

The organ has a high degree of technical and research significance, comprising pipework from the original Irish organ, and having been enlarged and rebuilt several times by significant organ builders. The most recent work was carried out in 2001 and the organ is in excellent working order.

The place possesses uncommon, rare or endangered aspects of the cultural or natural history of New South Wales.

The church is a rare example of a pre-World War I church and hall complex, including all ancillary facilities, being constructed all at one time and within one building. It is also a rare example of Federation Gothic church with high quality Arts and Craft and Art Nouveau detailing.

The place is important in demonstrating the principal characteristics of a class of cultural or natural places/environments in New South Wales.

The church and hall complex is representative of the strong church - community relationship in the growing North Shore suburbs prior to World War I, and the commitment of the Methodist Church to providing facilities for community use, this being a major influence on the design of the complex and the decision to build all the facilities as a whole.

== See also ==
- Methodist Church of Australasia
- Wesleyan Methodist Church of Australia
