= Peter Keith =

Peter Meredith Keith was an Anglican priest in New Zealand in the 20th century.

Keith served with the New Zealand Armed Forces during the Second World War. He was educated at Ridley Hall, Cambridge. He was ordained a deacon in 1946 and a priest in 1948. After a curacy in Alverstoke he went to New Zealand. After another curacy in Lower Hutt he held incumbencies at Miramar and Gonville. He was Sub Dean of Holy Trinity Cathedral, Auckland from 1962 to 1966; and Archdeacon of Nelson, New Zealand from 1966 to 1976.
