= All Saints Church, Lindfield =

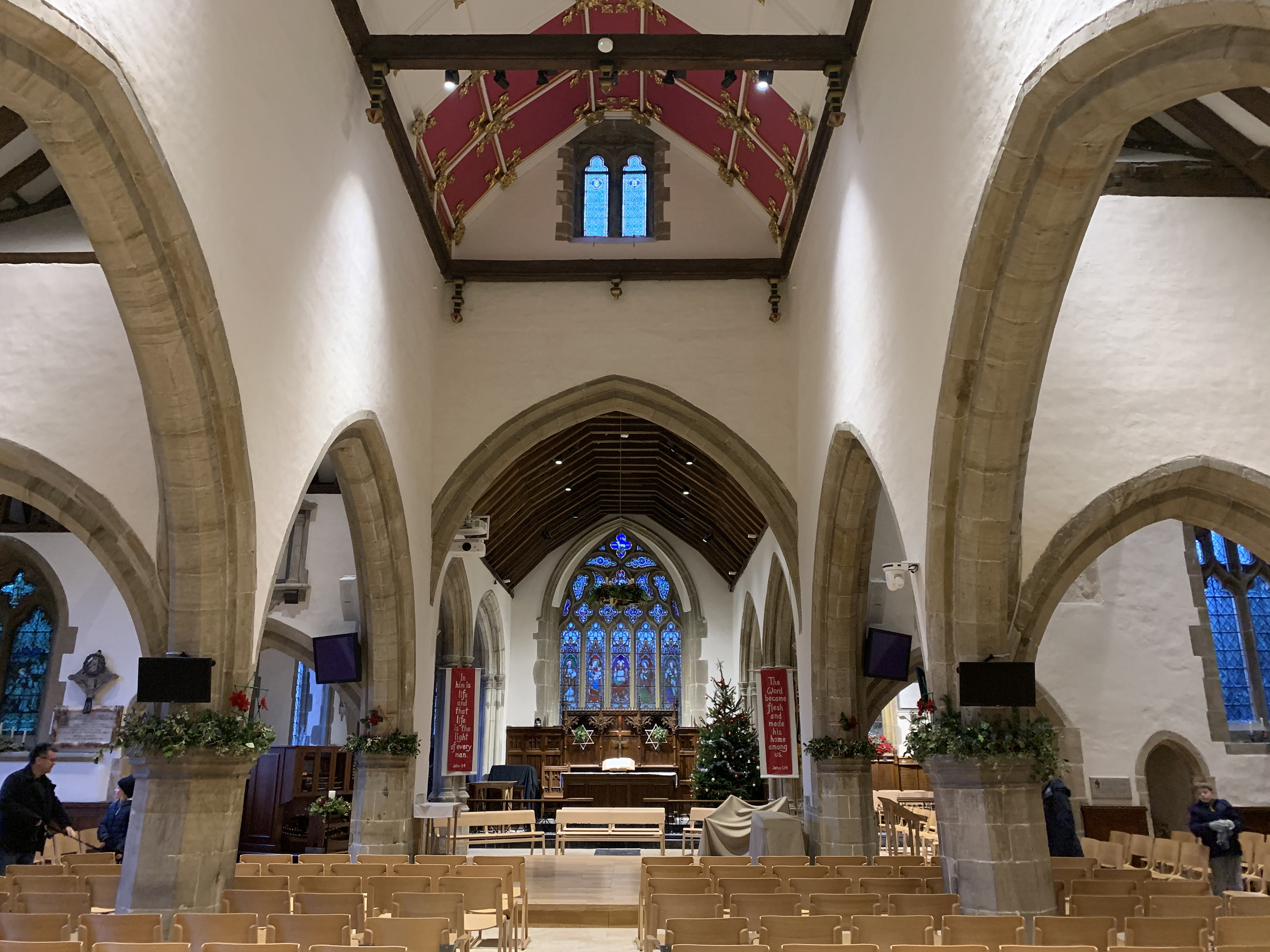
- Interior of All Saints Church, Lindfield
- All Saints Church, Lindfield
- 51°00′58″N 0°04′42″W
- Location: High Street, Lindfield, West Sussex
- Country: England
- Denomination: Church of England

Architecture
- Heritage designation: Grade II* listed
- Style: Early English
- Years built: Fourteenth century

Administration
- Parish: Lindfield, West Sussex

Clergy
- Vicar: Rev Dr Stephen Nichols

All Saints Church, Lindfield is a Grade II* listed Church of England church in Lindfield, West Sussex, England, built in the Middle Ages in the Early English style. The church is built of Sussex and Ardingly sandstone and dates mainly from the early 14th century. In the late 16th and early 17th centuries the church fell into decline and became almost derelict. It was fully restored in the mid-19th century, largely thanks to the efforts of the curate Reverend Francis Hill Sewell, a Cambridge graduate who remained the incumbent at Lindfield until his death in 1862.

== History ==
=== Anglo-Saxon origins ===
The church is associated with the earliest beginnings of the village of Lindfield, West Sussex. Lindfield first appeared as Lindefeldia, "open land with lime trees", in a Saxon charter of 765 AD, in which King Ealdwulf granted lands for the building of a minster church, which may be on the same site as the present church.

=== 12th century ===
In 1150 Archbishop Theobald confirmed the grant of the Manor of Lindfield and its land to the College of Canons at South Malling, near Lewes, whose dean – as the archbishop's representative – became the rector of the church. The post required him to be resident in Lindfield for at least three months of the year, and to direct necessary repairs to the church.

=== 14th century ===
The present church dates mainly from the early 14th century. It was built of Sussex and Ardingly sandstone ashlar with a Horsham stone slab roof. The tower has a shingled spire with an iron weather vane. The church consists of a nave of two bays with two bay lower chancels. The West Tower also dates from the 14th century and was built in three stages with a trefoiled window to the west on the bottom stage, a lancet window to the middle stage and an oculus window to the top stage. The chancel was built with north and south chapels with typical Late Perpendicular thin piers.

=== 17th century ===
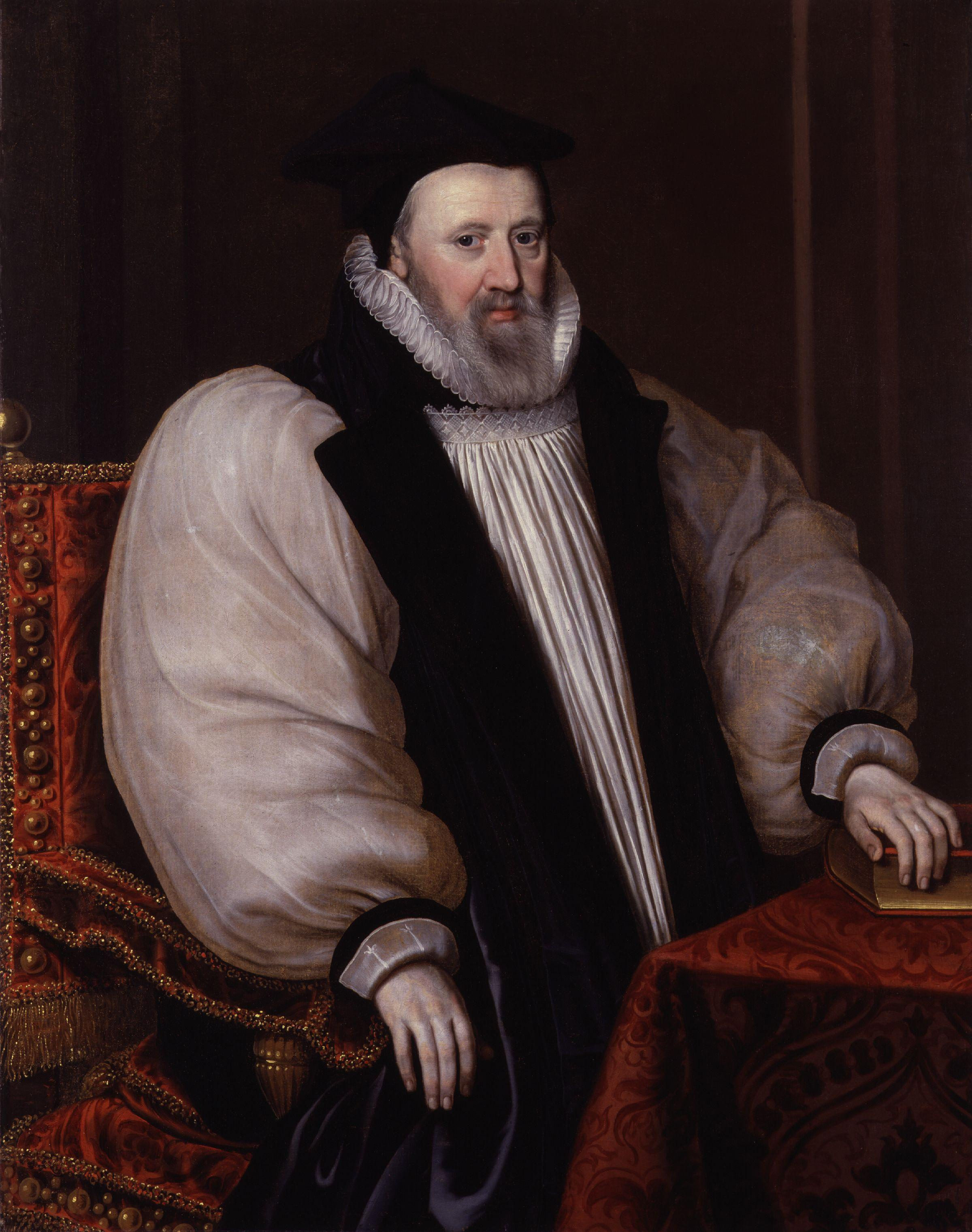
Archbishop George Abbot (1562 – 1633) granted a license to rebuild the church

In the late 16th and early 17th centuries the church fell into decline and became almost derelict. In July 1617 Archbishop George Abbot granted a licence to the churchwardens "to build the said church then in ruins without battlements". The state of the church continued to be a burden on the parish, whose membership numbered only 290 "conformist" and 10 "non-conformist" ratepayers. One Thomas Pelling was fined £5.16.3d for "refusing to pay his taxation for the repayring of the decayed church of Lindfeild".

=== 18th century ===
During the 18th and 19th centuries the state of the church continued to be a problem, and both church and parish were in such a state of neglect that it was said that "no part of England was more desolate". In 1758 records from Lambeth Palace show that the then curate stated that he was allowed just £20 per year and that this was inadequate, and he appealed to the Archbishop for an increase – which was rejected. This led to the absence of any officiating priest, and services were no longer held.

=== 19th century ===
In the mid-19th century the income from rectoral tithes remained low at just £35 per annum. This sorry state of affairs changed in 1841 with the arrival of the Reverend Francis Hill Sewell as curate, a Cambridge graduate who remained the incumbent at Lindfield until his death in 1862.

In 1847 the view of the influential Cambridge Camden Society, whose purpose was to return church architecture to the splendour of the Middle Ages, was:

The whole [church] was in a most wretched condition and the only wonder is that in the miserably peculiar circumstances of the parish any restoration should be attempted at all. All that is at present done, which is merely a restoration of the greater part of the windows, is done well; the horrible arrangement of the church is at present not touched.

Sewell himself contributed more than £650 of his own money towards the estimated £2,000 total needed. The church was fully restored in the mid-19th century.

=== 20th Century ===
On 10 September 1951 the church was declared a Grade II* listed building.

== Today ==
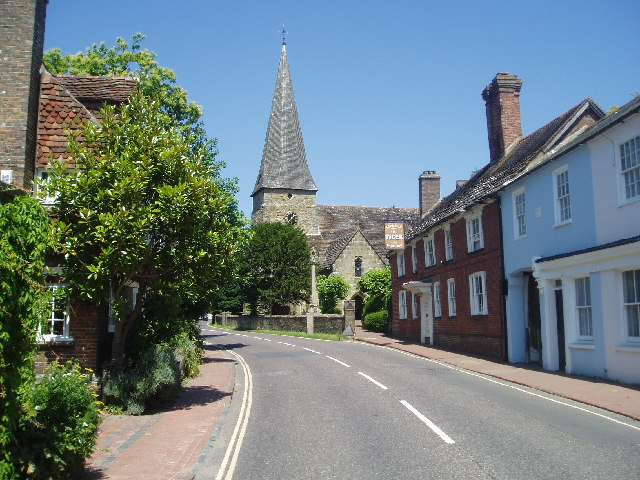
All Saints Church viewed from Lindfield High St

Today the church still retains many of its historic features. A number of tombs, for example, survive from the 18th Century. The North chapel boasts a marble wall plaque to John Court Esq who died 1794, and an obelisk with oval medallions. The south chapel has a wall plaque dedicated to Sarah Board, who died 1765, and boasts a draped urn and coat of arms.

In 2013 the "Aspire" project was launched to "repair, re-order and re-vitalise" the church. Much of the work was completed in 2018, which included removing the Victorian pews and replacing the flagstones with a modern stone floor equipped with under floor heating.

Today the church continues to serve the spiritual needs of Lindfield parish, led by Reverend Steve Nichols.

== Gallery ==
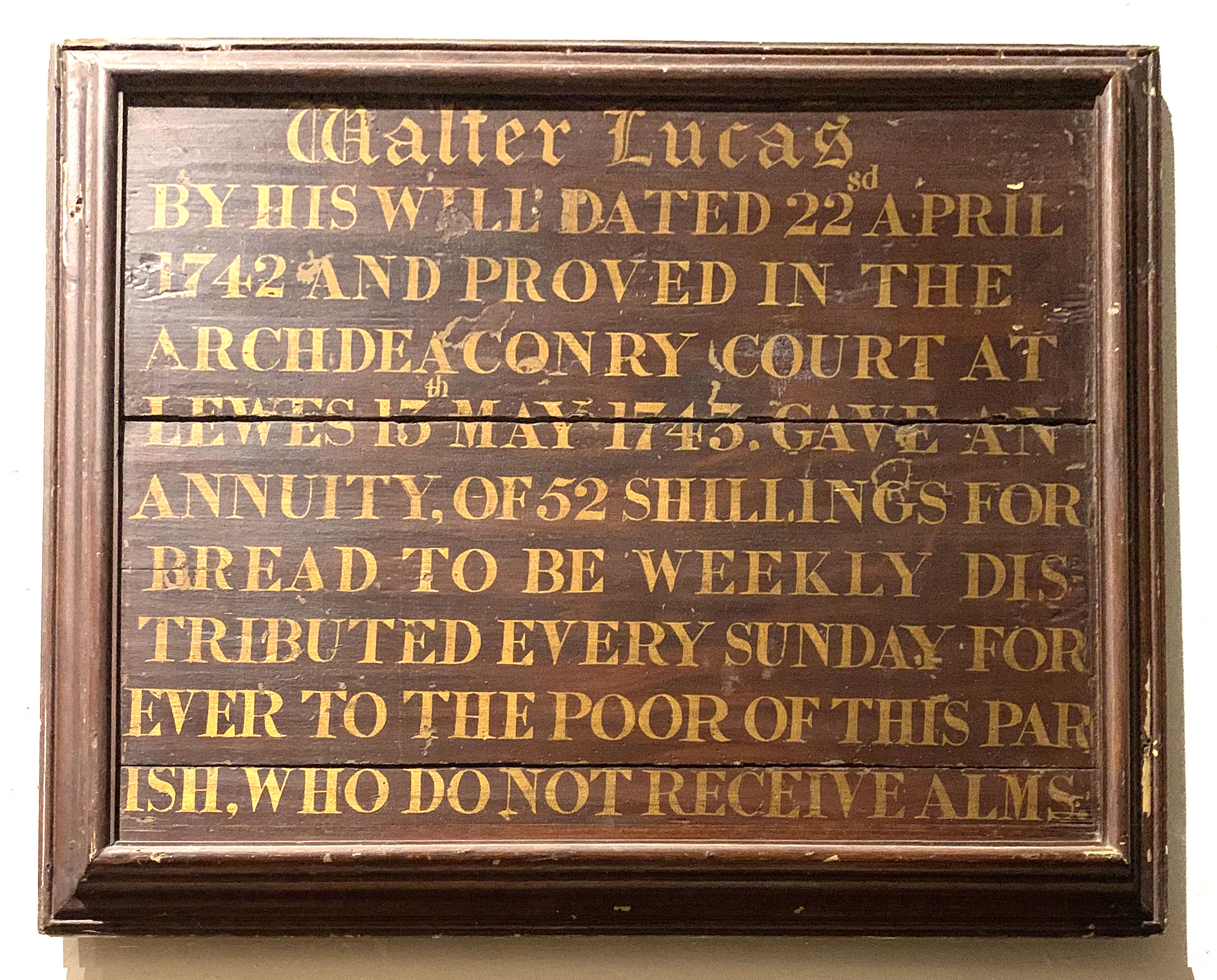
Walter Lucas Plaque in All Saints Church, Lindfield

== See also ==
- Grade II* listed buildings in West Sussex
- List of places of worship in Mid Sussex
