= Lindfield, New South Wales =

Lindfield
- Suburb
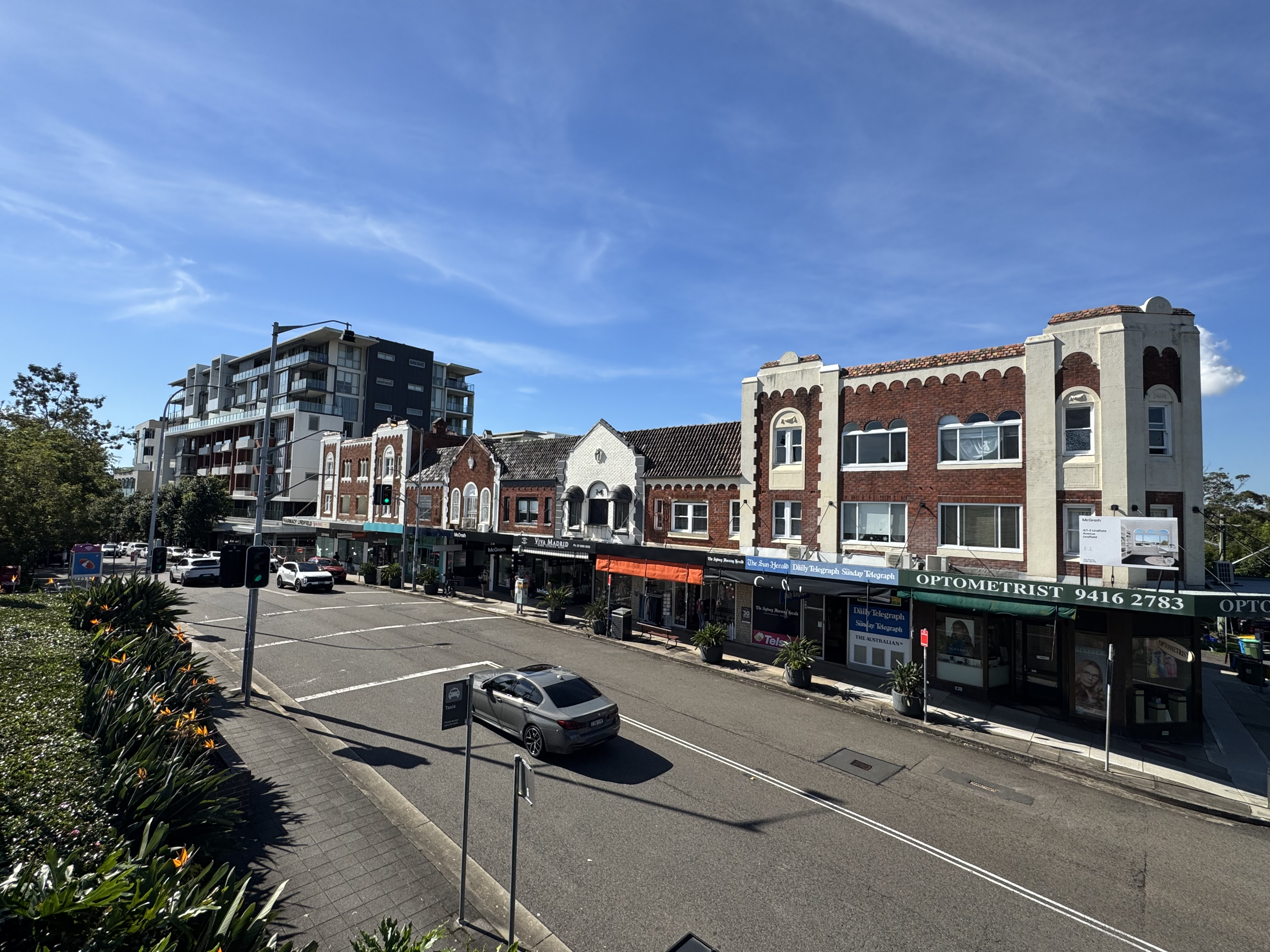
- Lindfield Avenue

- Interactive map of Lindfield
- Country: Australia
- State: New South Wales
- City: Sydney
- LGA: Ku-ring-gai Council
- Location: 13 km (8.1 mi) north-west of Sydney CBD
- Established: 1815

Government
  - State electorate: Davidson
  - Federal division: Bradfield

Area
  - Total: 5.17 km^{2} (2.00 sq mi)
- Elevation: 106 m (348 ft)

Population
  - Total: 10,943 (SAL 2021)
- Postcode: 2070
Suburbs around Lindfield
Killara	Killara	East Killara
Macquarie Park	Lindfield	East Lindfield
North Ryde	Roseville	Roseville Chase

Lindfield is a suburb on the Upper North Shore of Sydney in the state of New South Wales, Australia. It is 13 kilometres north-west of the Sydney Central Business District and is in the local government area of Ku-ring-gai Council. East Lindfield is a separate suburb to the east, sharing the postcode of 2070.

This suburb of 5.17 square kilometres contains residential housing of California bungalow and federation style, in double brick and tile construction. Australian native bushland in Garigal National Park and Lane Cove National Park borders the suburb.

== History ==
Lindfield was originally the home of the Kuringgai indigenous people.

Europeans first became active in the area in around 1810, when the colonial government set up a timber gathering camp staffed by convicts. By the 1840s, fruit growing and farming became the suburb's primary industries. Settlement began to increase in the latter half of the nineteenth century. The Lindfield railway station opened in 1890, and Lindfield Post Office opened on 5 January 1895. Land values increased in the area around the railway and more professionals moved into the area.

The name "Lindfield" means a clearing in the lime forest, and derives from the name given by an early landowner, Francis List, to a cottage he built in the area in 1884. List likely named his cottage after Lindfield, Sussex, England. When a railway line came through the area in 1890s, the name of the property was used to identify the station and neighbourhood.

During the years after World War II the suburb experienced significant growth.

== Heritage listings ==
Lindfield has a number of heritage-listed sites, including:

- 33 Tryon Road: Tryon Road Uniting Church

== Infrastructure and development ==
Ku-ring-gai municipality

Lindfield railway station is on the North Shore railway line of the Sydney Trains network and is about 30 minutes by train from the Sydney central business district, plus the suburb is 20 minutes by road from Hornsby. The Pacific Highway is the main arterial road (for north–south access) through Lindfield. Lindfield has a small commercial area on both sides of Lindfield railway station on the Pacific Highway and Lindfield Avenue. The former Commonwealth Bank is an art deco style building on the Pacific Highway.

Lindfield Library is a branch of the Ku-ring-gai Municipal Library Network. There are two community halls: East Lindfield Community Hall at Crana Avenue and West Lindfield Community Hall at Moore Avenue. There are two tennis courts at Lindfield Community Centre (behind the library) and a further two courts at Lindfield Park in Tryon Road.

=== Places of worship ===
Lindfield has five places of worship: St Albans Anglican Church, Holy Family Catholic Church, Lindfield Uniting Church (with church buildings on Tryon Road and the Pacific Highway) and the North Shore Synagogue.

=== Schools ===
Schools in the suburb comprise: Lindfield Public School, Lindfield East Public School, Newington College Preparatory School, Holy Family Catholic Primary School, and Masada College (K-6). Killara High School is also close by, in Killara.

The University of Technology Sydney, Kuring-gai Campus, (formerly The William Balmain Teachers College and then The Kuring-gai College of Advanced Education,) operated at a campus on Eton Road from 1971 to 2015. It offered courses in business, nursing and midwifery, education and travel. The site was then closed in 2015 while an extensive interior fitout was undertaken. It was reopened ahead of the 2019 school year as The Lindfield Learning Village, an unconventional K-12 public school.

=== Commercial ===
Commercial developments in Lindfield are situated along the Pacific Highway, Lindfield Shopping Village and nearby Tryon Road.

Lindfield Arcade was demolished in 2016 in order to facilitate the construction of residential apartments.

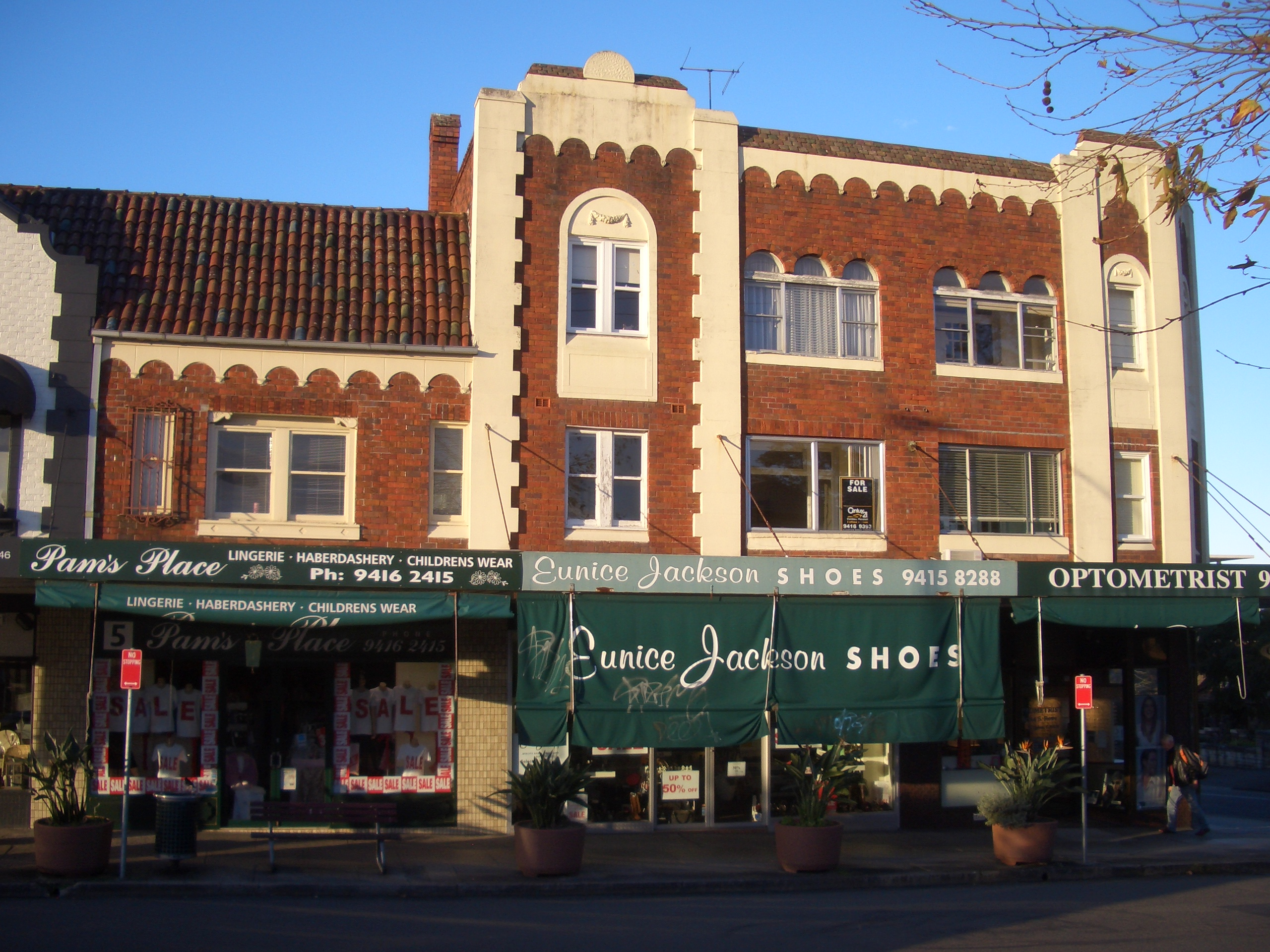
Lindfield Avenue shops

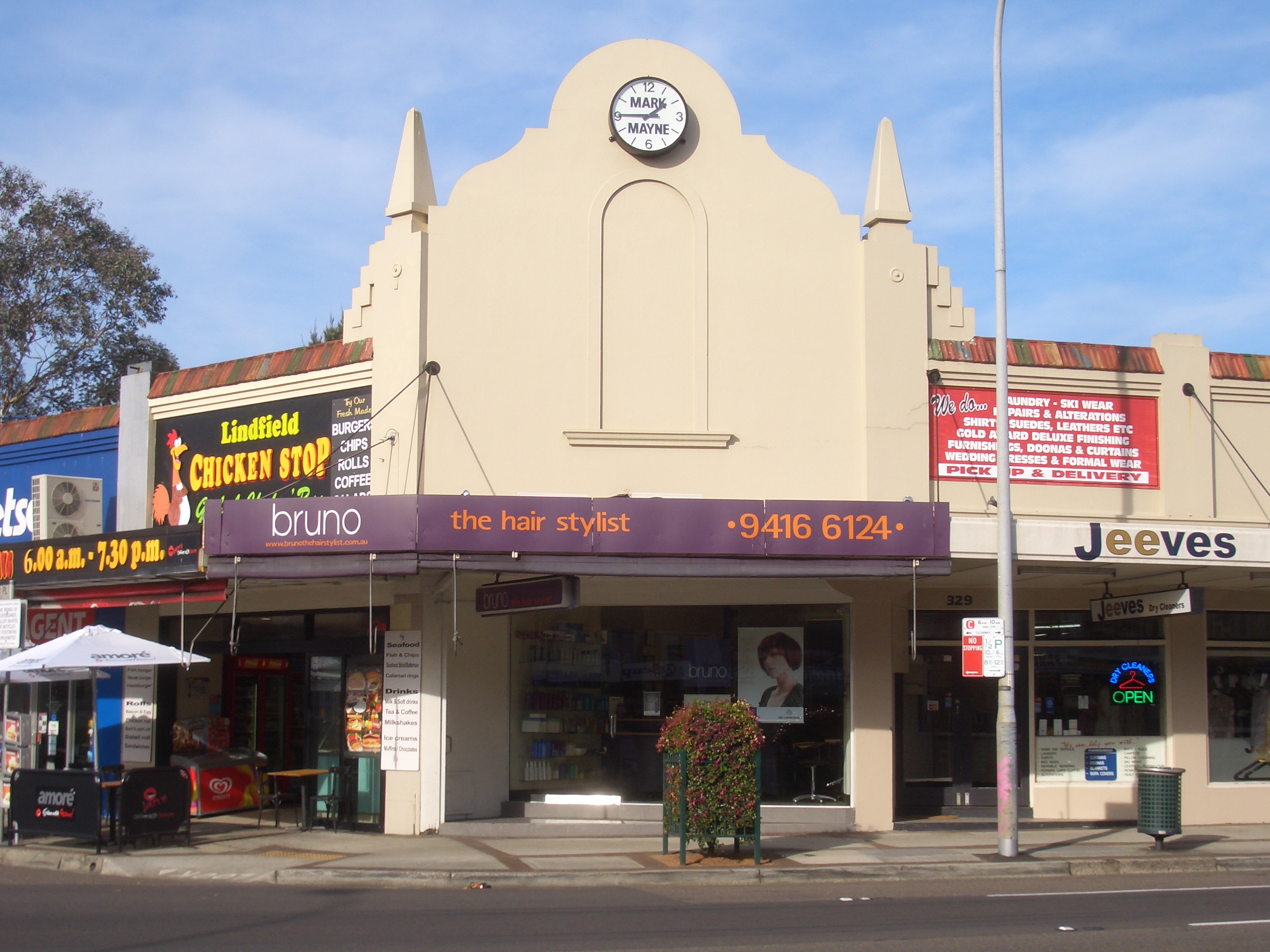
Pacific Highway shops

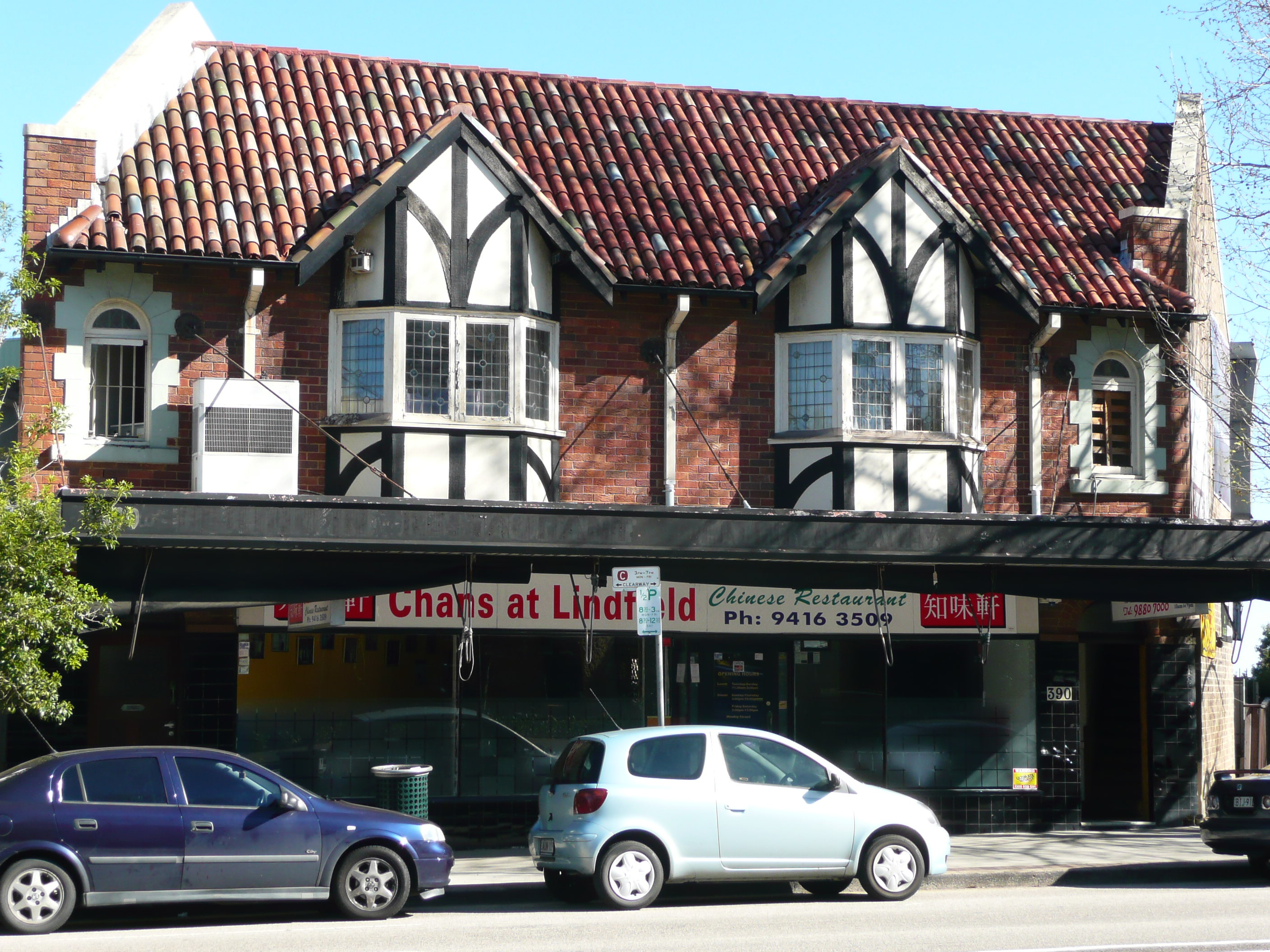
Pacific Highway Tudor revival building

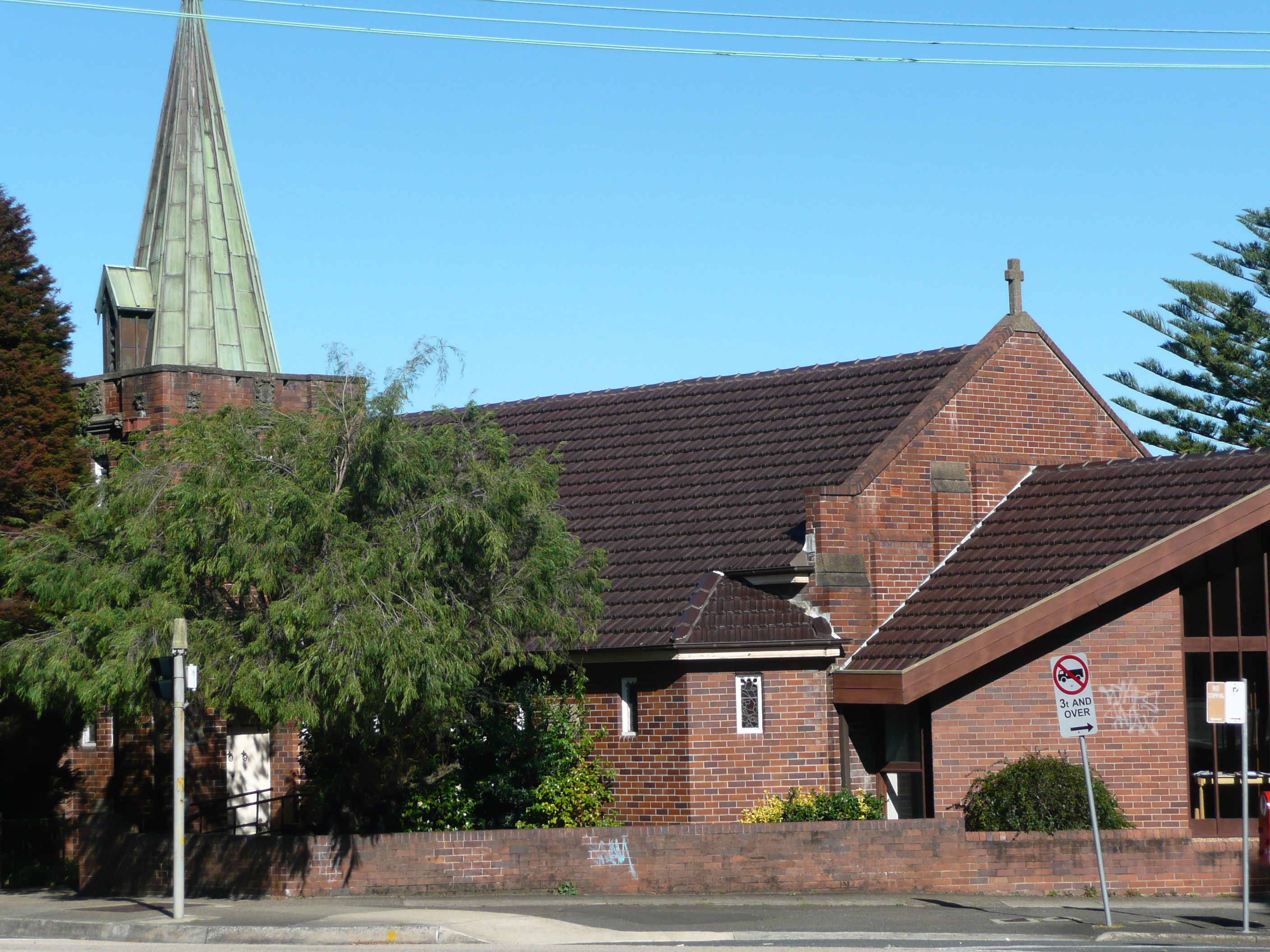
Lindfield Uniting Church

=== Residential ===
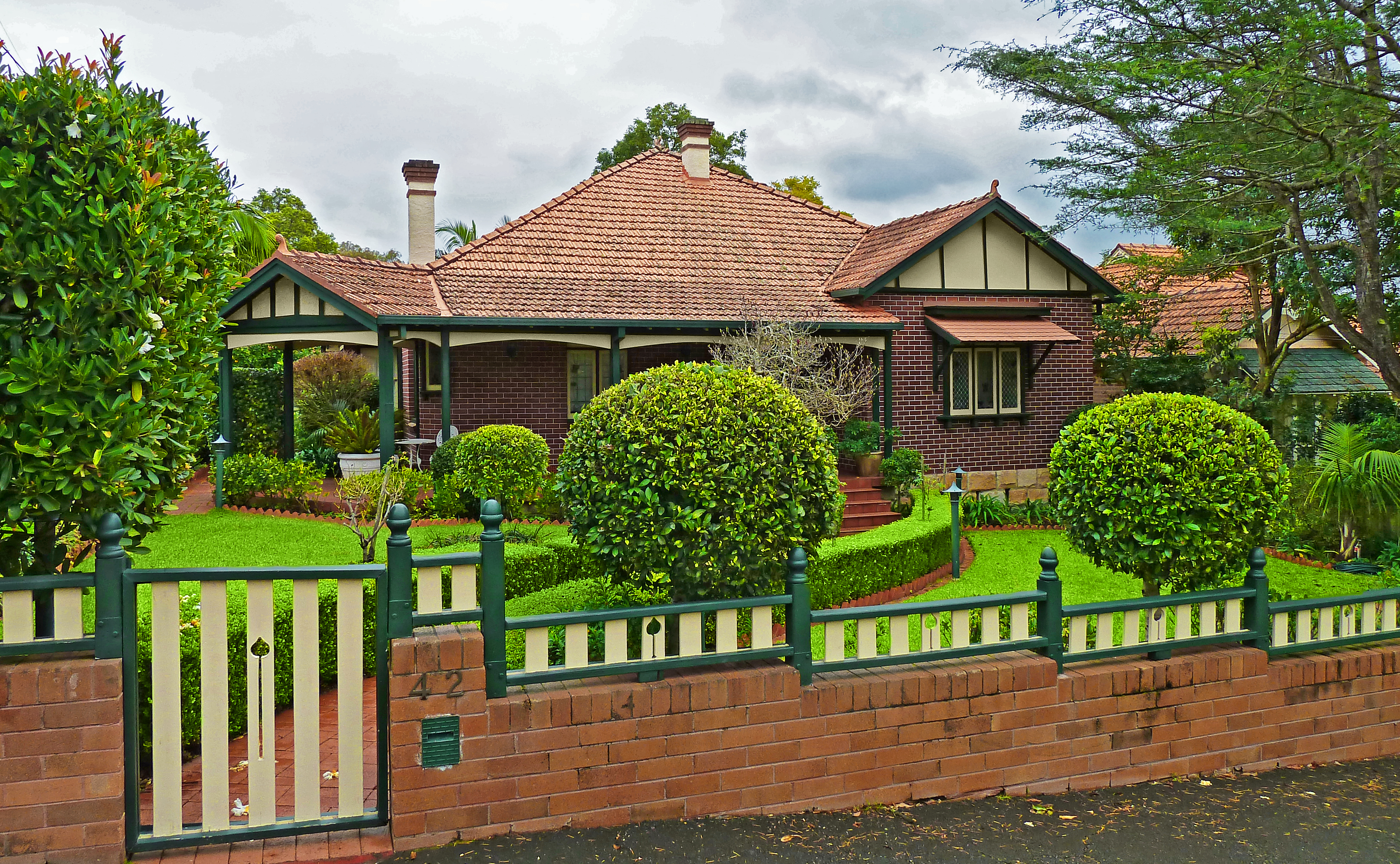
Federation House, Trafalgar Avenue

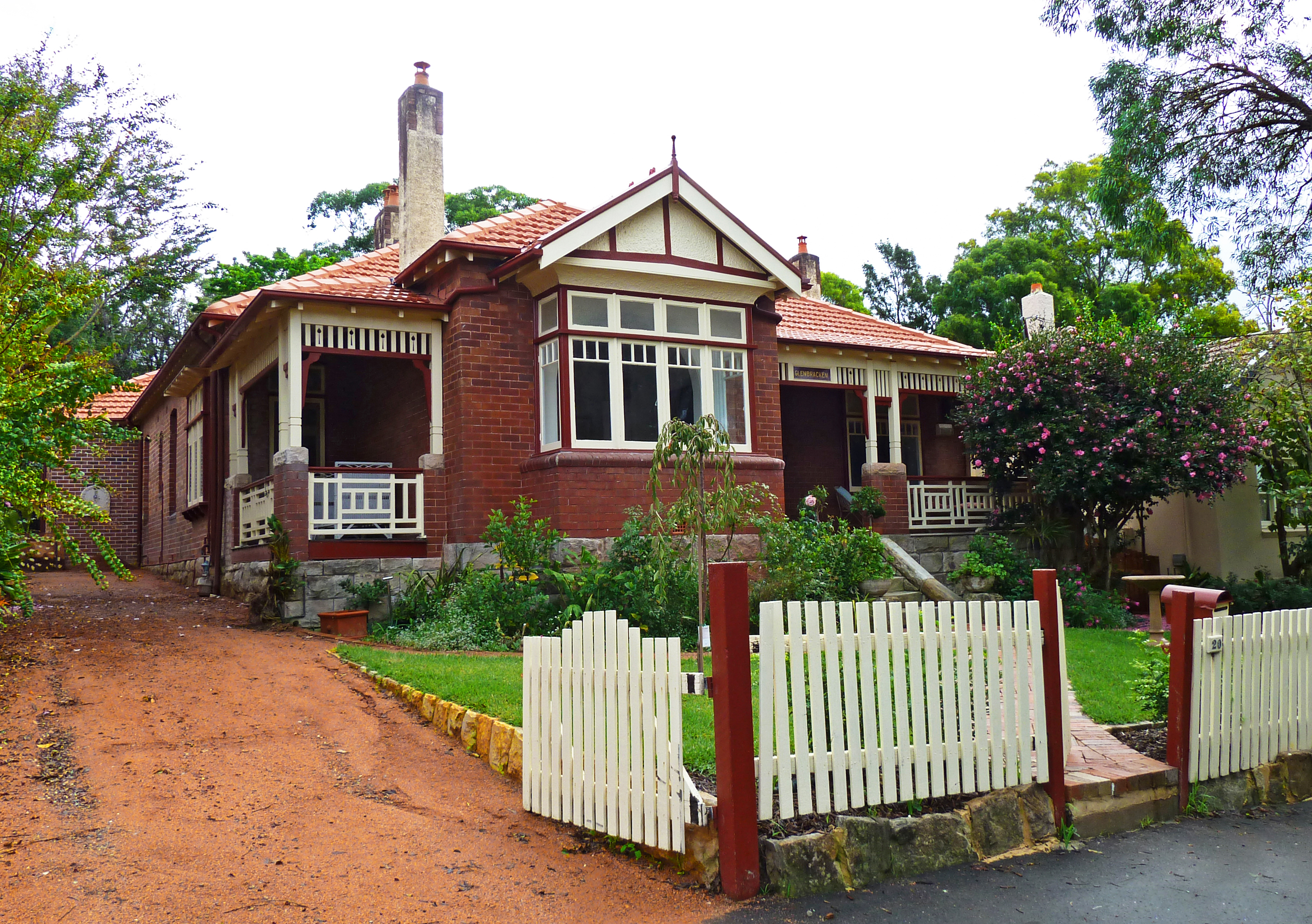
Federation house, Strickland Avenue

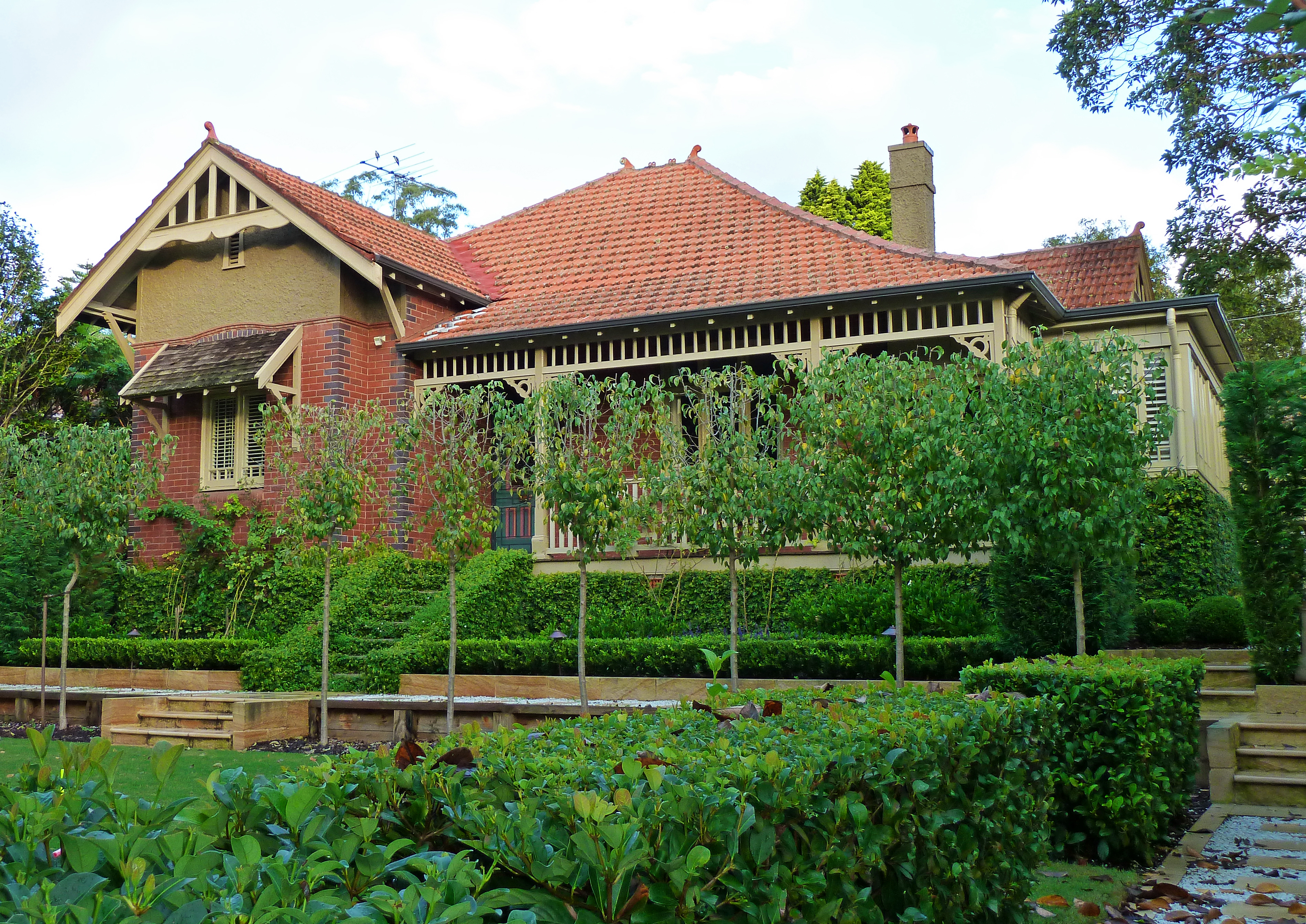
Federation house, Middle Harbour Road

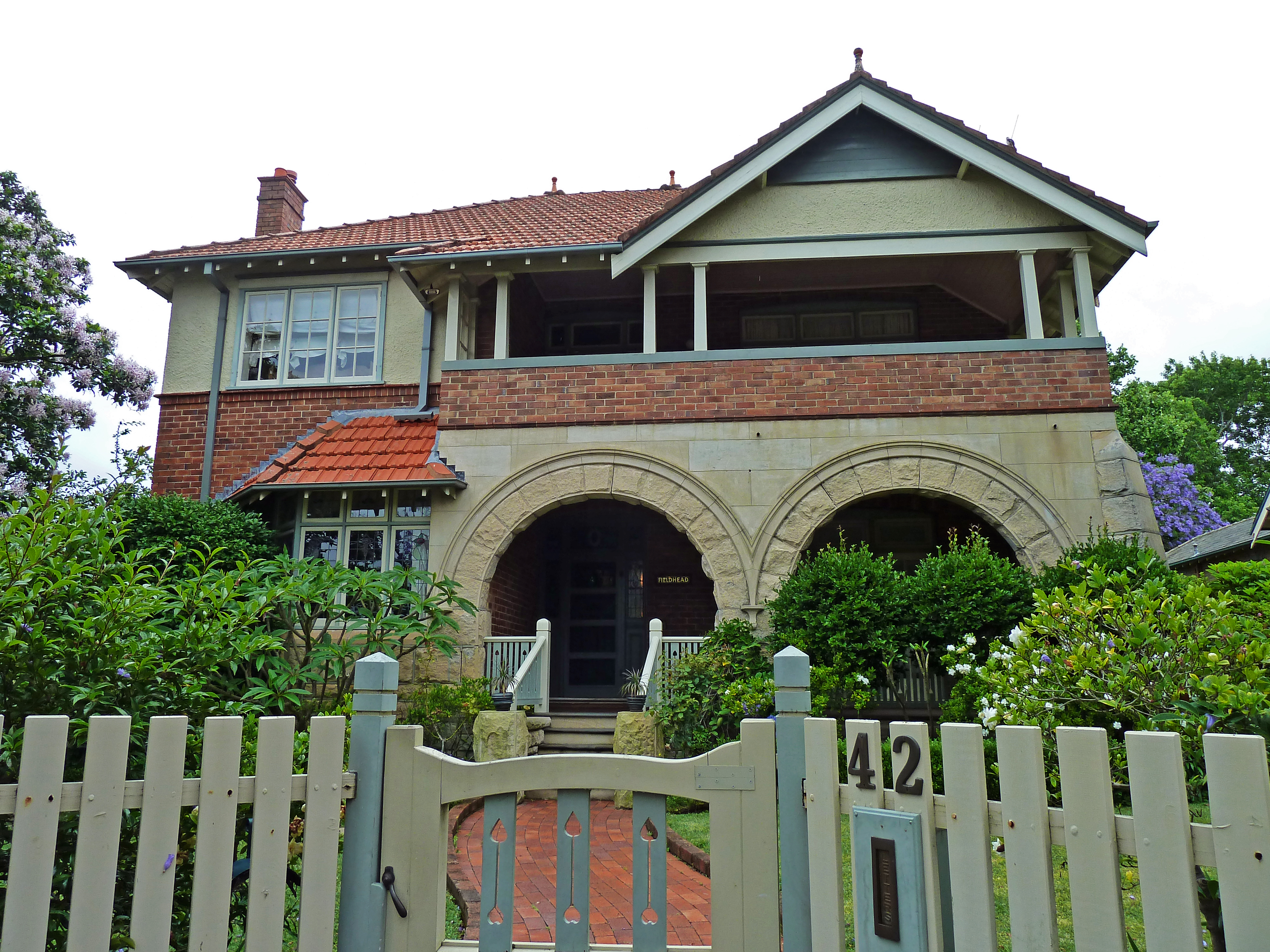
Federation house, Nelson Road

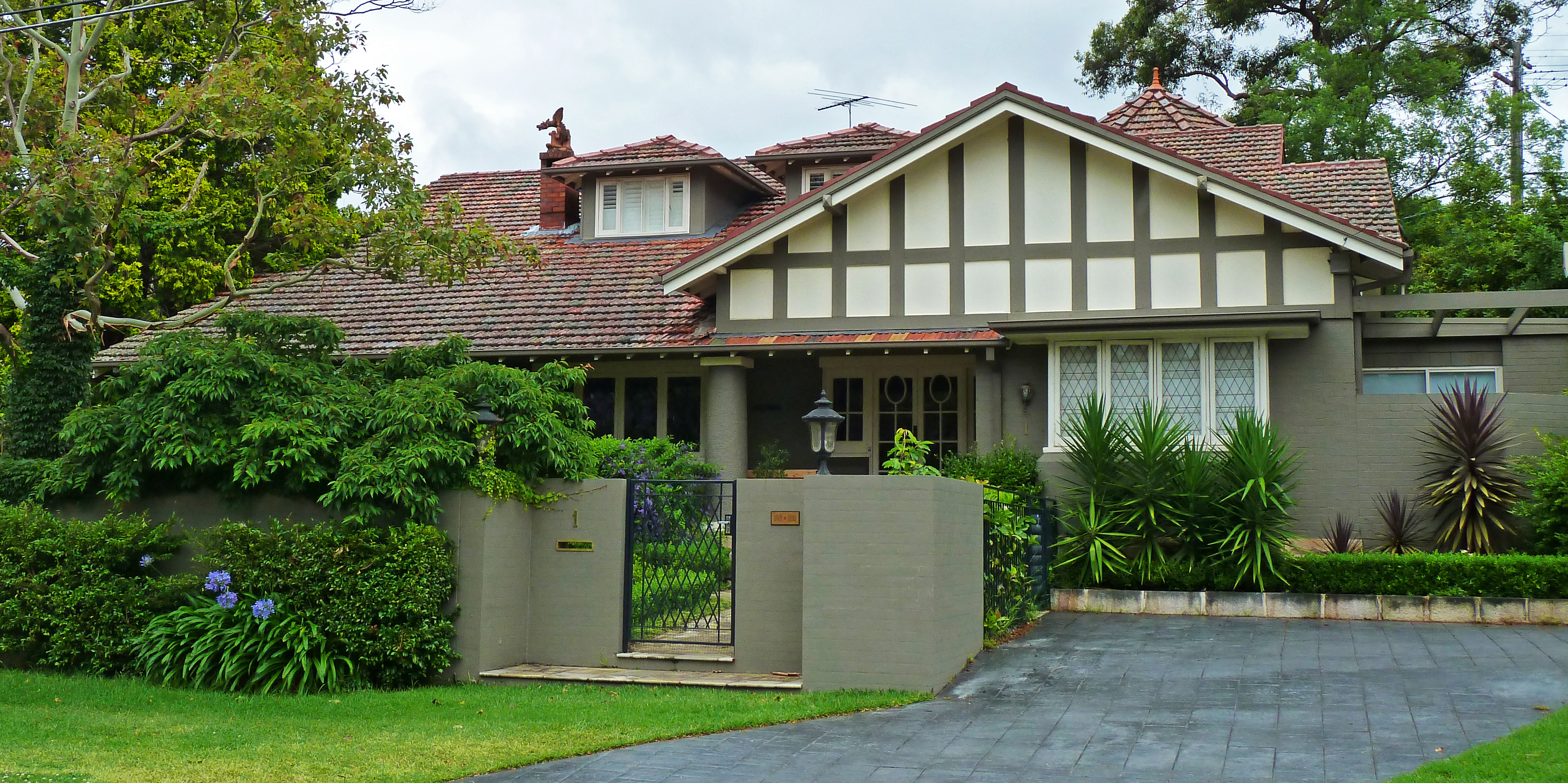
California bungalow house, Northcote Road

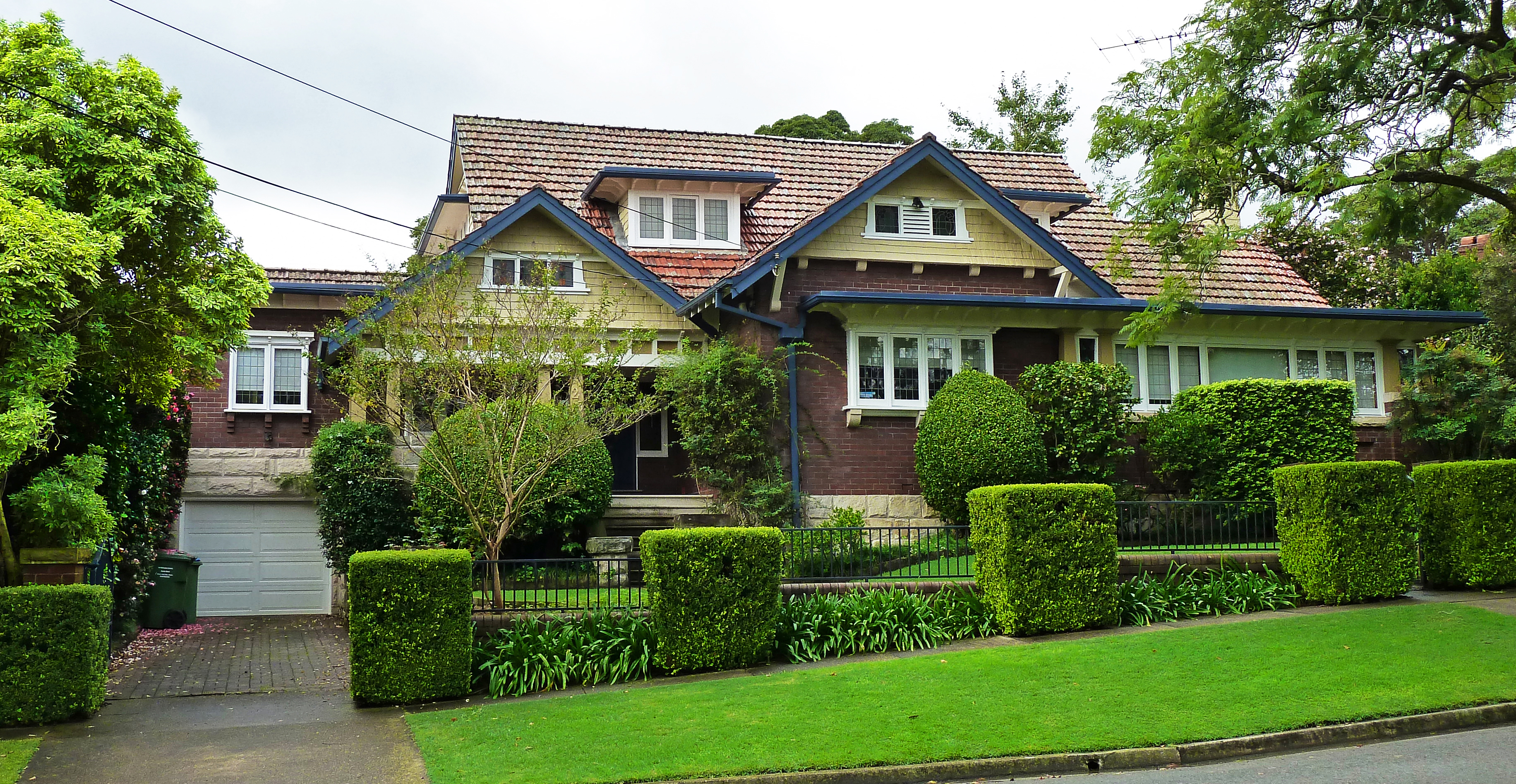
Arts & Crafts Bungalow house, Waimea Road

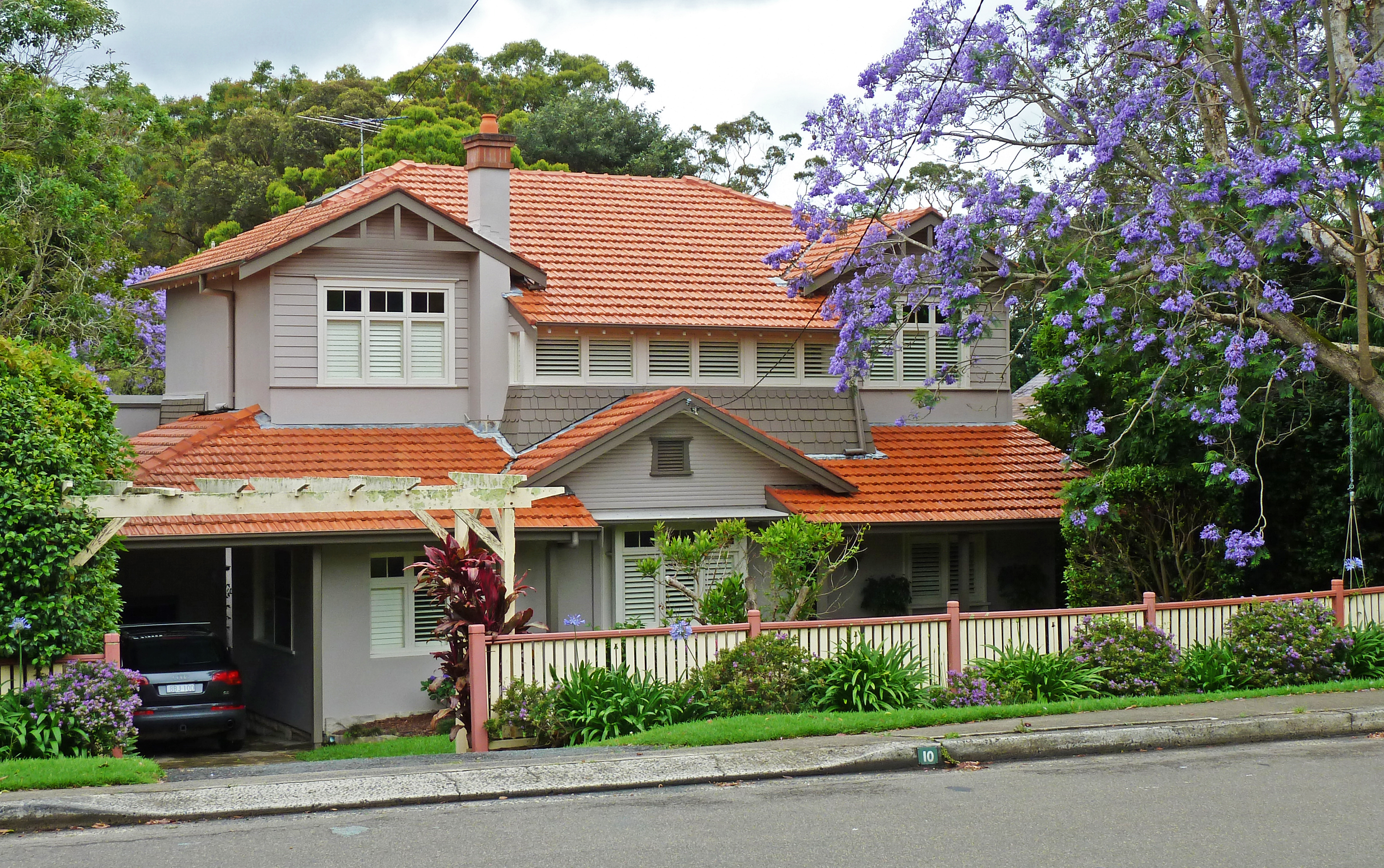
Arts & Crafts Bungalow House, Northcote Road

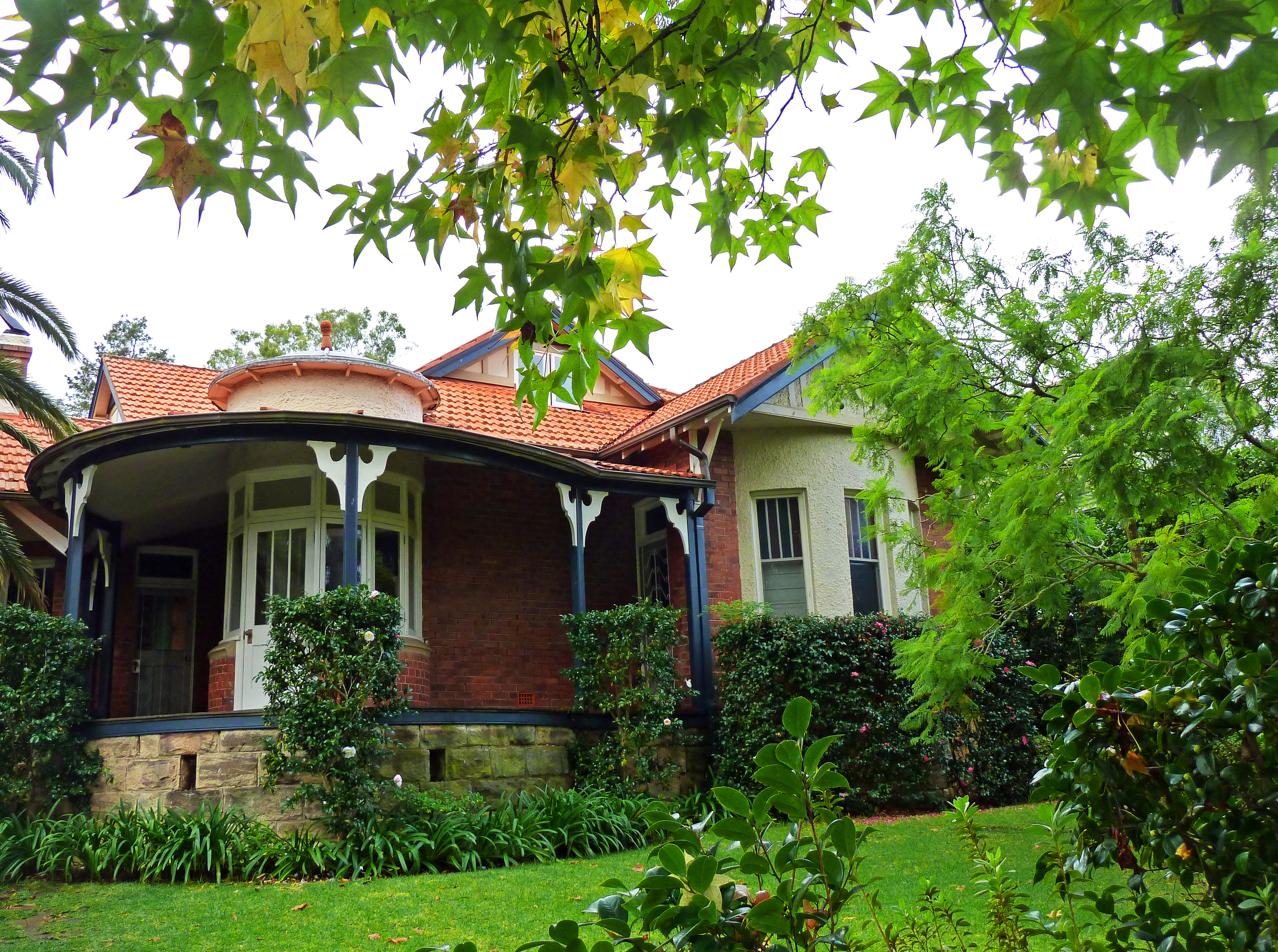
Federation home, Waimea Road

== Residents ==
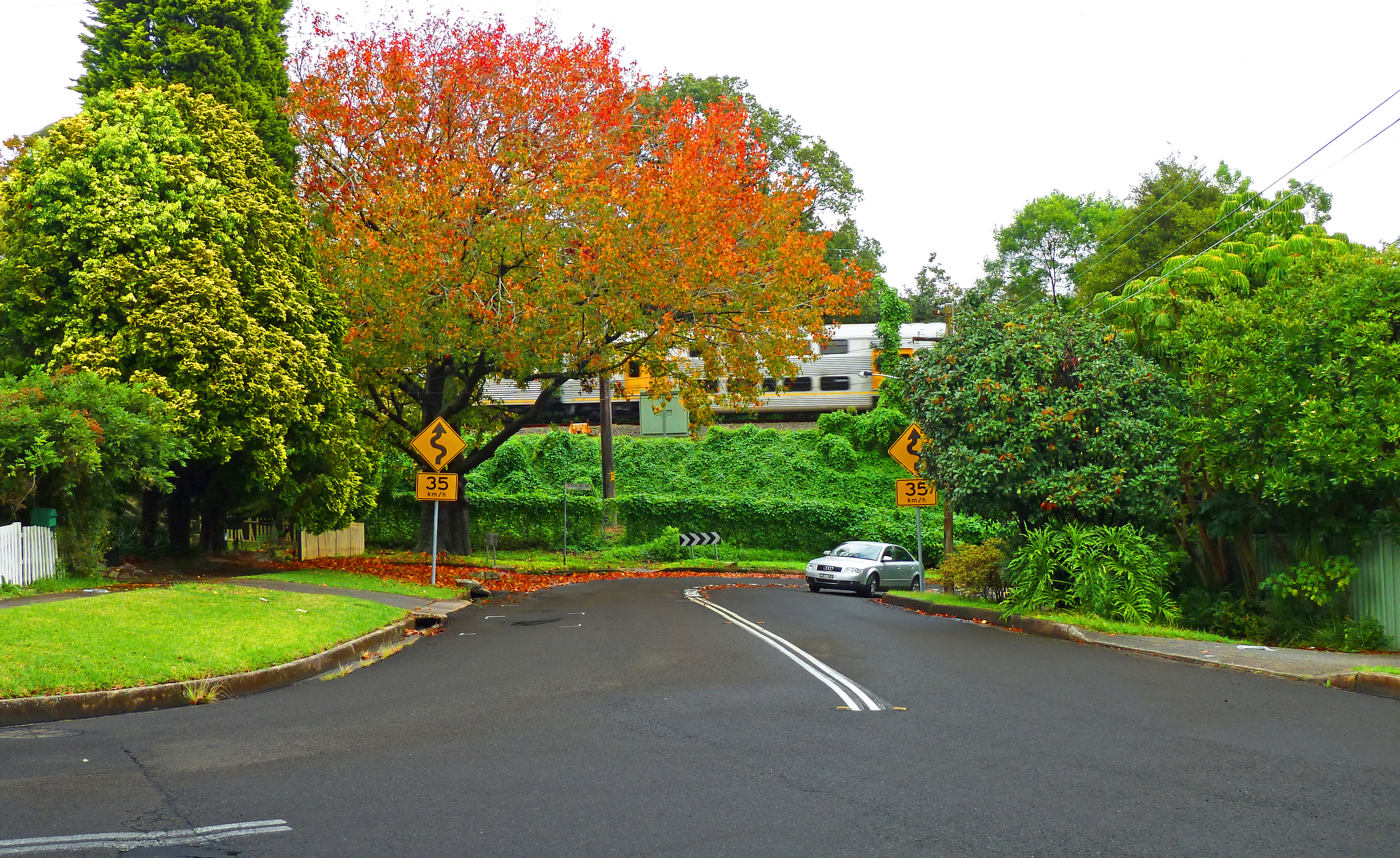
Strickland Avenue

=== Demographics ===
At the 2021 census, Lindfield recorded a population of 10,943. Of these:

Age distribution
Lindfield residents' median age was 40 years, higher than the national median of 38. Children aged under 15 years made up 20.0% of the population (national average is 18.2%) and people aged 65 years and over made up 17.1% of the population (national average is 17.2%).
Ethnic diversity
53.9% of people were born in Australia. The most common countries of birth were China 12.2%, Hong Kong 4.4%, England 3.9%, South Korea 2.6% and Malaysia 1.6%. 59.0% of people only spoke English at home. Other languages spoken at home included Mandarin 15.4%, Cantonese 7.9%, Korean 3.2%, Japanese 1.6% and Hindi 0.7%.
Income
The median weekly household income was $2,833, higher than the national median of $1,746.
Housing
Stand-alone houses accounted 52.1% of occupied private dwellings, while 44.3% were flats, units or apartments. The average household size was 2.8 people.
Religion
The most common responses for religion in Lindfield were No Religion 44.6%, Catholic 16.8% and Anglican 13.2%.

=== Notable residents ===
- Gordon Bray, a sports commentator
- Iva Davies, a singer from the band Flowers/Icehouse, lived in Lindfield during the 1970s to early-1980s whilst he was part of the ABC Sinfonia (orchestra) and started the band there. The song "Icehouse" was written about the house Iva lived in at 18 Tryon Road and also a dishevelled old house across the street, which Davies later learned was a half-way house for psychiatric and drug rehab patients.
- Nick Farr-Jones, captain of the Wallabies (Australian rugby union team)
- Peter Garrett, former Midnight Oil singer and later Australian Labor Party (ALP) politician, lived in Lindfield during his teenage years.
- Billy Hughes, 7th Prime Minister of Australia, lived in Nelson Rd, Lindfield, from 1924 until his death in 1952
- Stirling Mortlock, captain of the Wallabies (Australian rugby union team)
- Greg Rowell, Australian cricketer, born in Lindfield.
- Clive Shakespeare, a former Sherbet guitarist, operated the Silverwood recording studio in Hobart Avenue.
- Karl Stefanovic, journalist and podcaster.

== See also ==
- Seven Little Australians Park named after a book by Ethel Turner.
