= Lindfield, West Sussex =

Village and parish in West Sussex, England

Coordinates: 51.0135°N 0.0833°W

Lindfield
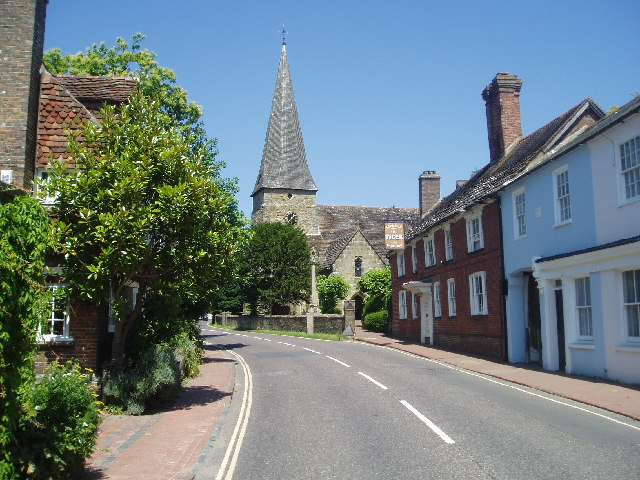
- Lindfield High Street leading to All Saints Church

- Location within West Sussex
- Area: 2.24 km^{2} (0.86 sq mi)
- Population: 5,394 2001 Census; 5,836 (2011 Census)
  - Density: 2,407/km^{2} (6,230/sq mi)
- OS grid reference: TQ345255
  - London: 34 miles (55 km) N
- Civil parish: Lindfield
- District: Mid Sussex
- Shire county: West Sussex
- Region: South East
- Country: England
- Sovereign state: United Kingdom
- Post town: HAYWARDS HEATH
- Postcode district: RH16
- Dialling code: 01444
- Police: Sussex
- Fire: West Sussex
- Ambulance: South East Coast
- UK Parliament: Mid Sussex
- Website: http://www.lindfieldparishcouncil.org.uk

Lindfield is a village and civil parish in the Mid Sussex District of West Sussex, England. The parish lies 1 mile (2 km) to the north-east of Haywards Heath, and stands on the upper reaches of the River Ouse. The name 'Lindfield' means 'open land with lime trees.'

The parish Church, All Saints, stands at the top of the High Street and its history goes back to 1098. One of the oldest houses in the village is Church House, formerly known as The Tiger, and still referred to as "The Tiger" by Lindfield residents. The two schools in Lindfield are Lindfield Primary Academy and Black Thorns. It is classified as an Area of Outstanding Natural Beauty.

== The Village ==
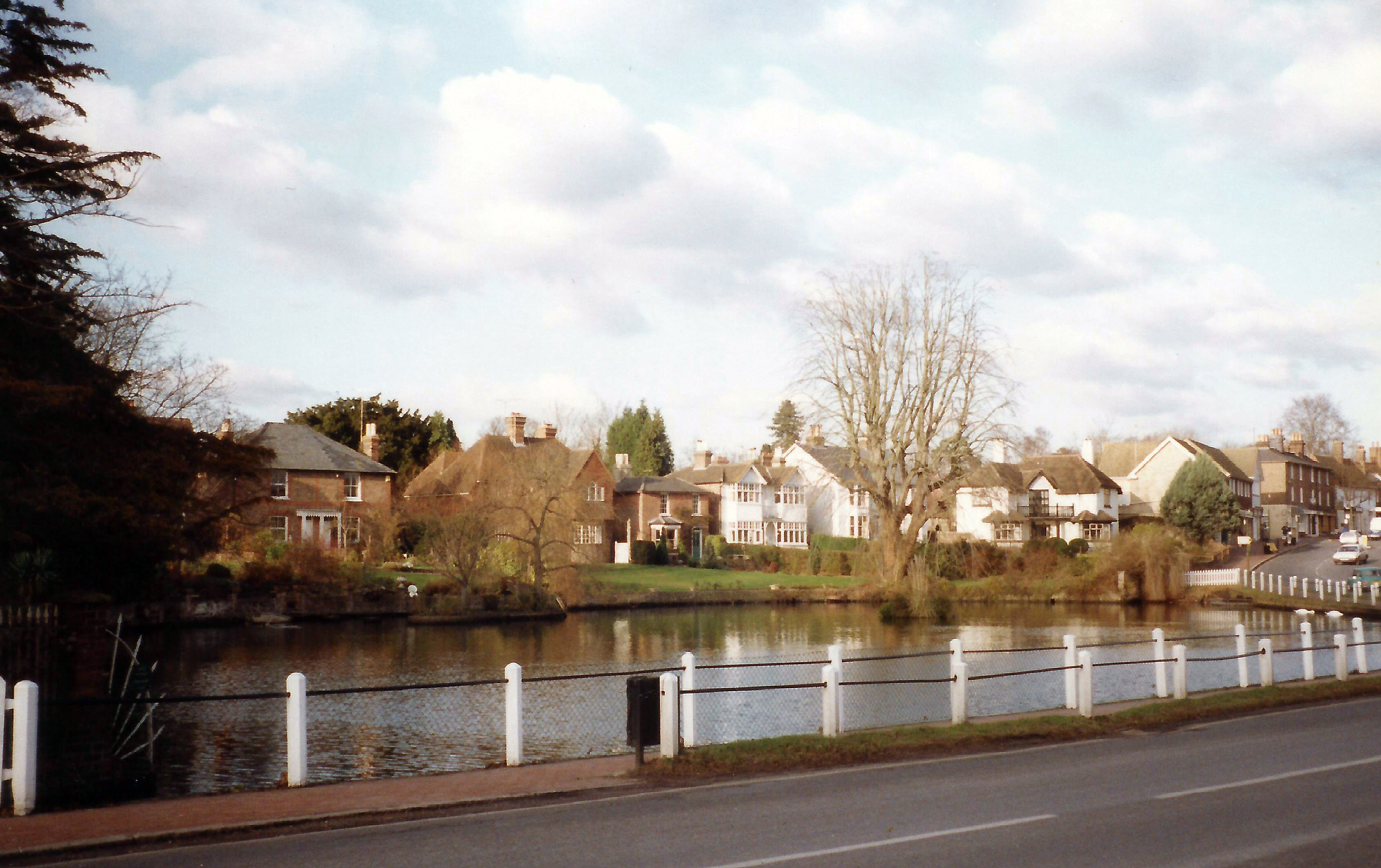
Village Pond

The village stands on high ground above the upper reaches of the River Ouse. It is situated close to both the natural beauty of the High Weald and to Haywards Heath with its amenities and station on the main London-Brighton railway line.

Lindfield has a rich historic and architectural heritage. The ancient High Street, lined with lime trees, has over forty medieval and post medieval timber-framed houses, with many individual shops. At the bottom of the High Street is a natural spring-fed pond with fish, ducks, and herons. Beyond lies the Common which, over the centuries, has witnessed many events – fairs, festivals, bonfire celebrations and sporting activities; cricket has been played there since 1747. Today, it is still central to village celebrations and leisure activities. In addition to the Common there is Pickers' Green, providing pitches for cricket, football, stoolball and a children's play area.

== Etymology ==
The place-name Lindfield is derived from the Old English linden + feld, meaning 'open land where lime-trees grow'. The name was first recorded in c.765 as Lindefeldia (see 'History' below). The name was later recorded as Lyndefeld Bardolf in 1327, Linfeld in 1590, and Lindfeild Dorchter in 1675. The Bardolf family were owners of one of the manors of Lindfield during the 13th and 14th centuries. 'Dorchter' is a corruption of 'd'arches', which was a scribal contraction of 'archiepiscopi', showing Lindfield to have once belonged to an archbishopric.

== History ==
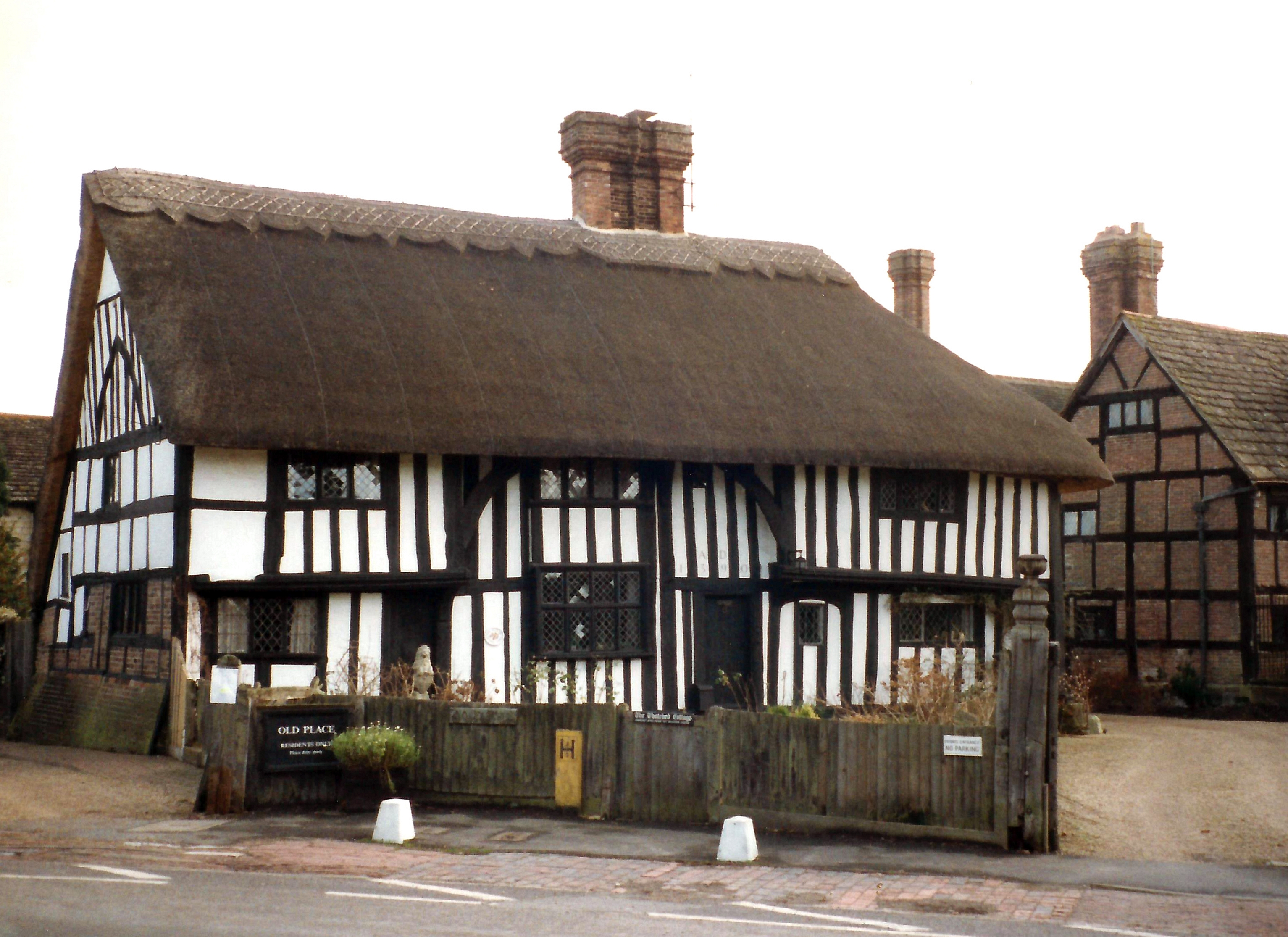
The Thatched Cottage, with the Old Place visible behind

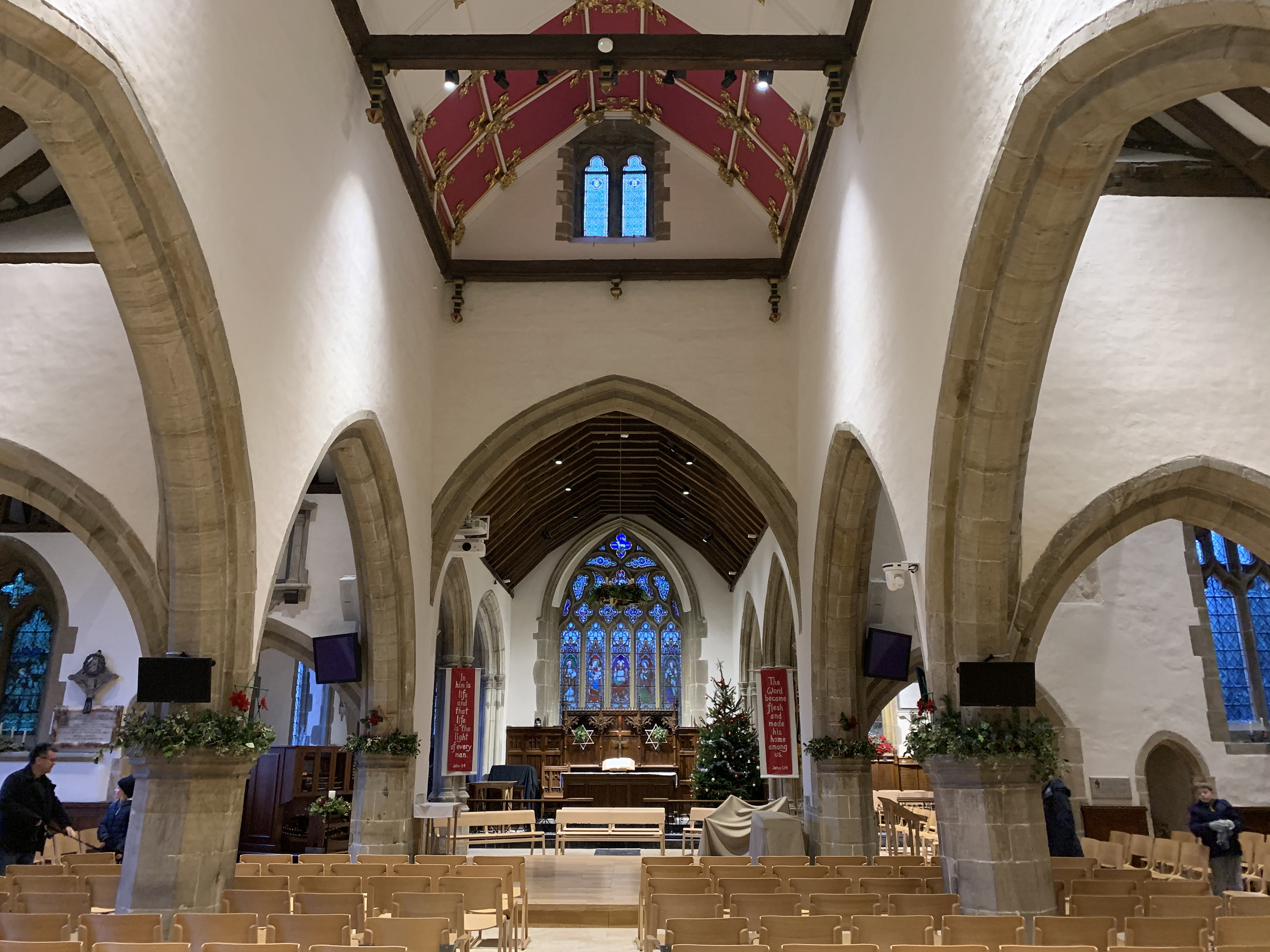
Interior of All Saints Church, Lindfield

The High Street follows an ancient north–south track that has existed for thousands of years, long before the Romans built a major road, the London to Brighton Way, a mile to the west of the village.

Lindfield first appeared as Lindefeldia, 'open land with lime trees', in a Saxon charter of 765 AD, in which King Ealdwulf granted lands for the building of a Minster church, which may be on the same site as the present All Saints Church, Lindfield.

When the Domesday Book was compiled the lands were held by the Archbishop of Canterbury.

King Edward III recognised the importance of medieval Lindfield and in 1343 granted the town a royal charter to hold a market every Thursday and two annual eight-day fairs. For centuries the fairs continued each April and August with the summer fair becoming one of the largest sheep sales in Sussex.

Lindfield was once part of the thriving Wealden iron industry. As early as 1539, William Levett of Buxted, a county curate with a thriving sideline in iron and armaments, was recorded as extracting iron ore at Lindfield. Later the Henslowe family of Lindfield were actively engaged in the iron milling business in association with Ralph Hogge, parson Levett's former servant and later a major ironmaster in his own right.

In 1841 the London-Brighton railway opened, passing to the west of the parish with a 'Station for Cuckfield and Lindfield Towns' on open land that was to become the town of Haywards Heath. The construction of the Ouse Valley branch line reached Lindfield in 1866 with a proposed station to the north of All Saints' Church but the line was abandoned for financial reasons.

Lindfield, a suburb of the Australian city of Sydney, is likely named after the village by landowner Francis List after his cottage in the area.

Charles Eamer Kempe, a leading church stained glass designer and manufacturer lived at Lindfield until his death in 1907. Kempe renovated and redecorated an Elizabethan manor house near the village which he renamed Old Place, from where he entertained clients and professional partners. Internally the house was appointed to the highest standard of Victorian splendour. After his death in the 1930s, the house was partitioned into six individual residences, with the main reception rooms forming part of the new "East Wing".

== Nature and the countryside ==
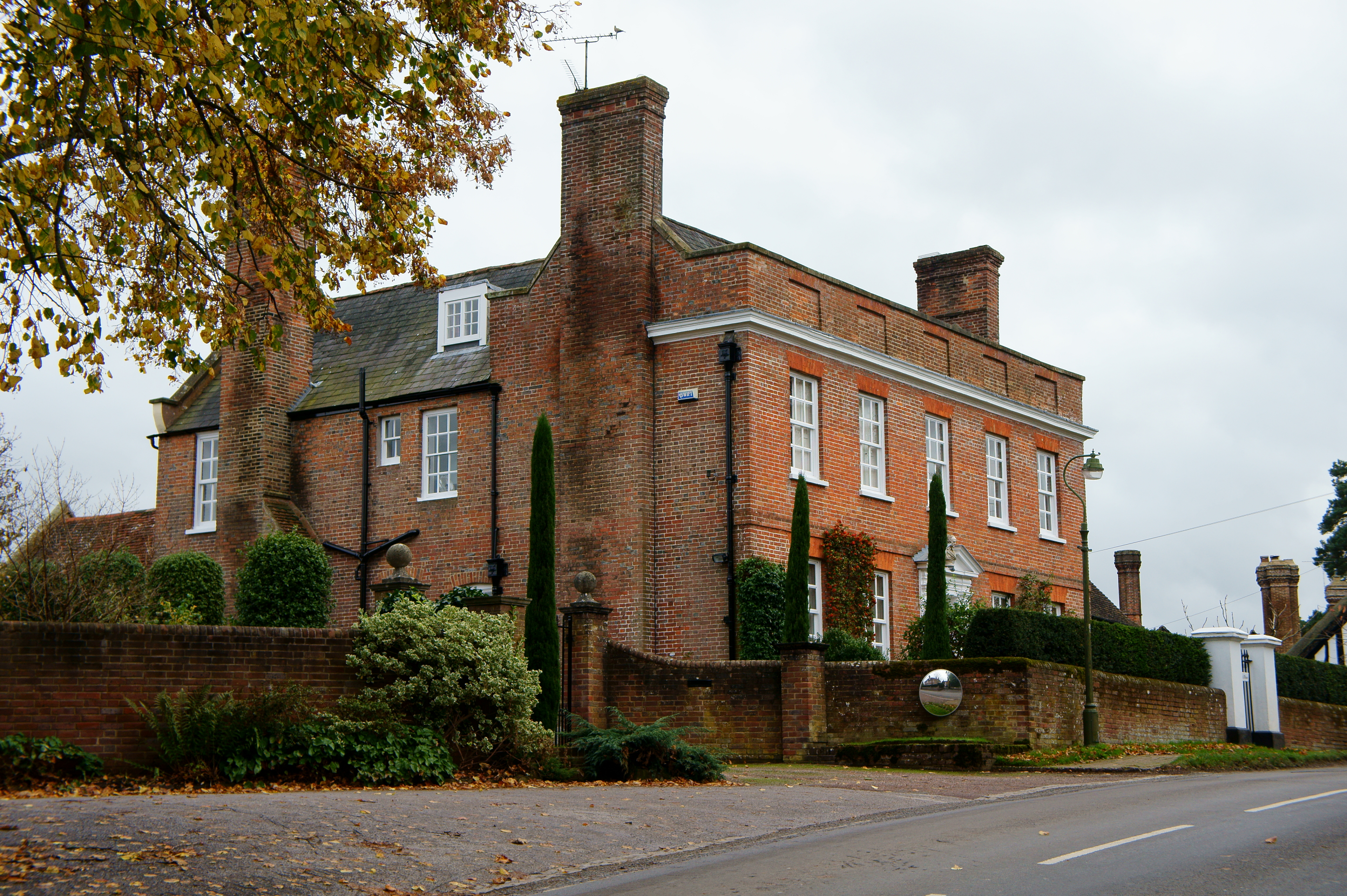
Lindfield House

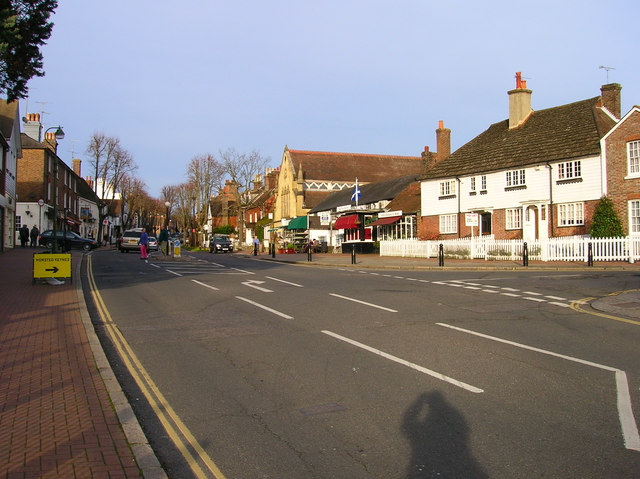
Lindfield High St

The Eastern Road Nature Reserve, off Lewes Road, is a 9-acre (3.6 ha) reserve alongside the Scrase Stream, which provides a wetland habitat for birds, butterflies and insects. It is situated on the site of a former sewage treatment plant, and has been allowed to develop since the plant closed in 1975. The diverse vegetation supports populations of insects and butterflies, which together with autumn fruits, attract visiting birds such as warblers, finches and siskins. Frogs, newts, dragonflies and other aquatic insects occupy the wetland areas.

The countryside around Lindfield is part of the High Weald Area of Outstanding Natural Beauty, which runs through Sussex, Surrey and Kent. The High Weald is an ancient landscape, characterised by small fields, woodlands, rolling hills, steep narrow valleys, heaths and sandstone outcrops, and this type of landscape is rare in Europe. Nearby is Ashdown Forest, some five miles (8.0 km) to the northeast of the village.

Footpaths with views across the Ouse valley radiate into the High Weald from Lindfield. The High Weald Landscape Trail and Sussex Border Path pass close to Lindfield linking with these local paths.

== Sports ==
Lindfield Football Club was established in 1898 and currently has three senior teams within the Mid-Sussex Football League, with the first team competing in the Premier Division, the Reserves competing in 3rd Division as well as a third side playing in the 7th Division. In the 2012–13 season, Lindfield Reserves won the Mowatt Cup Final as well as the Third team gained promotion from Division 6 as they finished runner's up. In 2014 the Reserves also won two cups and finished second in the league, gaining promotion. Last season the First team regained the Montgomery Cup which they followed up with the season opening Allen Washer Trophy in 2016.

All teams currently play their home games on the Lindfield Common which houses two senior side pitches and a club house, which is shared with Lindfield Cricket Club who use the green during the Cricket season. The cricket club also play at Hickman's Lane, which also offers an additional senior pitch made available by the Mid-Sussex County Council, and at Great Walstead School.

Lindfield Bowls Club is one of the oldest lawn bowling clubs in Sussex (founded in 1903), and is located close to the cricket club, at the top end of the Common, on the other side of Backwoods Lane. The club currently has over 120 members and has enjoyed success at county and national levels over the years. The club competes in the Sussex and Surrey "Border League", the Mid-Sussex League, the John Spriggs League, the Nellie Mercer League, and the Nicholas Soames League.

== Notable residents ==
- Frank Reginald Carey, Royal Air Force ace fighter pilot.
- John Bent, English Tory politician.
- Brett Anderson, English singer.

== See also ==
- All Saints Church, Lindfield
