= Eastern Road Nature Reserve =

Local Nature Reserve in England

Coordinates: 51.010°N 0.073°W

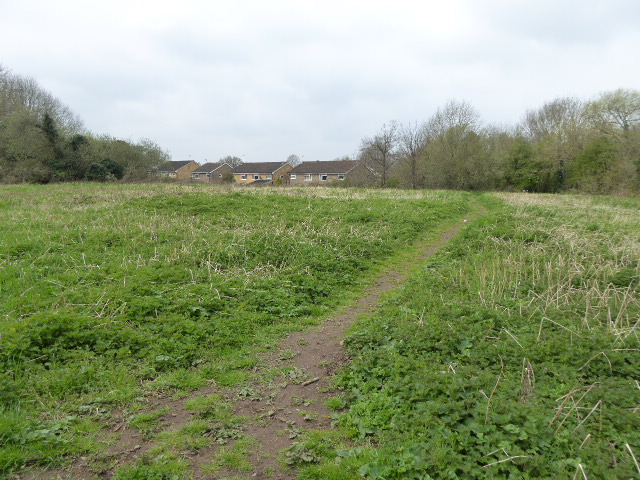
- Interactive map of Eastern Road Nature Reserve
- Type: Local Nature Reserve
- Location: Haywards Heath, West Sussex
- OS grid: TQ 353 252
- Area: 3.5 hectares (8.6 acres)
- Manager: Mid Sussex District Council

Eastern Road Nature Reserve is a 3.5-hectare (8.6-acre) Local Nature Reserve on the eastern outskirts of Haywards Heath in West Sussex. It is owned and managed by Mid Sussex District Council.

The reserve has rough grassland, wetland, woodland and scrub. There are aquatic insects such as dragonflies and other invertebrates include frogs and newts.

There is access from Eastern Road
