= Gonville =

Gonville may refer to:

- Gonville, New Zealand, a suburb of Whanganui
- Gonville Bromhead (1845–1891), British Army officer awarded the Victoria Cross
- Gonville ffrench-Beytagh (1912–1991), Anglican priest and anti-apartheid activist
- Edmund Gonville (died 1351), founder of the college Gonville Hall, another college, two religious houses and a hospital, King's Clerk to King Edward III of England

== See also ==
- Gonville and Caius College, Cambridge, a constituent college of the University of Cambridge, descended from Gonville Hall
- Gonville and Caius Range, a mountain range in Antarctica
