= Hazel O'Connor discography =

- Studio albums: 15
- EPs: 2
- Soundtrack albums: 1
- Live albums: 8
- Compilation albums: 3
- Singles: 37

This is the discography of British singer-songwriter Hazel O'Connor.

== Albums ==
=== Studio albums ===
Title	Album details	Peak chart positions	
Title	Album details	UK	UK Indie
Sons and Lovers	Released: 28 November 1980; Label: Albion; Formats: LP, MC	—	5
Cover Plus	Released: 28 August 1981; Label: Albion; Formats: LP, MC	32	4
Smile	Released: October 1984; Label: RCA; Formats: LP, MC	—	—
To Be Freed	Released: 1993; Label: Columbia; Formats: CD, MC	—	—
Private Wars	Released: 1995; Label: Epic; Formats: CD	—	—
5 in the Morning	Released: 1997; Label: Mystic; Formats: CD	—	—
Beyond the Breaking Glass	Released: 2000; Label: Ad Hoc Music; Formats: CD	—	—
Ignite (as X-ert featuring Hazel O’Connor)	Released: 2002; Label: Kikbak Music Publishing; Formats: CD	—	—
Hidden Heart	Released: 30 May 2005; Label: Invisible Hands Music; Formats: CD	—	—
The Bluja Project (with Clare Hirst and Sarah Fisher)	Released: 30 August 2010; Label: Half Step; Formats: CD	—	—
Breaking Glass Now (with the Subterraneans)	Released: 25 November 2010; Label: Ad Hoc; Formats: CD, digital download	—	—
I Give You My Sunshine (with Clare Hirst and Sarah Fisher)	Released: 24 October 2011; Label: Strike Force Entertainment; Formats: CD	—	—
Here She Comes (with Clare Hirst and Sarah Fisher)	Released: 3 March 2014; Label: Strike Force Entertainment; Formats: CD, digital download	—	—
See You Again (with Cormac de Barra)	Released: 26 January 2017; Label: Self-released; Formats: CD, digital download	—	—
Hallelujah Moments	Released: 22 October 2018; Label: Self-released; Formats: CD, digital download	—	—
"—" denotes releases that did not chart or were not released in that territory.

=== Soundtrack albums ===
Title	Album details	Peak chart positions					Certifications
Title	Album details	UK	AUS	NOR	SWE	US	Certifications
Breaking Glass	Released: 1 August 1980; Label: A&M; Formats: LP, MC	5	64	23	16	202	UK: Gold

=== Live albums ===
Title	Album details
Alive and Kicking in L.A.	Released: 1990; Label: Allied West Entertainments; Formats: MC; Limited tour edition release; subsequently released unofficially as bootlegs
Live… Over the Moon	Released: 1993; Label: Columbia; Formats: CD
Live in Berlin	Released: 1997; Label: Start Entertainments Limited; Formats: CD
Acoustically Yours	Released: 2002; Label: Invisible Hands Music; Formats: CD
Fighting Back – Live in Brighton (with the Subterraneans)	Released: 2005; Label: Recall 2cd; Formats: 2xCD
Access All Areas	Released: 18 March 2016; Label: Edsel; Formats: CD+DVD, digital download
Will You – Live in Brighton	Released: 31 August 2018; Label: Secret; Formats: 2xCD+DVD, digital download
Live Lounge (with Cormac de Barra and Roger Taylor)	Released: 18 November 2020; Label: Self-released; Formats: CD

=== Compilation albums ===
Title	Album details
Greatest Hits	Released: 1993; Label: Success; Formats: CD; Portugal-only release
See the Writing on the Wall	Released: 1994; Label: Line/Albion; Formats: CD; Germany-only release
A Singular Collection – The Best of Hazel O'Connor	Released: October 2003; Label: Invisible Hands Music; Formats: CD

== EPs ==
Title	Album details
Compact Hits	Released: 1988; Label: A&M; Formats: CD
Re-Joyce	Released: 6 December 2010; Label: Ad Hoc Music; Formats: CD, digital download

== Singles ==
Title	Year	Peak chart positions				Certifications	Album
Title	Year	UK	UK Indie	AUS	IRE	Certifications	Album
"Ee-I-Adio"	1979	—	—	—	—		Non-album single
"Writing on the Wall"	1980	—	—	—	—		Breaking Glass
"Eighth Day"	1980	5	—	78	7	UK: Silver	Breaking Glass
"Give Me an Inch"	1980	41	—	—	—		Breaking Glass
"Time"	1980	—	30	—	—		Sons and Lovers
"D-Days"	1981	10	2	96	11	UK: Silver	Sons and Lovers
"Will You?"	1981	8	—	—	7	UK: Silver	Breaking Glass
"(Cover Plus) We're All Grown Up"	1981	41	5	—	29		Cover Plus
"Hanging Around"	1981	45	10	—	26		Cover Plus
"Calls the Tune"	1982	60	—	—	—		Breaking Glass
"That's Life"	1982	—	—	—	—		Cover Plus
"Don't Touch Me"	1984	81	—	—	23		Smile
"Just Good Friends"	1984	142	—	—	—		Smile
"Cuts Too Deep"	1984	146	—	—	—		Smile
"Stranger in a Strange Land" (with KFT; Hungary-only release)	1985	—	—	—	—		Non-album single
"Push and Shove" (with Chris Thompson)	1985	—	—	—	—		Greenpeace – The Album
"Fighting Back" (with the Arts Freedom Singers; from Fighting Back)	1986	—	—	—	—		Non-album singles
"Today Could Be So Good" (From Prospects)	1986	—	—	—	—		Non-album singles
"And I Dream" (with David Easter; from Howard Goodall's Girlfriends)	1987	—	—	—	—		Non-album singles
"My Friend Jack" (Germany and Austria-only release)	1993	—	—	—	—		To Be Freed
"Time After Time" (Austria-only release)	1993	—	—	—	—		To Be Freed
"Tell Me Why" (Germany-only release)	1993	—	—	—	—		To Be Freed
"Refugees of Love" (Austria-only release)	1994	—	—	—	—		Private Wars
"Private War" (Austria-only release)	1995	—	—	—	—		Private Wars
"All I've Been Missing" (Germany promo-only release)	1995	—	—	—	—		Private Wars
"Na, Na, Na"	1997	—	—	—	—		5 in the Morning
"One More Try"	2004	—	—	—	—		A Singular Collection – The Best of Hazel O'Connor
"Perfect Days"	2005	—	—	—	—		Hidden Heart
"I'll See You Again" (with Moya Brennan)	2006	—	—	—	—		Hidden Heart
"(World Stops) Spinning Without You" (with the Subterraneans)	2010	—	—	—	—		Breaking Glass Now
"—" denotes releases that did not chart or were not released in that territory.

=== As featured artist ===
Title	Group	Year	Peak chart positions		
Title	Group	Year	UK	IRE	
"Why Don't You Answer"	Eberhard Schoener featuring Hazel O'Connor	1985	—	—	
"Let It Be"	Zeebrugge Ferry Disaster charity ensemble	1987	1	2	
"The Wishing Well"	Great Ormond Street Hospital charity ensemble	1987	22	—	
"Rap Against Rape (What Did I Do Wrong)"	Jocks & Co charity ensemble	1990	—	16	
"Talk to the Animals"	Debbie Curtis Big Band Aid featuring Hazel O'Connor and others	2015	—	—	
"Lullaby for the World"	Michael Scott featuring Hazel O'Connor	2021	—	—	
" Will You?"	Ferocious Dog (feat. Hazel O'Connor)	2021	2021	—	—
"Cov"	Coventry City of Culture 2021 featuring Hazel O'Connor and others	—	2021	—	
"—" denotes releases that did not chart or were not released in that territory.
