= Cover Plus =

1981 studio album by Hazel O'Connor

Studio album by Hazel O'Connor
- Released: 28 August 1981
- Recorded: May–June 1981
- Studio: Good Earth Studios, London
- Genre: New wave; pop rock
- Length: 45:32
- Label: Albion
- Producer: Tony Visconti

Hazel O'Connor chronology
Sons and Lovers (1980)	Cover Plus (1981)	Smile (1984)

Singles from Cover Plus
- 1. "(Cover Plus) We're All Grown Up" Released: 17 July 1981; 2. "Hanging Around" Released: September 1981; 3. "That's Life" Released: April 1982

Cover Plus is the third album by English singer Hazel O'Connor, released in August 1981 by Albion Records. The album charted at number 32 on the UK Albums Chart. It was reissued on CD with bonus tracks on 17 November 2017 by Cherry Red Records.

== Background ==
On the back of the success of the Breaking Glass film and album, O'Connor released her first 'proper' album Sons and Lovers, produced by Nigel Gray. Despite including the Top-Ten hit "D-Days", the album failed to chart. This came as somewhat as a surprise, with O'Connor wanting to move on from the acting success of Kate in the film. Yet the album followed the same format of Breaking Glass album and in some parts it seemed as though she was trying too hard and coming over "a bit melodramatic and actor-ish vocally". Therefore, it was with some caution that O'Connor approached Cover Plus.

== Content ==
The album was produced by Tony Visconti, who had produced Breaking Glass, and combines several cover songs with original compositions, many of which were autobiographical. The cover artwork, by Edward Bell suggests O'Connor was moving away from the "peroxide punk look in favour of a more Bowie-esque style".

Four singles were released from the album. The title track "(Cover Plus) We're All Grown Up" is about being discovered playing doctors and nurses and is also about a loss of innocence. It peaked at number 41 on the UK Singles Chart. The only other single to chart was a cover of The Stranglers' "Hanging Around", which peaked at number 45 in the UK. "Men of Good Fortune" is a cover of a song by Lou Reed and was also given away with the ninth issue of Flexipop! magazine in August 1981. The last single released was "That's Life", which was written in the style of Édith Piaf and is a song about having no regrets over a broken romance. At the time of the release of the singles and the album, A&M Records were still promoting Breaking Glass, with "Will You?" released in May 1981 and "Calls the Tune" released in January 1982, which may have affected the commercial performance of Cover Plus.

"Ee-I-Addio" is a reworking of O'Connor's 1979 debut single "Ee-I-Adio" about childhood domestic abuse. The title comes from the nursery rhyme "The Farmer in the Dell". The original version is also included on the extended edition of the album. "Not for You" is about refusal to make promises in a personal relationship that could affect her own ideals of freedom. "Animal Farm (We Will Be Happy?)" is a take on the book by George Orwell. "Runaway" is about O'Connor's experience of running away to Amsterdam when she was 16. Another cover on the album is "Do What You Gotta Do", written by Jimmy Webb. O'Connor switches the genders around so that it is sung from her perspective.

The reissue's bonus tracks include "Time is Free", which was the B-side to the single release of "D-Days" from Sons and Lovers. Recorded a year before Cover Plus, it is more punky than the rest of the album. The next track, "White Room" was the B-side to "Cover Plus (We're All Grown Up)" and is softer and more folky, a style O'Connor would move into in later years. The final three bonus tracks are foreign language versions of album tracks: a rather fitting version of "That's Life" in French, as well as "Dawn Chorus" also in French, and "Not for You" in German.

== Reception ==
Professional ratings
Review scores
Source	Rating
Record Mirror	4/5 stars
Smash Hits	3/10 stars

Reviewing the album for NME, Lynn Hanna wrote "Everything she's done so far has had that sense of something slight, sensationalised. On 'Cover Plus' this problem is compounded by her habit of picking on the most serious subjects and turning them into trite, often plain silly, observations with an added gloss of unconvincing melodrama. To take a thing like wife-beating and the whole horrible subject of family discord, called it 'Ee-I-Addio' and add a real kiddie chorus smacks of offensive emotional trickery rather than real hard heartbreak. By the same token 'Animal Farm (We Will Be Happy)' is a pointless treatment of George Orwell's celebrated political fable delivered in portentous tones that are insultingly empty."

Red Starr, reviewing for Smash Hits, wrote "No place for the sensitive this, as the utterly artless Hazel O'Nonotagain over-acts her way through another batch of spectacularly awful self-penned songs... plus a couple of equally hamfisted cover versions." The reviewer did however say that "her band are pretty good and she can knock out a reasonable tune."

However, reviewing the album for Record Mirror, Simon Tebbutt was much more positive, writing that the songs are "about her own life and experiences but don't somehow smack of the self indulgence and introspection I've come to associate with some many "me" writers. The lyrics might look flat on paper but take on an added dimension when coupled with the music. Even the covers of other people's work come over as felt rather than merely recited." Tebbutt concluded that the album "is certainly more sophisticated than what's gone before. There is a kind of muted feel about it but, like everything, if you like Hazel O'Connor you'll like it. I was never sure before if it was the music or the personality, but this album gives you a clearer idea of both."

== Track listing ==
All tracks are written by Hazel O'Connor, except where noted

Side one
No.	Title	Writer(s)	Length
1.	"Cover Plus (We're All Grown Up)"		4:04
2.	"Hanging Around"	Hugh Cornwell, Jean-Jacques Burnel, Dave Greenfield, Jet Black	4:11
3.	"Ee-I-Addio"		3:42
4.	"Not for You"		2:45
5.	"Hold On"		4:28
6.	"So You're Born"		3:26

Side two
No.	Title	Writer(s)	Length
7.	"Dawn Chorus"		4:00
8.	"Animal Farm (We Will Be Happy?)"		4:05
9.	"Runaway"		3:20
10.	"Do What You Gotta Do"	Jimmy Webb	3:47
11.	"Men of Good Fortune"	Lou Reed	3:10
12.	"That's Life"		4:34
Total length:			45:32

2017 bonus tracks:

No.	Title	Length
13.	"Cover Plus (We're All Grown Up)" (7" Edit)	3:42
14.	"Ee-I-Addio" (Original 1979 Single Version)	3:15
15.	"Time is Free"	3:28
16.	"White Room"	2:56
17.	"Dawn Chorus" (French Version)	4:03
18.	"That's Life" (French Version)	4:29
19.	"Not for You" (German Version)	2:45

== Personnel ==
Musicians

- Hazel O'Connor – vocals
- Wesley Magoogan – saxophone, lyricon, backing vocals
- Eddie Case – drums, electronic drums, backing vocals
- Neil O'Connor – guitar, backing vocals
- Andy "Roots" Qunta – keyboards, backing vocals
- Steve Kinch – bass guitar, backing vocals
- Delaney Visconti, Jessica Visconti, Nicholas Donovan (as the Kids); Mary Hopkin, Lizzie Donovan (as the Mums) – additional backing vocals

Technical

- Gordon Fordyce, Chris Porter – engineers
- Edward Bell – sleeve artwork
- Arranged by Hazel O'Connor, Tony Visconti and Megahype (the backing band)
- Recorded and mixed at Good Earth Studios, London, May–June 1981

== Charts ==
Chart (1981)	Peak position
UK Albums (OCC)	32
UK Indie Albums (MRIB)	4
