= Primitive Man (album) =

- 1982 Australian release (Regular Records)

Studio album by Icehouse
- Released: 20 September 1982
- Recorded: May 1982
- Studios: Paradise Studios, Sydney; Westlake Audio, Eldorado and Musicland West Studios, Los Angeles
- Genre: Synth-pop
- Length: 42:45
- Label: Chrysalis
- Producers: Iva Davies; Keith Forsey

Icehouse chronology
Icehouse (1980)	Primitive Man (1982)	Fresco EP (1983)

Singles from Primitive Man
- 1. "Great Southern Land" Released: August 1982; 2. "Hey Little Girl" Released: November 1982; 3. "Street Café" Released: March 1983; 4. "Uniform" Released: 1983 (US/European release only)

Love in Motion
- 1983 UK release (Chrysalis Records)

Professional ratings
Review scores
Source	Rating
AllMusic	4/5 stars
Rolling Stone	3/5 stars

Primitive Man is the second studio album by Australian rock band Icehouse, released on 20 September 1982 by Chrysalis Records. In January 1982, Icehouse founder Iva Davies started recording Primitive Man essentially as a solo project. It was co-produced with Keith Forsey, who later worked with Simple Minds and Billy Idol. Forsey supplied additional percussion; Davies supplied vocals, lead guitar, keyboards (Prophet-5), bass guitar and programmed the Linn drum machine.

Released as an Icehouse album, Primitive Man reached number 3 on the National album charts and provided their international breakthrough single, "Hey Little Girl", which peaked at number 7 in Australia, number 2 in Switzerland, number 5 in Germany, the top 20 in UK, Sweden and Netherlands, and number 31 on the US Billboard Mainstream Rock chart. Another single "Great Southern Land" made the Australian top 5; it was later featured in the 1988 Yahoo Serious film Young Einstein, and remains their most popular song according to listeners of Triple M in 2007.

The inner sleeve cover art of the album includes cut-up paper strips with hand-written song lyrics. Davies wrote "Great Southern Land" using the William S. Burroughs styled cut-up technique to encapsulate Australia in one song.

To promote Primitive Man on tour, Davies re-assembled Icehouse with Michael Hoste (keyboards) and John Lloyd (drums), and new members: Bob Kretschmer (guitar, backing vocals), Guy Pratt (bass guitar, backing vocals) and Andy Qunta (keyboards, backing vocals).

After the United Kingdom top 20 chart success of "Hey Little Girl" the album was re-released as Love in Motion in 1983 and contained the same tracks in different order except "Break These Chains" being replaced by "Love in Motion"; the alternate cover work was a still from the Russell Mulcahy directed video for "Hey Little Girl" (see infobox below right). In 1996, Icehouse released a compilation album called Love in Motion on dIVA / Massive Records, which contains "Love in Motion" but does not have any material from the original Australian release of Primitive Man.

Primitive Man represented a slight departure from earlier material and a move from the more rock-based style of their first album to the synth-based, more atmospheric albums such as Sidewalk and Measure for Measure. This style is exemplified in "Hey Little Girl", a very relaxed, introspective song which reflects the overall tone of the album punctuated by the heavier "Glam" and the more dance-based "Mysterious Thing". The final track "Goodnight Mr. Matthews" was Iva Davies by his own account directly referencing John Lennon's songwriting and singing style for the first and only time.

The "Street Café" music video clip was filmed in Tunisia, in a four-day visit into which was packed with difficult, unpleasant, and hazardous living experiences for performers and film crew alike. Iva Davies flew out of Tunisia still covered with dust and camel dung, clad in the boots, breeches, and bandolier used in the filming, and vowing never to return to that part of the world again.

"Break These Chains" appeared in the 1986 film Car Trouble and included on the related Car Trouble: The Original Soundtrack album.

The track "Trojan Blue" was used in the 2022 Australian psychological thriller movie The Stranger where actor Sean Harris plays a man who dances to the long opening of this song.In 2014 Steve Kilbey of Australian band The Church said of the song: “I would've thought it would be really hard for someone to pull off a song about the Trojan War or the Iliad, which is one of my favourite things, but Iva does it with total aplomb and finishes it off with some beautiful oboe playing.”

== Track listing ==
All songs written by Iva Davies.

=== 1982 Australian release ===
No.	Title	Length
1.	"Great Southern Land"	5:19
2.	"Uniform"	4:14
3.	"Street Café"	4:13
4.	"Hey Little Girl"	4:25
5.	"Glam" (Instrumental)	3:27
6.	"Trojan Blue"	5:03
7.	"One by One"	4:02
8.	"Break These Chains"	3:43
9.	"Mysterious Thing"	4:26
10.	"Goodnight Mr. Matthews" (re-recording)	4:00

1983 CD bonus tracks
No.	Title	Length
11.	"Over the Line" (B-side to "Street Café" single)	2:46
12.	"Uniform" (German version, B-side to "Great Southern Land" single)	4:06
13.	"Glam" (12" version, B-side to "Hey Little Girl" 12" single)	6:34
14.	"Hey Little Girl" (12" version)	6:59

2002 CD bonus tracks
No.	Title	Length
11.	"Over the Line"	2:46
12.	"Glam" (12" version)	6:34
13.	"Uniform" (12" German version)	6:07
14.	"Street Café" (single mix)	4:34
15.	"Love in Motion" (USA recording)	3:37
16.	"Can't Help Myself" (live)	5:39
17.	"We Can Get Together" (live)	3:55

2012 CD bonus tracks
No.	Title	Length
11.	"Over the Line"	2:46
12.	"Glam" (12" version)	6:34
13.	"Uniform" (German version)	4:06
14.	"Hey Little Girl" (12" version)	6:59
15.	"Street Café" (single mix)	4:34
16.	"Love in Motion" (USA recording)	3:37

=== 1983 US / UK release ===
1983 US/UK release (renamed Love in Motion)
No.	Title	Length
1.	"Uniform"	4:15
2.	"Street Cafe"	4:13
3.	"Hey, Little Girl"	4:25
4.	"Glam"	3:27
5.	"Great Southern Land"	5:19
6.	"Trojan Blue"	5:03
7.	"Love in Motion"	4:02
8.	"Mysterious Thing"	4:26
9.	"One by One"	4:03
10.	"Goodnight Mr. Matthews"	4:00

== Personnel ==
Credited to:

Icehouse members

- Iva Davies – vocals, guitar, Sequential Circuits Prophet-5, bass guitar, Linn drum machine, Fairlight CMI
- Michael Hoste – keyboards (bonus tracks)
- Bob Kretschmer – guitar (bonus tracks)
- John Lloyd – drums (bonus tracks)
- Guy Pratt – bass guitar (bonus tracks)

Additional musicians

- Keith Forsey – additional percussion
- Abraham Laboriel – bass guitar (bonus tracks)
- James SK Wān – bamboo flute

Recording details

- Mixing – Cameron Allan, Bob Clearmountain, Iva Davies, Keith Forsey
- Engineer – Dave Jerden, Brian Reeves, David Price, Rick Butz
- Produced – Iva Davies, Keith Forsey
- Digital remastering (2002) – Iva Davies, Ryan Scott

Art work

- Front Cover – Bill Tom
- Sleeve & Back Cover Photography – Craig Dietz
- Cover Concept – Janet Levinson, Iva Davies
- Cover design (Love in Motion) – David Storey

== Charts ==
=== Weekly charts ===
Chart (1982/83)	Peak Position
Australian (Kent Music Report)	3
New Zealand Albums (RMNZ)	1
Swedish Albums (Sverigetopplistan)	31
UK Albums (Official Charts)	64
Canada Top Albums/CDs (RPM)	59
US Billboard 200	129

=== Year-end charts ===
Chart (1982)	Peak position
Australian Albums (Kent Music Report)	18
New Zealand Albums (RMNZ)	11
Chart (1983)	Position
German Albums (Offizielle Top 100)	24
New Zealand Albums (RMNZ)	6

== Certifications ==
Region	Certification	Certified units/sales
Australia (ARIA)	Platinum	50,000^{^}
New Zealand (RMNZ)	Platinum	15,000^{^}
^{^} Shipments figures based on certification alone.
