= D-Days =

1981 single by Hazel O'Connor

- UK cover

Single by Hazel O'Connor

from the album Sons and Lovers
- B-side: "Time is Free"
- Released: March 1981
- Recorded: 1980
- Studio: Good Earth Studios, London
- Genre: New wave
- Length: 2:48 (single version); 3:10 (album version)
- Label: Albion
- Songwriter(s): Hazel O'Connor
- Producer(s): Nigel Gray

Hazel O'Connor singles chronology
| "Time" (1980) | "D-Days" (1981) | "Will You?" (1981) |

"D-Days" is a song by British singer-songwriter Hazel O'Connor, released in March 1981 as a single from her second album, Sons and Lovers. The single was produced by Nigel Gray and remixed for single release by Tony Visconti, who had produced her previous album Breaking Glass. The song stands for 'Decadent Days' and was inspired by a trip to a night in London where there were lots of poseurs and "people looking very bizarre". It peaked at number 10 on the UK Singles Chart.

== Reception ==
Reviewing the song for Record Mirror, Rosalind Russell wrote that "the smart marching pace suits Hazel's sense of style and drama and she hasn't deviated too far from her previous material to risk failure. This has a slap-in-the-face sting to it that should see her through to another hit". David Hepworth for Smash Hits wrote "eight bars into this and I'm reaching for Red Starr's [sic] Russian fur hat and cossack dancing round the office like a good'un. Hazel keeps the mannerisms down to a minimum and seems to have her best chance of a hit in a while.

== Track listings ==
7": Albion / ION 1009 (UK)

1. "D-Days" – 2:48
2. "Time is Free" – 3:28

12": Albion / 12 ION 1009 (UK)

1. "D-Days"
2. "Zoo"
3. "Time is Free"

== Personnel ==
Musicians

- Hazel O'Connor – lead vocals
- Eddie Case – drums, backing vocals
- Andy Qunta – keyboards, backing vocals
- Neil O'Connor – guitar, backing vocals
- Steve Kinch – bass guitar, backing vocals
- Wesley Magoogan – saxophone, backing vocals

Technical

- Gordon Fordyce – recording engineer, mixing (only "Time is Free")
- Tony Visconti – mixing (only "D-Days")
- Nigel Gray – producer
- Edward Bell – sleeve artwork

== Charts ==
| Chart (1981) | Peak position |
|---|---|
| Australia (Kent Music Report) | 96 |
| Ireland (IRMA) | 11 |
| UK Singles (OCC) | 10 |
| UK Indie Singles (MRIB) | 2 |
