= Sons and Lovers (disambiguation) =

Sons and Lovers is a 1913 D. H. Lawrence novel.

Sons and Lovers may also refer to:

- Sons and Lovers (film), a 1960 film directed by Jack Cardiff
- Sons and Lovers (album), a 1980 album by Hazel O'Connor
- Sons and Lovers (TV serial), a 1981 BBC serial directed by Stuart Burge
