= The Heartbreak Kid =

The Heartbreak Kid may refer to:

== Films ==
- The Heartbreak Kid (1972 film), an American film starring Charles Grodin and Cybill Shepherd
- The Heartbreak Kid (1993 film), an Australian film starring Claudia Karvan and Alex Dimitriades
- The Heartbreak Kid (2007 film), an American film starring Ben Stiller and Malin Akerman

== Other ==
- A 1974 song by Bo Donaldson and the Heywoods
- A 1987 song by Icehouse from their album Man of Colours
- Nickname of the American professional wrestler Shawn Michaels
