= Sons and Lovers (album) =

1980 studio album by Hazel O'Connor

Studio album by Hazel O'Connor
- Released: 28 November 1980
- Recorded: October 1980
- Studio: Good Earth Studios, London
- Genre: New wave; pop rock; post-punk
- Length: 41:52
- Label: Albion
- Producer: Nigel Gray

Hazel O'Connor chronology
Breaking Glass (1980)	Sons and Lovers (1980)	Cover Plus (1981)

Singles from Sons and Lovers
- 1. "Waiting" Released: 1980 (Australia only); 2. "Time" Released: December 1980; 3. "D-Days" Released: March 1981

Sons and Lovers is the second album by English singer Hazel O'Connor, released in November 1980 by Albion Records. It was reissued on CD with bonus tracks on 30 March 2018 by Cherry Red Records.

== Background and release ==
Earlier in 1980, O'Connor had starred in the film Breaking Glass as well as writing and singing the soundtrack album. Both were extremely successful, thrusting O'Connor into the limelight. However, afterwards, O'Connor wanted to differentiate herself from her character, Kate, in the film and make a clean break as a singer.

The album was produced by Nigel Gray, known for his work with the Police and Siouxsie and the Banshees. Three singles were released from the album: "Time" failed to chart on the UK Singles Chart, but did peak at number 30 on the Indie Chart; "Waiting" was only released in Australia by Liberation Records; and "D-Days" was the album's biggest hit, peaking at number 10 on the Singles Chart. The album itself was intended to be released in January 1981, however it was finished early, so was released at the end of November 1980 to coincide with the start of O'Connor's first major British tour.

Because of the calibre of the producer and the top-ten hit single, it was expected that the album would have some success commercially. However, the album failed to chart on the UK Albums Chart, although it did peak at number 4 on the Indie Chart. The album's success may have been hindered by the fact that A&M Records were still promoting Breaking Glass, which is also something that could be said for O'Connor's following album Cover Plus.

The expanded edition re-release of the album in 2018 included five bonus tracks. The first two, "Ain't It Funny" and "Suffragette City", were recorded live at the Dominion Theatre in London and were the B-sides on the 12" release of "Time". "Suffragette City" is a cover of the David Bowie song and also features Simon Le Bon of Duran Duran as they were the supporting tour act for O'Connor. There are also two versions of "D-Days" as bonus tracks: the single version which was remixed by Tony Visconti from the album version, and an alternate 'New' version also from 1981. The other bonus track is the original 1979 version of "Time is Free", which was the B-side to O'Connor's debut single "Ee-I-Adio" (it was then re-recorded for the B-side to "D-Days").

== Reception ==
Professional ratings
Review scores
Source	Rating
Record Mirror	2/5 stars
Smash Hits	5/10

Reviewing the album for Record Mirror, Simon Ludgate wrote "O'Connor desperately wants to be recognised just as a singer and the new image is a frantic attempt to prove that. She's in the ironic position of trying to escape her own publicity, her own image, which is pushing her into a very small corner." "If only Hazel would sing her songs in a straightforward way and forget all that heavy nasal inflection. It's alright the once, but like Dexy's, after a whole album's worth all that stylised tweeting and moaning gets on your tits. Hazel has the talent somewhere – the potential is hinted at again and again. The trouble is, it don't seem to surface that often."

Reviewing for Smash Hits, David Hepworth wrote "On the plus side, Hazel is vocally well-equipped, able to turn out a tolerably neat tune and her band are correspondingly neat and to the point. On the minus side, she exhibits a distressing tendency to overplay the importance of nearly every line she utters; consequently, even the best of her compositions on this first solo album proper come over as stilted, shrill and occasionally extremely annoying."

In a retrospective review for Louder Than War, Ian Canty described the album as seeming "to fall between two stools. On one hand the urge to move away from her recent past, but on the other the music kept roughly the same format as Breaking Glass and she came over a bit melodramatic and actor-ish vocally" and that "the album did contain a fair dose of listenable New Wave Pop, the type of which was perhaps showing its age by the end of 1980, but still was enjoyable enough in small doses. Occasionally the vocal delivery and songs come over as a bit hectoring if you’re not in the mood for them, but for the most part the occasional heavy touch of the lyrics is offset by the bouncy musical accompaniment and all round brio. Too often it did seem Hazel was trying a little too hard and often appeared a little overwrought. O’Connor could write some interesting stuff in her songs, but it also must be noted that a few times there are more cringe-worthy efforts too."

== Track listing ==
All tracks are written by Hazel O'Connor, except where noted

Side one
No.	Title	Length
1.	"D-Days"	3:10
2.	"Waiting"	2:33
3.	"Who Will Care?"	3:13
4.	"Zoo"	4:32
5.	"Gigolo"	2:41
6.	"Do What You Do"	4:36

Side two
No.	Title	Writer(s)	Length
7.	"Sons and Lovers"		4:38
8.	"Glass Houses"		3:19
9.	"Ain't It Funny"		3:57
10.	"Danny Boy"	Traditional; arranged by Hazel O'Connor	2:30
11.	"Bye Bye"		3:18
12.	"Time (Ain't on Our Side)"		3:17
Total length:			41:52

2018 bonus tracks:

No.	Title	Writer(s)	Length
13.	"Ain't It Funny" (Live)		3:55
14.	"Suffragette City" (Live)	David Bowie	3:40
15.	"D-Days" (7” Visconti Version)		2:51
16.	"Time Is Free" (Original '79 Version)		2:53
17.	"D-Days" (Alternate '81 'New' Version)		3:35

== Personnel ==
Musicians

- Hazel O'Connor – lead vocals
- Andy Qunta – keyboards
- Neil O'Connor – guitar
- Wesley Magoogan – saxophone
- Wild Oscar – bass
- Gary Tibbs – bass
- Eddie Case – drums
- Lizzie Donovan – backing vocals

Technical

- Pete Buhlmann – engineer
- Edward Bell – sleeve artwork

== Charts ==
Chart (1981)	Peak position
UK Indie Albums (MRIB)	5
