= Will You =

Will You may refer to:

- "Will You", song by Joe Hinton, 1959
- "Will You?" (Hazel O'Connor song), 1981
- "Will You", song by Breathless (band), 1981
- "Will You" (P.O.D. song), 2003
- "Will You" (Singaporean song), a 2007 National Day Parade single by Singaporean artistes
