= Taking the Town =

Single by Icehouse

from the album Sidewalk
- B-side: "Dance On"
- Released: April 1984; December 1984 (Japan)
- Genre: New wave; synth-pop; pop rock
- Length: 3:34 (7"/ album version); 5:12 (12" extended dance mix)
- Label: Chrysalis; Regular
- Songwriter: Iva Davies
- Producer: Iva Davies

Icehouse singles chronology
"Uniform" (1983)	"Taking the Town" (1984)	"Don't Believe Anymore" (1984)

Music video
- "Taking the Town" on YouTube

"Taking the Town" is a song by Australian rock band Icehouse, written by Iva Davies. It was released in April 1984 as the lead single from their third studio album Sidewalk. It peaked at No. 29 on the Australian chart.

== Promotional music video ==
The music video for "Taking the Town" was filmed by Russell Mulcahy in Sydney, and used similar effects to Elton John's "Sad Songs (Say So Much)", filmed in Rushcutters Bay also by Russell Mulcahy when John was in Sydney for his first marriage. It did not feature Icehouse's then-keyboardist Andy Qunta, instead it featured a look-alike with his back to the camera.

== Track listing ==
- 12" Single
1. "Taking the Town (Extended Dance Mix)" – 5:11
2. "Dance On" – 3:54
3. "Taking the Town" – 3:32
- 7" Single
1. "Taking the Town" – 3:32
2. "Dance On" – 3:54

== Charts ==
Chart (1984)	Peak position
Australian (Kent Music Report)	29
New Zealand (Recorded Music NZ)	32
