= Roulston =

Roulston is a surname. Notable people with the surname include:

- Ben Roulston, English record producer
- Hayden Roulston (born 1981), New Zealand cyclist
- Rolly Roulston (1911–1983), Canadian ice hockey player
- Tom Roulston (born 1957), Canadian ice hockey player
