= Allied Stars =

Film production company owned by Mohamed Al-Fayed

Allied Stars Ltd. was a film production company created by Egyptian businessman Mohamed Al-Fayed in 1979. The firm was dissolved on March 3, 2020.

The company was formed as a subsidiary of United Star Shipping, part of the Fayed group. Al-Fayed appointed his son, Dodi Fayed as the chief executive. Allied Star's first production was the 1980 British film Breaking Glass, which starred Hazel O'Connor. The next production backed by Allied Stars was the drama Chariots of Fire, in which Al-Fayed invested £3 million and purchased a 25% stake in the film. The film was also financed by Twentieth Century Fox and distributed by Alan Ladd, Jr.'s The Ladd Company.

Before the completion of Chariots of Fire, Al-Fayed sold his stake for a share of the profits if the film succeeded. The film was a huge success and earned Allied Stars $6 million.

Keith Allen's 2011 documentary on the death of Diana, Princess of Wales, Unlawful Killing, was funded by Al-Fayed at a cost of £2.5 million, and produced by Allied Stars.
