= Measure for Measure (album) =

- Australian cover

Studio album by Icehouse
- Released: April 1986
- Recorded: August 1985
- Studios: Crescent Studios (Bath); Whitehouse (Livingston); Air Studios (London)
- Genres: Rock; new wave
- Length: 51:55
- Labels: Regular; Chrysalis
- Producers: David Lord; Rhett Davies

Icehouse chronology
Sidewalk (1984)	Measure for Measure (1986)	Man of Colours (1987)

Singles from Measure for Measure
- 1. "No Promises" Released: 28 October 1985; 2. "Baby, You're So Strange" Released: 10 March 1986; 3. "Mr. Big" Released: 16 June 1986; 4. "Cross the Border" Released: 20 October 1986; 5. "Paradise" Released: 1986 (US and UK only)

Alternative cover
- US cover

Professional ratings
Review scores
Source	Rating
AllMusic	2.5/5 stars

Measure for Measure is the fourth studio album by the Australian rock band Icehouse, released in April 1986 in Australia by Regular Records and in the United States by Chrysalis Records. It was one of the first three albums to be recorded entirely digitally.

== Recording ==
Lead vocalist Iva Davies said the album was the first time he had worked with producers he could "get on with" and also the first time they had a surplus of songs to choose from. "We've actually got more songs than we'll ever be able to use. It's very strange. It's created problems because they've all turned out really well and I'm loath to give anything away."

"No Promises" and "Regular Boys" are re-recorded tracks that were originally from the soundtrack album Boxes (1985).The recording of "Cross The Border" included Guy Pratt (later Pink Floyd) on bass, Steve Jansen on drums (formerly of the band Japan) and Brian Eno (of Roxy Music) on backing vocals and piano/keyboards.

The female vocals on the album's bonus track "Into The Wild" are co-credited to P.P. Arnold who in Australia is best known for the Small Faces song "Tin Soldier". An alternate techno-style version titled "Wild" appears on the 1994 Icehouse album Full Circle. Remixed and produced by Cameron Allan (who co-produced the debut Icehouse album in 1980) "Wild" is also listed in the end credits of the 1996 film Space Jam.

The track "The Flame" was written by Davies in reference to the Langa massacre which took place in South Africa in 1985 on the 25th anniversary of the Sharpeville massacre. Davies makes further reference at the opening of a live performance of the song in 1986 in New York City.

== Release and critical reception ==
The album, which peaked at number eight in Australia, features the singles "No Promises", "Baby, You're So Strange", "Mr. Big", "Cross the Border" and "Paradise". "No Promises" had been released as a 7-inch vinyl single in October 1985, it peaked at number 30 on the Australian singles chart. It was used for the Boxes ballet created to Sydney Dance Company's choreographer Graeme Murphy and Iva Davies.

Both "No Promises" and "Cross the Border" were remixed and released as 12-inch singles, and while a major US pop hit would elude them until the following year, "No Promises" went Top 10 on both the Billboard Rock tracks and Dance/Club charts. "Cross the Border" did not see as much club play in the US, but was a Top 20 rock hit there. In Australia, the two further singles lifted from the album, "Baby, You're So Strange" and "Mr. Big", both reached the top 20, higher than the Australian charting of the singles which achieved international success. "Paradise" was released late 1986 in US/UK as 7-inch (3:42) and 12-inch (4:47) singles, but achieved no notable chart success in either market.

There are various versions of this album; the Australian (Regular Records) and international (Chrysalis Records) releases each feature different artwork and track running order while the 2002 Australian remastered version features bonus tracks. The front cover artwork for the international version was by Norman Moore.

== Track listing ==
All tracks are written by Iva Davies and Robert Kretschmer, except where noted.

Australian release
No.	Title	Writer(s)	Length
1.	"Paradise"	Iva Davies	4:47
2.	"No Promises"		4:40
3.	"Mr Big"		3:33
4.	"Angel Street"		4:46
5.	"The Flame"	Davies	5:11
6.	"Regular Boys"		3:30
7.	"Cross the Border"		4:25
8.	"Spanish Gold"	Davies	4:17
9.	"Lucky Me" aka "American Way"		4:38
10.	"Baby, You're So Strange"		3:59

1993 reissue bonus tracks
No.	Title	Writer(s)	Length
11.	"Too Late Now"	Davies	3:11
12.	"Into the Wild"		4:53

2002 & 2012 remastered reissue bonus tracks
No.	Title	Writer(s)	Length
13.	"Just a Word"		4:26
14.	"The Perfect Crime"	Davies; Kretschmer; Andy Qunta; Masaki Tanazawa	3:38
15.	"The Flame" (live)	Davies	5:26
16.	"No Promises"		5:25
17.	"Sister" (live)	Davies; Michael Hoste	3:48

American release
No.	Title	Length
1.	"No Promises"
2.	"Cross the Border"
3.	"Spanish Gold"
4.	"Paradise"
5.	"The Flame"
6.	"Regular Boys"
7.	"Mr. Big"
8.	"Angel Street"
9.	"Lucky Me"
10.	"Baby, You're So Strange"
11.	"Too Late Now"
12.	"Into the Wild"

== Personnel ==
Credited to:

Icehouse

- Iva Davies – vocals, guitar, keyboards (Fairlight CMI), drum programming, bass guitar
- Simon Lloyd – reeds, brass, trumpet, keyboard programming, Fairlight CMI
- Robert Kretschmer – guitar
- Guy Pratt – bass guitar, fretless bass guitar
- Andy Qunta – keyboards, backing vocals
- Steve Jansen – drums, percussion (on "No Promises", "Cross the Border" and "The Flame")
- Masaki Tanazawa – drums, percussion

Additional musicians

- Brian Eno – backing vocals, piano, keyboards
- Stuart Gordon – strings
- Maurice Green – backing vocals
- Gasper Lawal – percussion
- David Lord – keyboards, string arrangement, percussion
- Shena Power – female voices
- Glen Tommey – percussion

Recording

- Engineer – Rhett Davies, David Lord, Andy Lyden, Iva Davies, Warne Livesey
  - Assistant – George Shilling, Matt Howe
- Mastering – Paul Ibbotson
- Mixing – David Hemmings, Warne Livesey, Glen Tommey
  - Assistant – Raine Shine
- Producer – Rhett Davies (2,3,4,7,10,11,12), David Lord (1,4,6,8,9)
- Digital remastering (2002) – Iva Davies, Ryan Scott

Artwork

- Brett Cabot – Cover Photography
- David McKenzie – Artwork
- Norman Moore - Artwork (international album cover)

== Charts ==
=== Weekly charts ===
Weekly chart performance for Measure for Measure
Chart (1986)	Peak position
Australian Albums (Kent Music Report)	8
Dutch Albums (Album Top 100)	64
German Albums (Offizielle Top 100)	37
New Zealand Albums (RMNZ)	2
US Billboard 200	55

=== Year-end charts ===
Year-end chart performance for Measure for Measure
Chart (1986)	Position
Australian Albums (Kent Music Report)	38
New Zealand Albums (RMNZ)	19

== Certifications ==
Certifications for Measure for Measure
Region	Certification	Certified units/sales
Australia (ARIA)	Gold	35,000^{^}
New Zealand (RMNZ)	Gold	7,500^{^}
^{^} Shipments figures based on certification alone.
