= Crazy (Icehouse song) =

Single by Icehouse

from the album Man of Colours
- B-side: "Completely Gone"
- Released: 8 June 1987
- Genre: Synth-pop; new wave
- Length: 3:24
- Label: Regular (Australia); Chrysalis (rest of the world)
- Songwriters: Iva Davies; Robert Kretschmer; Andy Qunta
- Producer: David Lord

Icehouse singles chronology
"Paradise" (1986)	"Crazy" (1987)	"Electric Blue" (1987)

Music video
- "Crazy" on YouTube

"Crazy" is a song by the Australian rock band Icehouse, released in 1987 as the first of five top 30 singles from their fifth studio album Man of Colours (1987). The single peaked at No. 4 on the Australian Kent Music Report and No. 14 on the Billboard Hot 100. The song was written by band members Iva Davies, Robert Kretschmer and Andy Qunta, and produced by David Lord. "Crazy" was picked up by every major radio station in Australia as soon as it was released.

== Music videos ==
Two versions of the music video exist; an Australian version, and a version for US markets.

=== Australian version ===
The Australian version features Davies wandering through the disused Pyrmont Power Station in the Sydney suburb of Pyrmont while various events occur around him, such as explosions, a car crashing and various people wandering through the scene. It was shot in one continuous take.

=== US release ===
The US version was directed by John Jopson and features a longer version of the song than the Australian release. It was filmed in Sydney at the city's State Theatre and at Radio 2SM DJ studio in McMahons Point, as well as at the Yester Grange estate at Wentworth Falls in the Blue Mountains.

It is based on the American neo-noir psychological thriller film Play Misty for Me (1971), with Davies hosting a late night radio show, and taking a request from a fan (Paris Jefferson), who asks "do you mind if I wake you tonight?". Davies misinterprets this as the request, but the caller goes on to say "can you play 'Crazy' for me?". The rest of the video shows Icehouse singing and playing instruments in an opulent 1920s era theatre. The final scene shows Davies meeting the caller, who has posters of Icehouse and Iva Davies plastered all over her wall. Davies gives a short uneasy smile, before leaving the house.

Part of the US version music video appears in a voice-over skit by Weird Al Yankovic in his 1988 MTV special AL-TV #3.

== Track listing ==
=== Australian release (7") ===
1. "Crazy"
2. "Completely Gone"

=== US promo release (12") ===
1. "Crazy (12" Mix)"
2. "Crazy (Midnight Mix)"
3. "Crazy (LP version)"
4. "No Promises (Live)

== Charts ==
=== Weekly charts ===
Chart (1987–1988)	Peak position
Australia (Australian Music Report)	4
Belgium (Ultratop 50 Flanders)	20
Canada Top Singles (RPM)	22
Netherlands (Dutch Top 40)	9
Netherlands (Single Top 100)	17
New Zealand (Recorded Music NZ)	10
UK Singles (Official Charts)	74
US Billboard Hot 100	14
US Cashbox	20
Chart (1988)	Peak position
UK Singles (Official Charts)	38

=== Year-end charts ===
Chart (1987)	Position
Australia (Australian Music Report)	18
Netherlands (Dutch Top 40)	96
New Zealand (Recorded Music NZ)	33
