= My Obsession (Icehouse song) =

1987 song by Icehouse

Single by Icehouse

from the album Man of Colours
- B-side: "Your Confession"
- Released: 1987
- Length: 3:59
- Label: Regular (AU); Chrysalis (US, Canada)
- Songwriters: Iva Davies; Robert Kretschmer
- Producer: David Lord

Icehouse singles chronology
"Electric Blue" (1987)	"My Obsession" (1987)	"Man of Colours" (1988)

"My Obsession" is a song by Australian rock band Icehouse, released in 1987 as the third of five top 30 singles from their fifth studio album, Man of Colours (1987). The song was written by Iva Davies and Robert Kretschmer, and was produced by David Lord. "My Obsession" was released in Australia in late 1987 and peaked at No. 12 on the Kent Music Report chart. The song was issued in North America in July 1988 and achieved a high of No. 88 on the US Billboard Hot 100.

== Music video ==
The song's music video was produced by Paul Flattery and directed by John Jopson. It was filmed in Minneapolis in April 1988 on a sound stage which had the same name as the band. The video achieved breakout rotation on MTV.

As these dates demonstrate, "My Obsession" had by then already peaked at No. 12 on the Australian charts, making it one of the last ever pop songs to achieve a high-chart performance without the support of an accompanying music video.

== Critical reception ==
On its release, Michael Wellham of The Canberra Times "Pop cliches tarted up with synthesisers. On the flip, 'Your Confession' is an instrumental. The title reveals as little imagination as the track." In a review of the single's release in the US, Billboard described "My Obsession" as "commercially tailored pop for the under-25 crowd". Cash Box praised the song as an "example of pop-rock record making at its best", adding that Davies "has a voice so crystalline, so precise that it grabs and holds you".

== Track listing ==
7–inch single (Australia 1987, US 1988)

1. "My Obsession" – 3:59
2. "Your Confession" – 4:12

Cassette single (US release)

1. "My Obsession" – 3:59
2. "Your Confession" – 4:12

7–inch single (US promo)

1. "My Obsession" – 3:59
2. "My Obsession" – 3:59

== Personnel ==
Icehouse

- Iva Davies – vocals
- Robert Kretschmer – guitar
- Simon Lloyd – keyboards, programming
- Stephen Morgan – bass
- Andy Qunta – keyboards, piano
- Paul Wheeler – drums

Production

- David Lord – producer of "My Obsession"
- David Hemming – engineer and mastering assistance on "My Obsession"
- Carrie Motzing, Greg Henderson – assistant engineers on "My Obsession"
- Michael Brauer – mixing on "My Obsession"
- Don Bartley – mastering on "My Obsession"
- Andy Qunta – producer of "Your Confession"
- Simon Lloyd – producer and mixing on "Your Confession"

== Charts ==
Chart (1987–88)	Peak position
Australia Kent Music Report	12
Canada Top Singles (RPM)	84
New Zealand (Recorded Music NZ)	14
US Billboard Hot 100	88
US Cash Box Top 100 Singles	86
