= Dusty Pages =

Single by Icehouse

from the album Sidewalk
- B-side: "Stay Close Tonight"
- Released: 26 November 1984
- Recorded: 1984
- Length: 3:50 (7" version); 4:45 (album version)
- Label: WEA; Chrysalis; Regular
- Songwriter: Iva Davies
- Producers: Iva Davies; John Brand

Icehouse singles chronology
"Don't Believe Anymore" (1984)	"Dusty Pages" (1984)	"No Promises" (1985)

Music video
- "Dusty Pages" on YouTube

"Dusty Pages" is a song by the Australian rock band Icehouse written by Iva Davies. It was released on 26 November 1984, and peaked at No. 82 on the Australian Kent Music Report singles chart. The third single released to promote their third studio album Sidewalk (1984), this was a re-recorded alternate version of the song co-produced by Iva Davies and John Brand.

== Charts ==
Chart (1984)	Peak position
Australia (Kent Music Report)	82
