= Will You? (Hazel O'Connor song) =

1981 single by Hazel O'Connor

Single by Hazel O'Connor

from the album Breaking Glass
- B-side: "Sons and Lovers" (UK and Ireland only); "Big Brother"
- Released: 8 May 1981
- Recorded: 1980
- Studio: Good Earth Studios, London
- Length: 4:49
- Label: A&M
- Songwriters: Hazel O'Connor; Wesley Magoogan
- Producer: Tony Visconti

Hazel O'Connor singles chronology
"D-Days" (1981)	"Will You?" (1981)	"(Cover Plus) We're All Grown Up" (1981)

"Will You?" is a song by British singer-songwriter Hazel O'Connor, released as the fourth single from her debut album, the soundtrack to the film Breaking Glass. It was a top ten hit in both the UK and Ireland, and was certified silver in the UK for shipments of 250,000 copies.

== Background ==
"Will You?" was the only track in Breaking Glass that was not written specifically for the film: in her 1981 autobiography Uncovered Plus, O'Connor stated that the song had been written some time before that. In 2014, she told The Guardian that she had been upset after reading a story about a man who had died when the shop he had entered to buy a sandwich had been blown up by an IRA bomb.

The song is noted for its lengthy alto saxophone solo, played by Wesley Magoogan. While touring the UK in November and December 1980 in support of her album, O'Connor was supported by the unknown Duran Duran, and in his autobiography the band's bass guitar, John Taylor, said that "Will You?" was "the highlight" of O'Connor's set, and called Magoogan's solo "the emotional peak of the show". The original release of "Will You?" was credited solely to O'Connor but Magoogan later won a court case to have his contribution to the song recognised and is credited as co-writer.

== Track listings ==
7" AMS 8131 (UK & Ireland)

1. "Will You?" – 4:49
2. "Sons and Lovers" – 4:37

7" AMS 9011 (France & Netherlands)

1. "Will You?" – 4:49
2. "Big Brother" – 3:04

7" 2267-S (US)

1. "Will You" – 2:57
2. "Big Brother" – 3:04

7" AMS 7698 (Italy)

1. "Eighth Day" – 3:11
2. "Will You?" – 4:49

12" Promo 12 PRM 018 (Italy)

1. "Will You?" – 4:49
2. "Monsters in Disguise" – 3:22
3. "Writing on the Wall" – 3:20

== Charts ==
Chart (1981)	Peak position
Ireland (IRMA)	7
Israel (IBA)	1
UK Singles (Official Charts)	8
