= Sidewalk (album) =

Studio album by Icehouse
- Released: 26 June 1984
- Recorded: February 1984
- Studios: EMI Studios 301 (Sydney); Baby-Oh (Los Angeles); El Dorado (Los Angeles)
- Genres: New wave; synth-pop; pop rock
- Length: 45:09
- Labels: Chrysalis; Regular
- Producer: Iva Davies

Icehouse chronology
| Fresco EP (1983) | Sidewalk (1984) | Measure for Measure (1986) |

Singles from Sidewalk
- 1. "Taking the Town" Released: April 1984; 2. "Don't Believe Anymore" Released: 2 July 1984; 3. "Dusty Pages" Released: 26 November 1984

Professional ratings
Review scores
| Source | Rating |
|---|---|
| AllMusic (1984) | 1.5/5 stars |
| AllMusic (2002) | 2.5/5 stars |

Sidewalk is the third studio album by Australian rock band Icehouse, released on 26 June 1984 by Chrysalis Records and Regular Records. It peaked at No. 8 on the Australian national albums chart and No.2 in New Zealand. Founding member Iva Davies used the Fairlight CMI digital sampling synthesizer on this more sombre and reflective album.

In an interview with music journalist Debbie Kruger, Davies explained that while composing the instrumental score for Russell Mulcahy's 1984 film Razorback, he initially experimented with musical sketches that, while not used in the movie, were later developed into Sidewalk tracks "Shot Down" and "The Mountain". The latter track and others (notably "Don't Believe Anymore") include saxophone by Joe Camilleri, who also joined the Icehouse tour band. The album was also the first Icehouse recording for English bassist Guy Pratt. The 7" single release of "Dusty Pages" was a subsequently re-recorded alternate version.

In 2002, Warner Music re-released the album, digitally remastered by Davies and Ryan Scott, with four bonus tracks.

== Track listing ==
All songs written by Iva Davies.

Side one
| No. | Title | Length |
|---|---|---|
| 1. | "Taking the Town" | 3:34 |
| 2. | "This Time" | 4:15 |
| 3. | "Someone Like You" | 4:17 |
| 4. | "Stay Close Tonight" | 5:09 |
| 5. | "Don't Believe Anymore" | 5:18 |

Side two
| No. | Title | Length |
|---|---|---|
| 6. | "Sidewalk" | 4:08 |
| 7. | "Dusty Pages" | 4:48 |
| 8. | "On My Mind" | 3:43 |
| 9. | "Shot Down" | 5:02 |
| 10. | "The Mountain" | 4:52 |
| Total length: | | 45:09 |

2002 reissue bonus tracks
| No. | Title | Length |
|---|---|---|
| 11. | "Java" | 4:54 |
| 12. | "Dance On" | 3:58 |
| 13. | "Dusty Pages" (Single Version) | 4:03 |
| 14. | "Taking the Town" (Extended Version) | 5:09 |

== Personnel ==
Credits are adapted from the album's liner notes.

Icehouse

- Iva Davies – vocals; guitar; oboe; Fairlight CMI programming; drum programming
- Robert Kretschmer – guitar; backing vocals
- John Lloyd – drums; percussion; backing vocals
- Guy Pratt – bass guitar; backing vocals
- Andy Qunta – keyboards

Additional musicians

- Joe Camilleri – saxophone (tracks 2, 3, 5, 10)
- Remy Corps – backing vocals (track 1)
- James SK Wān – bamboo flute

Production

- Iva Davies – producer; engineer; mixing
- Andy Hilton – engineer
- Jim Taig – assistant engineer
- David Jerden – mixing

== Charts ==
=== Weekly charts ===
Weekly chart performance for Sidewalk
| Chart (1984–85) | Peak position |
|---|---|
| Australian Albums (Kent Music Report) | 8 |
| German Albums (Offizielle Top 100) | 39 |
| New Zealand Albums (RMNZ) | 2 |

=== Year-end charts ===
1984 year-end chart performance for Sidewalk
| Chart (1984) | Position |
|---|---|
| Australian Albums (Kent Music Report) | 44 |
| New Zealand Albums (RMNZ) | 40 |

== Certifications ==
| Region | Certification | Certified units/sales |
|---|---|---|
| New Zealand (RMNZ) | Gold | 7,500^{^} |
^{^} Shipments figures based on certification alone.
