= Breaking Glass (film) =

1980 film by Brian Gibson

- Theatrical release poster
- Directed by: Brian Gibson
- Written by: Brian Gibson
- Produced by: Davina Belling; Clive Parsons
- Starring: Phil Daniels; Hazel O'Connor; Jon Finch
- Cinematography: Stephen Goldblatt
- Edited by: Michael Bradsell
- Production company: Allied Stars
- Distributed by: GTO Films
- Release date: September 1980
- Running time: 104 minutes
- Country: United Kingdom
- Language: English
- Budget: $3 million

Breaking Glass is a 1980 British film starring Hazel O'Connor, Phil Daniels and Jonathan Pryce. It was co-produced by Dodi Fayed and written and directed by Brian Gibson, his feature film debut. The film depicts the rise and fall of Kate Crowley, an angry but creative young singer-songwriter.

The film was screened out of competition at the 1980 Cannes Film Festival.

The soundtrack album, featuring songs performed by O'Connor, reached number 5 in the UK and was certified Gold by the British Phonographic Industry. Two singles, "Eighth Day" and "Will You", both reached the UK Top 10.

== Plot ==
Kate Crowley is discovered by Danny, a young man who desperately wants to become a promoter of music bands. His agent forces him to buy hundreds of his artist's singles to rig the charts. Danny, impressed with Kate's talent, becomes her manager. After firing her band, he forms Kate's new band, "Breaking Glass". The band consists of Kate on vocals and keyboard, best friends Tony and Dave on lead and bass guitar respectively, the heroin-addicted and partially deaf Ken on saxophone and the 'mental' Mick on drums.

Danny struggles to promote the band. The best he can do is several nights in a pub frequented by neo-Nazis, which clashes with Kate's anarchist and liberal lyrics. After a brawl breaks out and the pub refuses to pay the band, Danny manages to persuade Kate to record a demo. Danny and Kate then take the demo to some gig promoters who show no interest. The band struggles to get by while being hassled by police, and in the meantime, Kate begins to fall in love with Danny. Eventually, the gig promoters offer the band a low contract that Danny describes as "feudal".

Several months later, the band tours the country, building a large fanbase. Eventually, Danny and Kate kiss and confess their feelings. Danny blackmails his former employer into attending a gig in London by threatening to reveal that he rigged the charts. Disaster strikes when the band begins to perform and a power-cut occurs. Encouraged by Danny and Mick, the band continues and wins the hostile crowd over. Impressed, the music agents offer a record contract.

The agents demand changes to some of the crude lyrics to secure airplay. The recording of the first album does not go well, and the agents reveal that they think Danny is the problem. Forced into playing at a Rock Against Racism benefit concert, the band tries to leave until they see a neo-Nazi rally approach. They decide to play one of their controversial songs, creating a riot. Danny wants the band to leave, but Kate taunts the crowd. Suddenly, a young man who has been stabbed falls right in front of her, horrifying Kate.

While recovering from her trauma, Kate is forced to audition for a famous producer, Bob Woods, who wants to produce her music and is romantically interested in her. Kate's new songs help her mental state, but the rest of the band are unhappy. Danny finds himself being pushed further into the sidelines and Ken does not play saxophone on the new single. The agents start sowing seeds of discontent among the band, targeting Danny. This leads to a confrontation after which Danny storms out and quits. Woods takes over as manager and becomes Kate's new lover.

After more success, including a platinum record, the band falls apart. Mick quits, claiming to be bored with the simplistic drum patterns he is forced to play. Kate hates the pressure and lack of control of her fame. Dave and Tony treat Ken terribly, hating him for being a junkie, and he quits the group. By now the band's name has been amended to "Kate & Breaking Glass".

During a radio show which invites listeners to call in, Kate has trouble understanding her fans and gets angry after callers accuse her of selling out, including one who sounds like Danny. Kate's latest single, "Big Brother", features the 'offensive' lyrics completely changed as the music agents wanted, indicating she has sold out. Mick and Ken meet with Danny and accuse him of abandoning them. After pleading with him to help Kate, he refuses.

The film ends with a concert at the Rainbow Theatre and the debut of a new song. Kate is forced to go on stage by Chris Campbell, who forcibly holds her down while a doctor injects her in the buttocks with more drugs. Kate goes on with the band, performing the song "Eighth Day". After the song finishes, Kate flees the stage into the London Underground, where she begins hallucinating people dressed as her and her former bandmates, and has a nervous breakdown. The final scene shows Kate catatonic at a mental hospital where Danny visits her with a synthesiser.

== Cast ==
- Phil Daniels – Danny
- Hazel O'Connor – Kate Crowley
- Jon Finch – Bob Woods
- Jonathan Pryce – Ken
- Peter-Hugo Daly – Mick
- Mark Wingett – Tony
- Gary Tibbs – Dave
- Charles Wegner – Chris Campbell
- Mark Wing-Davey – Fordyce
- Hugh Thomas – Davis
- Derek Thompson – Andy
- Nigel Humphreys – Brian
- Ken Campbell – Publican
- Lowri Ann Richards – Jane
- Peter Tilbury – CID Officer
- Zoot Money – Promotions Man
- Jim Broadbent – Station Porter
- Richard Griffiths – Studio Engineer
- Janine Duvitski – Jackie
- Michael Kitchen – Larner
- Jonathan Lynn – Radio DJ
- Gary Holton – Punk Guitarist
- Kenneth MacDonald – Security Man

Uncredited extras include

- Rat Scabies - Audition Musician
- Jonathan Ross - Extra
- Marilyn - Marilyn
- Boy George - Punk

== Production ==
Initial finance of £30,000 used for development was provided by Goldcrest Films. The film was originally announced as a Rock Follies feature project. The development costs were reimbursed to Goldcrest when Allied Stars, run by Dodi Fayed, put up the entire budget of $3 million to make it its first film. Goldcrest and Allied Stars would later work together on Chariots of Fire.

Filming started 1 October 1979.
