= Don't Believe Anymore =

1984 single by Icehouse

Single by Icehouse

from the album Sidewalk
- B-side: "Java"
- Released: 15 June 1984
- Recorded: 1984
- Length: 4:15 (7" Aust version); 5:15 (album version plus 7" & 12" Chrysalis releases); 3:40 (video clip)
- Label: Chrysalis; Regular
- Songwriter: Iva Davies
- Producer: Iva Davies

Icehouse singles chronology
"Taking the Town" (1984)	"Don't Believe Anymore" (1984)	"Dusty Pages" (1984)

Music video
- "Don't Believe Anymore" on YouTube

"Don't Believe Anymore" is a single by the Australian rock band Icehouse and written by Iva Davies. It is the second single from their third studio album, Sidewalk. It was released on 15 June 1984 in the UK (7" and 12") and on 2 July 1984 in Australia (7" only). It peaked at No. 31 on the Australian singles chart.The song's saxophone work and solo was provided by musician Joe Camilleri and fretless bass by Guy Pratt. Another version re-mixed by Ivan Gough and Colin Snape appears on the Icehouse album Meltdown released in 2002.

== Charts ==
Chart (1984)	Peak position
Australia (Kent Music Report)	31
New Zealand (Recorded Music NZ)	36

== The Whitlams version ==
"Don't Believe Anymore"

Single by the Whitlams

from the album Torch the Moon
- Released: June 2003
- Recorded: 2002
- Length: 5:26; 3:46 (single edit)
- Label: Black Yak
- Songwriter: Iva Davies

The Whitlams singles chronology
"Royal in the Afternoon" (2003)	"Don't Believe Anymore" (2003)	"Beautiful as You" (2007)

Music video
- "Don't Believe Anymore" on YouTube

Australian indie rock band the Whitlams covered the song and released it in June 2003 as the fourth and final single from their fifth studio album, Torch the Moon (2002). It peaked at number 47 on the Australian ARIA singles chart.

=== Track listing ===
1. "Don't Believe Anymore" (Single Version) – 3:50
2. "Don't Believe Anymore" (Full Version) – 5:26
3. "Je N'y Crois Plus" – 3:48

=== Charts ===
Chart (2003)	Peak position
Australia (ARIA)	47
