= Breaking Glass (album) =

Soundtrack album by Hazel O'Connor
- Released: 1 August 1980
- Recorded: 1980
- Studio: Good Earth Studios, London
- Genre: New wave; alternative rock
- Length: 41:59
- Label: A&M
- Producer: Tony Visconti

Hazel O'Connor chronology
Breaking Glass (1980)	Sons and Lovers (1980)

Singles from Breaking Glass
- 1. "Writing on the Wall" Released: 22 May 1980; 2. "Eighth Day" Released: August 1980; 3. "Give Me an Inch" Released: October 1980; 4. "Will You?" Released: 8 May 1981; 5. "Calls the Tune" Released: January 1982

Professional ratings
Review scores
Source	Rating
AllMusic	2.5/5 stars
Record Mirror	4/5 stars
Smash Hits	3/10 stars

Breaking Glass is the debut album by English singer Hazel O'Connor, released in 1980 by A&M Records. It is the soundtrack album to the film Breaking Glass, featuring songs written and performed by O'Connor who also stars in the film. The album reached number 5 in the UK Albums Chart, remaining on the chart for 38 weeks and was certified Gold by the British Phonographic Industry. Two of the musicians in her band, Bob Carter and Andy Duncan, were members of Linx.

== Singles ==
A total of five singles were released from the album, with the second single "Eighth Day", released in August 1980, becoming O'Connor's most successful, peaking at number 5 on the UK Singles Chart. "Will You?", released in May 1981 was also a Top-Ten hit. By the time the final single, "Calls the Tune" was released in January 1982, O'Connor had released a further two albums, Sons and Lovers and Cover Plus. Despite this, the single managed to chart at number 60 in the UK.

== Reception ==
Reviewing the album for Record Mirror, Simon Ludgate wrote "See the film before you buy this soundtrack and it'll make far more sense. The thing is, see, that on its own this is larger than life. Melodramatic, even." "The tracks are not in the order they crop up in the film and some work on their own, without the added visual stimulus, and some don't. Hazel has a peculiar singing technique which involves gulping air in a lot and opening your mouth as wide as possible. At least it's original... I like it." "The film has some scary overtones which are still here on this album and neither are recommended for the faint-hearted."

Reviewing for Smash Hits, Red Starr described it as an "utterly uninteresting and thoroughly unconvincing soundtrack album. Whatever Ms. O'Connor's true talents, they certainly do not include songwriting (here a relentless series of embarrassing obvious lyrical cliches with no real gift for melody) or singing (bad Lene Lovich impersonations being of distinctly limited appeal)."

== Tour ==
When O'Connor toured the UK to promote the album, she selected as her opening act a then-unknown group called Duran Duran which gave them the exposure to secure a recording contract with EMI. At the time, Duran Duran were so broke that one of their managers had to sell their flat to buy them a support slot on O'Connor's tour. They also could only afford one hotel room, so they took it in turns, whilst the other members slept outside in a van. Due to the differing music styles and fans between O'Connor and Duran Duran, O'Connor said that lead vocalist Simon Le Bon faced "abuse and people spitting on him every night". However, she also said "we could see they were going to do well" in the future.

== Track listing ==
All tracks are written by Hazel O'Connor and published by Albion Music Ltd

Side one
No.	Title	Length
1.	"Writing on the Wall"	3:20
2.	"Monsters in Disguise"	3:22
3.	"Come into the Air"	3:42
4.	"Big Brother"	3:04
5.	"Who Needs It"	3:09
6.	"Will You?"	4:49

Side two
No.	Title	Length
7.	"Eighth Day"	3:11
8.	"Top of the Wheel"	3:15
9.	"Calls the Tune"	3:00
10.	"Blackman"	3:44
11.	"Give Me an Inch"	3:08
12.	"If Only"	4:15
Total length:		41:59

== Personnel ==
Musicians

- Hazel O'Connor – lead vocals, keyboards
- Tony Visconti – vocals, keyboards
- Bob Carter – guitars, keyboards, vocals
- Wesley Magoogan – saxophones
- Rick "Pinky" Ford – bass
- Andy Duncan – drums, percussion

Technical

- Tony Visconti – producer, arrangement, engineer
- Kit Woolven – engineer
- Gordon Fordyce – engineer
- Chuck Beeson – art direction and design
- George Whitear – photography
- Recorded and mixed at Good Earth Studios, London

== Charts ==
Chart (1980–81)	Peak position
Australia (Kent Music Report)	64
Norwegian Albums (VG-lista)	23
Swedish Albums (Sverigetopplistan)	16
UK Albums (OCC)	5
US Bubbling Under the Top LPs (Billboard)	202
