= Ben Roulston =

English producer, mixing engineer and audio engineer

Ben Roulston is an English producer, mixing engineer and audio engineer who has worked with Florence and The Machine, Nas, Wolf Alice, Dia Frampton, The Saturdays, Tricky, The Black Eyed Peas, John Legend, Noel Gallagher, Plan B, Paloma Faith, Marc Almond, Tinchy Stryder, Fun Lovin' Criminals, Foxtrax, Kaleida and many others.

In 2007, in partnership with Jasmin Lee, the daughter of Alvin Lee from Ten Years After, Roulston took over Tony Visconti's Soho-based 'Good Earth Studios' and re-launched it as 'Dean Street Studios' — a premier recording facility spread over 2,500 square feet housing five studios, recreation areas and office spaces.
