= Edward Bell (artist) =

British artist

Edward Bell is a British artist. He worked as a freelance photographer and illustrator for Vogue, Tatler and Elle magazines. He was commissioned for portraits for album covers for David Bowie (Scary Monsters (and Super Creeps) and Tin Machine) and Hazel O'Connor (Sons and Lovers). He has exhibited widely on the London art scene and his work covers many genres from life paintings to bronzes, from pop art to landscapes.

Bell was also the subject of a film by the artist Marcus Thompson, titled Edward.

== Background and education ==
Edward Bell was educated at Haileybury and Imperial Service College and went on to study art at Brighton College of Art (now the Faculty of Arts (University of Brighton)). He took a Graphic design degree at Chelsea School of Art, along with amongst others, the author and designer Roger Kohn; and from there went on to take an MA in photography at the Royal College of Art. According to Bell's own account of his time at the Royal College, he clashed with the head of department and 'refused' the MA he was awarded,

"Studying photography at the Royal proved a disappointment, for them and me. The then head of department would have been more suited to coaching a rugby scrum. I reacted, and on being awarded the MA refused it in disgust. (It turned up months later in the post.)"

Bell worked as a freelance photographer undertaking various iconic art projects including work for Vogue and Tatler, as well as the album cover for David Bowie's Scary Monsters (and Super Creeps) of which he has written:

"This client was dressed in an insipid yellow, short sleeved shirt and bright red trousers, but most damning of all he wore dark glasses to examine the pictures. I was introduced to:

“David”

“David who?”

“David Bowie”

I stood corrected, and to my astonishment we got on together. He wanted an album design within the week. OK no problem. The image for ‘Scary Monsters’ was produced".

After ‘dropping-out’ of the London art scene, and for a while becoming a self-confessed heroin addict Bell took 'time out' in Venice and Florence. His return to the Art World in 2003 was marked by an exhibition in Gallery 286, London, entitled Re-nude. It was closely followed by Pulse, a collection of symbolic abstracts:

“I believe us all to be a combination of black and white hearts and life about crossing out as many black as possible. Here I depict the varied combinations of black white, tranquil, tortured, grey, craven, colourful, Mickey Mouse, monstrous …."

== Recent work ==
Bell's work has tended to be focused in two areas; nudes and landscapes. His recent exhibition of landscapes in oil Stunning Moments at the Arterie Gallery in Ludlow was described by BBC Shropshire in the following terms:

"The speed of painting is one of the most enthralling aspects of the exhibition. Amid the complex abstraction of colour and landscape, there's an engaging simplicity of brush strokes, light and shade. The speed of capture also translates into an energy, even within some of the darkest backdrops, punctuated with their small, almost horizontal flashes of iridescent colour."

Bell's latest exhibition One Sky, Gallery 286 is a series of skyscapes and landscapes, painted 'en plein air' in oil on canvas or board.

== Additional information ==
In 2005, Bell was among the many artists, including Sir Paul McCartney, David Hockney, Tracey Emin and Damien Hirst, who produced a postcard, selected by Bernard Williams of Christie's, for the Art of Care Auction in Edinburgh.

== Exhibitions ==
- One Sky, October 2008, Gallery 286 London
- Emigration, June 2008, Stronach Gallery Co. Galway
- Pulse, 2006, Gallery 286 London
- Re-Nude, 2003, Gallery 286 London
- Original Bowie works 2021, The Dory Gallery Llangollen

== Gallery ==
Landscape in oil, by Edward Bell
