= Man of Colours =

Studio album by Icehouse
- Released: 21 September 1987
- Recorded: February – May 1987
- Studios: EMI Studios 301 (Sydney, Australia); Crescent (Bath, England)
- Genres: Rock; new wave
- Length: 44:36 (AUS 1987 LP); 56:45 (AUS 1987 CD)
- Labels: Regular; Chrysalis
- Producer: David Lord

Icehouse chronology
Measure for Measure (1986)	Man of Colours (1987)	Great Southern Land (1989)

Singles from Man of Colours
- 1. "Crazy" Released: 8 June 1987; 2. "Electric Blue" Released: 31 August 1987; 3. "My Obsession" Released: 23 November 1987; 4. "Man of Colours" Released: 8 February 1988; 5. "Nothing Too Serious" Released: 16 May 1988

Man of Colours
- 1988 Black-sleeve release (Regular Records)

Professional ratings
Review scores
Source	Rating
AllMusic	2/5 stars
Record Mirror	3/5 stars

Man of Colours is the fifth studio album by Australian rock band Icehouse, released locally on 21 September 1987 by Regular Records and Chrysalis Records. The title track was released as the fourth single off the album, making #28 on the Australian Music Report in February 1988, staying on the chart for 13 weeks.

== Cover art ==
The cover artwork, designed by Iva Davies and Robert Kretschmer, depicts a human figure holding three different coloured flowers. An alternate Limited Black Sleeve release depicted the cover art on a reversed background from Regular Records in Australia but had the same track listing.

== Release and reception ==
The album peaked at No. 1 on the Australian album charts for 11 weeks from 5 October 1987 and has sold over 700,000 copies. "Electric Blue" was their only Australian No. 1 single, the release of the album and its five singles marked the zenith of Icehouse's commercial success, both locally and internationally. Several other songs from the album also charted well.

It was the first Australian album to supply five top 30 hit singles "Crazy" (No. 4 in July), "Electric Blue" (co-written by Davies and John Oates of US band Hall & Oates; No. 1, October), "My Obsession" (No. 12, December), "Man of Colours" (No. 28, February 1988) and "Nothing Too Serious" (No. 29, May 1988). With US chart success for "Crazy", which reached No. 14 on the Billboard Hot 100 and No. 10 on its Mainstream Rock chart, and "Electric Blue" (No. 7 Hot 100, No. 10 Mainstream), the album Man of Colours reached No. #43 on the Billboard 200.

The album won the ARIA Award for Album of the Year and ARIA Award for Highest Selling Album at the ARIA Music Awards of 1988; the associated song "Electric Blue" won 'Most Performed Australasian Popular Work' at the Australasian Performing Right Association (APRA) Music Awards for its writers Davies and Oates.

== Reissues ==
Different versions of the album have been released. The initial Australian release by Regular Records (see infobox above right) was as a ten-track vinyl LP or as a music cassette or as a twelve-track CD with two additional mixes of "Crazy". The US / UK release by Chrysalis Records had a different track order from the Australian LP, and the track lengths for the two big singles ("Crazy" and "Electric Blue") are longer on this version of the album. The 1997 Japanese CD version released by For Life Records had two different tracks added. In 2002, Warner Music Australia re-released Man of Colours, with Davies and Ryan Scott digitally remastering, including five bonus tracks. In Australia, the album was also offered on three limited edition coloured vinyl pressings, which were the colours of the flowers that the human figure on the cover was holding.

== Covers ==
Fellow Australian rock band Unitopia recorded the title track, "Man of Colours", on their own album Covered Mirror Vol. 1: Smooth as Silk, a collection of mainly classic progressive rock covers, in 2012. They changed the time signature from 4/4 in the original to 7/8.

== Track listing ==
Songwriters according to Australasian Performing Right Association (APRA).

Australian release
No.	Title	Writer(s)	Length
1.	"Crazy"	Iva Davies, Robert Kretschmer, Andy Qunta	3:24
2.	"Electric Blue"	Davies, John Oates	4:24
3.	"Nothing Too Serious"	Davies	3:28
4.	"Man of Colours"	Davies	5:12
5.	"Heartbreak Kid"	Davies, Kretschmer	5:19
6.	"The Kingdom"	Davies	4:52
7.	"My Obsession"	Davies	4:09
8.	"Girl in the Moon"	Davies, Kretschmer	4:01
9.	"Anybody's War"	Davies	4:05
10.	"Sunrise"	Davies, Kretschmer	5:45

CD version bonus tracks
No.	Title	Length
11.	"Crazy" (12" version)	7:21
12.	"Crazy" (Midnight Mix)	4:48

2002 remaster bonus tracks
No.	Title	Writer(s)	Length
13.	"Shakin' the Cage"	Davies, Kretschmer, Qunta, Simon Lloyd	4:00
14.	"Over My Head"	Davies, Kretschmer, Qunta, Lloyd	3:47
15.	"Touch the Fire"	Davies	3:46
16.	"Jimmy Dean"	Davies, Kretschmer	4:00
17.	"Electric Blue" (Extended Mix)		7:34

US/UK release
No.	Title	Length
1.	"Crazy"	4:48
2.	"Electric Blue"	4:38
3.	"My Obsession"	4:07
4.	"Man of Colours"	5:09
5.	"Heartbreak Kid"	5:18
6.	"The Kingdom"	4:51
7.	"Nothing Too Serious"	3:25
8.	"Girl in the Moon"	4:00
9.	"Anybody's War"	4:05
10.	"Sunrise"	5:44

CD bonus tracks
No.	Title	Length
11.	"Crazy" (12" mix)	7:22
12.	"Crazy" (Midnight Mix)	4:49

Japanese release
No.	Title	Length
1.	"Crazy"
2.	"Electric Blue"
3.	"Nothing Too Serious"
4.	"Man of Colours"
5.	"Heartbreak Kid"
6.	"The Kingdom"
7.	"My Obsession"
8.	"Girl in the Moon"
9.	"Anybody's War"
10.	"Sunrise"

1997 remixes
No.	Title	Length
11.	"Man of Colours" (6 am Mix)
12.	"Shakin' the Cage" (D. Lord Mix)

== Personnel ==
Icehouse members

- Iva Davies – vocals, guitars, keyboards, Fairlight CMI, cor anglais
- Robert Kretschmer – guitars
- Simon Lloyd – reeds, brass, keyboards, programming
- Stephen Morgan – bass guitar
- Andy Qunta – keyboards, piano, backing vocals
- Paul Wheeler – drums, percussion

Additional musicians

- Andy Cichon – bass guitar
- Stuart Gordon – strings
- David Lord – additional keyboards
- Glenn Tommey – guitar, percussion
- John Oates – backing vocals on "Electric Blue"
- Shena Power – backing vocals
- Tommy Dassolo – triangle
- Karl Chandler – tuba

Recording details

- Producer – David Lord
- Engineer – David Hemming, David Wright
  - Assistants – Carrie Motzing, Greg Henderson
- Studio – EMI Studios 301 and Trash Studios, Sydney, Australia and Crescent Studios, Bath, Somerset
- Mixer – David Lord, assisted by Raine Shine @ Crescent Studios, except:
  - "Crazy", mixed by David Lord, assisted by David Hemming @ E.M.I. Studios 301, Sydney
  - "Man of Colours" mixed by Iva Davies, assisted by David Hemming @ Albert Studios, Sydney
  - "Electric Blue" and "My Obsession" mixed by Michael Brauer @ Sigma Sound Studios, New York City, United States
- Mastering: Don Bartley, assisted by David Hemming @ E.M.I. Studios, Sydney
- Digital remastering (2002) – Iva Davies, Ryan Scott

Art work

- Artwork – Iva Davies, Robert Kretschmer
- Art direction and layout – Sue Goff
- Photography – Hugh Stewart

== Charts ==
=== Weekly charts ===
Chart (1987–1988)	Peak position
Australian Albums (Kent Music Report)	1
Dutch Albums (Album Top 100)	41
New Zealand Albums (RMNZ)	1
UK Albums (Official Charts)	93
US Billboard 200	43
Canada Top Albums/CDs (RPM)	52

=== Year-end charts ===
Chart (1987)	Position
Australian Albums (Kent Music Report)	18
New Zealand Albums (RMNZ)	33

== Certifications and sales ==
Region	Certification	Certified units/sales
Australia (ARIA)	7× Platinum	490,000^{^}
Canada (Music Canada)	Gold	50,000^{^}
New Zealand (RMNZ)	Platinum	15,000^{^}
^{^} Shipments figures based on certification alone.
