= Eighth Day (Hazel O'Connor song) =

1980 single by Hazel O'Connor

Single by Hazel O'Connor

from the album Breaking Glass
- B-side: "Monsters in Disguise"
- Released: August 1980
- Recorded: 1980
- Studio: Good Earth Studios, London
- Genre: New wave; pop rock
- Length: 3:11
- Label: A&M
- Songwriter(s): Hazel O'Connor
- Producer(s): Tony Visconti

Hazel O'Connor singles chronology
"Writing on the Wall" (1980)	"Eighth Day" (1980)	"Give Me an Inch" (1980)

Audio
- "Eighth Day" on YouTube

"Eighth Day" is a song by British singer-songwriter Hazel O'Connor, released in August 1980 as the second single from her debut and soundtrack album, Breaking Glass. It reached no. 5 on the UK Singles Charts, making it her first top-ten hit and her highest chart placing to date. The song was also certified silver in the UK by the BPI.

O'Connor wrote the song twelve hours before it was recorded as a parallel story of the Book of Genesis where Man made the Earth in his own image, and "having unleashed elements he cannot control, the Man-made Machine Monster takes over".

== Reception ==
Writing in Record Mirror, Simon Ludgate described the song as "the worst track from the album" with its release "something to do with a strong visual appeal because of the accompanying film clip". He said it "sounds like a latter-day 'Messiah'" and that "Monsters in Disguise" should have been released as a single instead. However, in the same magazine issue, reviewer Gill Pringle said "I'm impressed. Because I'm enjoying this record so much, I've suppressed the cringe that keeps welling up inside of me, everytime I think too hard about the modernistic touch of this record."

== Charts ==
Chart (1980)	Peak position
Australia (Kent Music Report)	78
Ireland (IRMA)	7
UK Singles (OCC)	5
