= Andy Qunta =

English musical artist (born 1951)

- Born: Anderson Amos Temba Qunta; 9 January 1951 (age 75); Warrington, Cheshire, England
- Genres: Rock; pop rock
- Occupations: Singer; songwriter; composer; musician
- Instruments: Keyboards; piano; guitar; vocals
- Years active: 1970–present
- Labels: Rondor Music; PolyGram
- Member of: Factory
- Formerly of: Icehouse
- Website: andyqunta.com

Anderson Amos Temba "Andy" Qunta (born 9 January 1951) is an English singer, songwriter, composer and musician. In a career spanning more than 40 years, Qunta is best known as the keyboardist of the Australian rock band Icehouse from between 1982 and 1988. As a popular musician, he has been influenced by artists including the Who, Cliff Richard, Jimi Hendrix, Genesis, Manfred Mann, Yes, Todd Rundgren and Queen. In a nine months period over 1986–1987 two co-written songs by Qunta ("You're the Voice" by John Farnham and "Crazy" by Icehouse) reached the Australian top 5 singles chart.

== Early years ==
Anderson Amos Temba Qunta was born on 9 January 1951, in Warrington, Cheshire. His father was South African and his mother English. Beginning at the age of six, he studied classical piano and violin, but later developed an interest in popular music and picked up guitar, bass guitar, harmonica, and drums.

== Music career ==
In 1970, Andy and his brother Tony formed the band Factory in Hastings, East Sussex, England. Andy played twelve-string guitar, Tony played lead guitar and electric violin, Laurie Cooksey played drums, Jaffa Peckham played bass guitar until 1974 being replaced with Steve Kinch. All members contributed to vocals, and the band played to consistently good critical reviews. The original members of Factory re-formed in 2014, and their debut studio album Back in the Time Machine was released in April 2016.

From 1979, Qunta worked as a session musician and toured with various bands, beginning with Hazel O'Connor's Megahype. In 1981, he played on the single "I Can't Even Touch You" by Steve Harley & Cockney Rebel. In 1982, Manfred Mann's Earth Band recorded Qunta's song "Tribal Statistics" for their eleventh studio album Somewhere in Afrika. This recording was also released as a single, but it failed to chart.

At the end of 1982, Qunta moved to Australia to join the band Icehouse. Their 1983 single "Hey Little Girl" reached the Top 10 in the UK and Europe. In 1984, Icehouse released their third studio album Sidewalk, which featured the hit "Don't Believe Anymore", and toured Australia, New Zealand, UK, Japan and Europe to support the release. Icehouse continued with a succession of hits, including the singles "Great Southern Land", "Crazy", "Electric Blue", and "My Obsession". Their best selling albums included Primitive Man (1982), and Man of Colours (1987). The band was inducted into the Australian Recording Industry Association (ARIA) Hall of Fame on 16 August 2006.

Along with the success of "Crazy", in 1987 Qunta co-wrote "You're the Voice" which was released by John Farnham as the first single from his twelfth studio album Whispering Jack (1986). The song reached the number-one chart position. This gave Qunta the confidence to write and record his debut and sole solo studio album Legend in a Loungeroom in 1989. Afterward he left Icehouse, and relocated to Los Angeles, California.

== Songwriting career ==
In 1985, Qunta signed a worldwide publishing contract with Rondor Music to market his songs, but in 1992 he switched to PolyGram in Los Angeles, California.

In 1986, Qunta and Iva Davies co-wrote the Icehouse single "Crazy", he also co-wrote "You're the Voice" for John Farnham in the same year. In 2000, he wrote the score for the film Last Chance and in 2006 collaborated with Anthony Di Pietro on a stage musical adaptation of Rudyard Kipling's short story "The Man Who Would Be King" (1888).

== Personal life ==
Qunta married the songwriter Jane Wareing in 1997 and they have a daughter named Alex. The couple divorced in 2001. He currently lives near Los Angeles, California, with his current wife, the photographer Teresa Qunta (née Jones) whom he married in 2005.

== Discography ==
Qunta has a long list of credits, and in 1989 released his debut and sole solo studio album.

Studio album

- Legend in a Loungeroom (1989)
