= Hazel O'Connor =

English singer-songwriter and actress (born 1954)

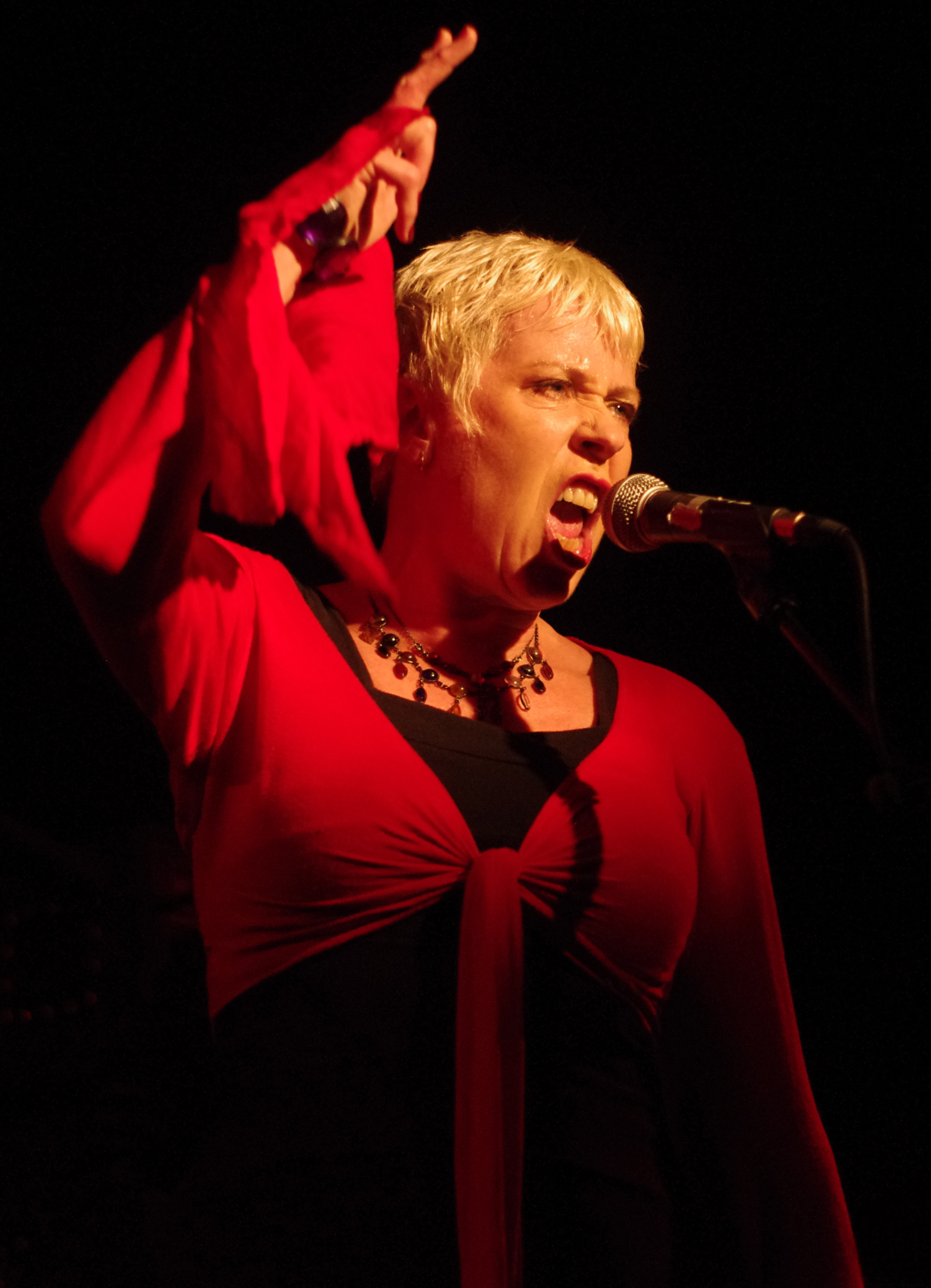
- O'Connor in 2010

Background information
- Born: Hazel Thereasa O'Connor; 16 May 1954 (age 72); Coventry, England
- Genres: New wave; alternative; pop; folk; new-age
- Occupations: Singer-songwriter; actress
- Instrument: Vocals
- Years active: 1975–present

Hazel Thereasa O'Connor (born 16 May 1954) is an English singer-songwriter and actress. She became famous in the early 1980s with hit singles "Eighth Day", "D-Days" and "Will You?" She also starred in the 1980 film Breaking Glass.

== Early life ==
Hazel Thereasa O'Connor was born on 16 May 1954 in Coventry, England. She is the daughter of a soldier from County Galway in Ireland who moved to England after the Second World War to work in a car plant. Her English mother worked as a hotel receptionist. Her older brother Neil later fronted the punk band The Flys, best known for their single "Love and a Molotov Cocktail", which she later covered. O'Connor would spend summers in the West of Ireland until her parents separated when she was eight years old.

== Career ==
Her film debut was in Girls Come First in 1975, where she was credited as Hazel Glyn. She became prominent as an actress and singer five years later in 1980 when playing the role of Kate in the film Breaking Glass. She also performed on the accompanying soundtrack.

I ran away from my home in Coventry when I was 16, ... made and sold clothes in Amsterdam, picked grapes in France, joined a dance troupe that went to Tokyo then onto Beirut (escaping the start of the civil war by one month!) travelled West Africa, crossed the Sahara, sang with a dreadful singing trio for the U.S. troops in Germany and came home to "settle down". Through all this experience of life and the world I realised that singing always cheered me up. I decided to be a singer. Through strange turns of fate I ended up in a film called 'Breaking Glass' I also ended up writing all the songs for the movie.

— Hazel O'Connor, introduction note of the program for a gig at "At My Place" in Santa Monica, California, 1989

Her performance as Kate won her the Variety Club of Great Britain Award for 'Best Film Actress'. She was also nominated for the BAFTA Award for Best Film Music. The film's soundtrack album featured songs written and performed by O'Connor and reached number 5 in the UK Albums Chart. It had a 38-week chart run and was certified Gold by the British Phonographic Industry. Several tracks from the album were released as singles, the most successful being "Eighth Day" and "Will You" (with a notable saxophone solo by Wesley Magoogan) which both reached the UK Top 10. When O'Connor toured the UK to promote the album, the opening act were a then-unknown group called Duran Duran. It was the band's first opportunity to play to large audiences throughout the UK and gave them the exposure they needed to secure a recording contract.

Subsequent albums released by O'Connor included Sons and Lovers (which featured the UK Top 10 hit single "D-Days"), Cover Plus, Smile, Private Wars and Five in the Morning. O'Connor also collaborated with other artists, and made appearances in the video for Mick Karn's "The Sound Of Waves" and a cameo appearance in the 1983 Eurythmics video "Who's That Girl?".

She has made numerous television appearances, starring in Jangles on British television and in 1986 playing the lead role of Vivienne in Fighting Back as well as singing the theme tune. She also played a singer in an episode of Prospects on Channel 4 in 1986 alongside former Breaking Glass co-star Gary Olsen, resulting in the release of a spin-off single "Today Could Be So Good".

Her theatre work included One Flew Over the Cuckoo's Nest at the Royal Exchange, Manchester, Nightshoot at the Tricycle Theatre, London, Girlfriends at the Playhouse, London (1987), Swing Out Sister, her own production, at the Riverside Studio, London, The Raven Beckons at the Riverbank Theatre, Dublin and The Cuchulain Cycle at the Riverside Studio, London.

In 1997 she recorded the studio album Five in the Morning with record producer, co-writer and guitarist, Gerard Kiely. The album included the song "Na Na Na". A live album, Live in Berlin, followed.

The turn of the century saw O'Connor tell her life story in a touring show entitled Beyond Breaking Glass, with harpist Cormac de Barra. The show was a hit at the Edinburgh Festival Fringe in 1998 and toured Ireland and the UK, the Netherlands (twice), Australia and Canada.

She signed to Invisible Hands Music in 2002; this triggered a run of new releases and of deluxe re-issues of her 1990s work. A commercially available reincarnation of the previously mail-order Beyond the Breaking Glass was followed by a previously unreleased acoustic concert, Acoustically Yours.

In 2003, Invisible Hands Music released O'Connor's first 'best of' compilation, A Singular Collection, which brought together her early hits from the Albion days, mid career work at RCA, and the best of the latter, DIY era. To add something new to the best of compilation, O'Connor recorded a cover of her friend George Michael's hit "One More Try", with a band that included drummer Carlos Hercules, who at the time was playing for Annie Lennox and Beverley Knight. Hercules joined George Michael's band in 2006. The track was released as a single, and generated extensive airplay and renewed interest in O'Connor—the following year saw her perform at the Glastonbury Festival.

Hidden Heart, produced by Martin Rushent and including duets with Maire Brennan and Rob Reynolds, was released in the UK in 2006, and her 1984 album Smile was reissued on CD in 2008.

In 2008, O'Connor performed for the second time at the Glastonbury Festival, playing an acoustic set on the Avalon stage.

In 2009, O'Connor performed as part of the '1980s Here and Now' tour at many venues including Wembley Arena. She continued to tour extensively with her own solo projects, 'Beyond the Breaking Glass' and 'Bluja Project'. In 2009 she was awarded her own star on Coventry's 'Walk of Fame'.

In September 2010, O'Connor performed in France with The Bluja Project featuring Clare Hirst and Sarah Fisher, and in Ireland in October with Cormac de Barra. She then performed 'Breaking Glass Live' throughout England, culminating in a show at the Leicester Square Theatre in London on 5 December 2010.

== Activism ==
O'Connor donated her songwriting talents to Greenpeace First International Record Project released worldwide in 1985 as a response to the French bombing and subsequent sinking of the Rainbow Warrior. Her duet song "Push and Shove" with Chris Thompson leads off the second act of the album and accompanying video.

== Personal life ==
O'Connor married artist Kurt Bippert in 1987. The ceremony took place on Venice Beach, California. It received coverage by Hello! magazine. The actor David Rappaport was best man, and Dave Wakeling from The Beat gave O'Connor away. She had previously dated Hugh Cornwell and Midge Ure. Bippert and O'Connor divorced in 2000.

For a time she was interested in becoming a member of the International Society for Krishna Consciousness, commonly known as the Hare Krishna movement, and starred in a 60-minute film about her relationship with the Krishnas titled Persuaders which was broadcast by the BBC in December 1985. O'Connor is a vegetarian.

O'Connor currently divides her time between Ireland and France. She is friends with BBC Radio London host JoAnne Good and singer Toyah Willcox, whom she narrowly beat for the lead role in Breaking Glass.

On 17 January 2022, O'Connor's brother Neil published a statement on her website, saying she was currently recovering from "a serious medical event" on 9 January 2022 at her house in France. She had been taken to hospital where it was determined that she had suffered a brain haemorrhage and was put into an induced coma for 24 hours.

== Filmography ==
Year	Film	Role	Notes
1975	Girls Come First	Claire	Sex comedy short by Joseph McGrath
1977	Double Exposure	Shirley	Thriller by William Webb
1980	Breaking Glass	Kate	Drama Musical by Brian Gibson - Official Film Trailer
1982	Jangles	Joanne	TV mini series (7 episodes) by HTV West
1983	"Who's That Girl?"	Herself	Music video (Eurythmics)
1986	Prospects	Bev Reid	TV series (Episode 10 - Follow the Yellow Brick Lane) by Euston Films - Official Series Trailer
1986	Car Trouble	Maureen	Comedy by David Green
1986	Fighting Back	Viv Sharpe	TV mini series (5 episodes) by British Broadcasting Corporation (BBC)
1990	Alive and Kicking in L.A.	Herself	Documentary
2005	Hazel O'Connor Live in Brighton	Herself	Live DVD including interview
2008	Beyond The Breaking Glass	Herself	A limited release documenting O'Connor's life story in the style of her stage show Beyond The Breaking Glass
2019	Baghdad In My Shadow	Kate	Thriller by Samir - Official Film Trailer - Preview of Kate Forever performing Wakey Wakey

== Books ==
- Breaking Glass Barefoot – The Autobiography (2012)
