= Dean Street Studios =

Commercial recording studio in England

Coordinates: 51.51274°N 0.13198°W

Dean Street Studios is a commercial recording studio located at 59 Dean Street, Soho, London, England.

== History ==
The premises are first known to have been used as a film studio in the 1950s, which then became Zodiac Studios.

In 1977, producer Tony Visconti bought the studios, which he renamed Good Earth Studios, with Paul Cartledge taking the role of studio manager. Visconti owned the studio for 13 years, recording and producing acts such as T. Rex, David Bowie, Phil Lynott and Thin Lizzy at Good Earth.

In 1989, Joe & Co bought the lease and expanded into the rest of the basement, by building a few more music recording/production suites.

In 2007 Jasmin Lee, the daughter of Alvin Lee from Ten Years After, took over the business and re-launched it as Dean Street Studios, in partnership with the studio head engineer and director Ben Roulston. She has since then been managing it successfully and has seen many well-established, as well as up-and-coming, artists come back to work at Dean Street regularly because of the studio's central location. These artists include Marc Almond, Paul Weller, Florence and the Machine, Ed Sheeran, Tom Odell and many others. Lee also went on to establish Dean St Live, a production company for various events in the UK and around Europe.

Apart from Dean Street Studios, the premises are also home to a production company, Yellow Boat Music; an audio post-production company, Guilt Free; and independent producers Charlie Russell, Bradley Spence and Alex Beitzke. Collectively, they occupy all the other four, smaller production suites that are let on a long-term basis.

== Artists ==
Artists who have more recently worked at Dean Street Studios:

- Adele
- Alfie Boe
- Cee Lo Green
- Courtney Hadwin
- Duran Duran
- Ed Sheeran
- Fightmilk
- Florence and the Machine
- James Arthur
- JLS
- John Legend
- Kaiser Chiefs
- KSI
- Kelly Rowland
- Miles Kane
- Noel Gallagher
- O'Hooley & Tidow
- Paloma Faith
- Paul Epworth
- Paul Weller
- Plan B
- Robert Plant
- The Fades
- The Wanted
- The Weeknd
- Tom Odell
- Wolf Alice
