= List of number-one singles in Australia during the 1970s =

Australian number-one singles of the 1970s < 1960s 1980s >

Australian top 25 singles
- 1970 1971 1972 1973 1974; 1975 1976 1977 1978 1979

Australian top 25 albums
- 1970 1971 1972 1973 1974; 1975 1976 1977 1978 1979

The following lists the number one singles on the Australian Singles Chart during the 1970s. The source for this decade is the "Kent Music Report".

Key
The yellow background indicates the #1 song on the KMR End of Year Chart
The light blue background indicates the #1 song on the KMR End of Decade Chart

== 1970 ==
Date	Artist	Single	Weeks at number one
5 January	Elvis Presley	"Suspicious Minds"	3 weeks (1 week in Dec. 1969)
12 January	Elvis Presley	"Suspicious Minds"	3 weeks (1 week in Dec. 1969)
19 January	Johnny Farnham	"Raindrops Keep Fallin' on My Head"	7 weeks
26 January	Johnny Farnham	"Raindrops Keep Fallin' on My Head"	7 weeks
2 February	Johnny Farnham	"Raindrops Keep Fallin' on My Head"	7 weeks
9 February	Johnny Farnham	"Raindrops Keep Fallin' on My Head"	7 weeks
16 February	Johnny Farnham	"Raindrops Keep Fallin' on My Head"	7 weeks
23 February	Johnny Farnham	"Raindrops Keep Fallin' on My Head"	7 weeks
2 March	Johnny Farnham	"Raindrops Keep Fallin' on My Head"	7 weeks
9 March	Shocking Blue	"Venus"	2 weeks
16 March	Shocking Blue	"Venus"	2 weeks
23 March	Led Zeppelin	"Whole Lotta Love"	2 weeks
30 March	Led Zeppelin	"Whole Lotta Love"	2 weeks
6 April	The Beatles	"Let It Be"	6 weeks
13 April	The Beatles	"Let It Be"	6 weeks
20 April	The Beatles	"Let It Be"	6 weeks
27 April	The Beatles	"Let It Be"	6 weeks
4 May	The Beatles	"Let It Be"	6 weeks
11 May	The Beatles	"Let It Be"	6 weeks
18 May	Norman Greenbaum	"Spirit in the Sky"	5 weeks
25 May	Norman Greenbaum	"Spirit in the Sky"	5 weeks
1 June	Norman Greenbaum	"Spirit in the Sky"	5 weeks
8 June	Norman Greenbaum	"Spirit in the Sky"	5 weeks
15 June	Norman Greenbaum	"Spirit in the Sky"	5 weeks
22 June	Ray Stevens	"Everything Is Beautiful"	2 weeks
29 June	Ray Stevens	"Everything Is Beautiful"	2 weeks
6 July	The Beach Boys	"Cottonfields"	1 week
13 July	Creedence Clearwater Revival	"Up Around the Bend" / "Run Through the Jungle"	6 weeks
20 July	Creedence Clearwater Revival	"Up Around the Bend" / "Run Through the Jungle"	6 weeks
27 July	Creedence Clearwater Revival	"Up Around the Bend" / "Run Through the Jungle"	6 weeks
3 August	Creedence Clearwater Revival	"Up Around the Bend" / "Run Through the Jungle"	6 weeks
10 August	Creedence Clearwater Revival	"Up Around the Bend" / "Run Through the Jungle"	6 weeks
17 August	Creedence Clearwater Revival	"Up Around the Bend" / "Run Through the Jungle"	6 weeks
24 August	Simon & Garfunkel	"El Condor Pasa (If I Could)"	1 week
31 August	Mungo Jerry	"In the Summertime"	1 week
7 September	The Mixtures	"In the Summertime" (cover version)	6 weeks
14 September	The Mixtures	"In the Summertime" (cover version)	6 weeks
21 September	The Mixtures	"In the Summertime" (cover version)	6 weeks
28 September	The Mixtures	"In the Summertime" (cover version)	6 weeks
5 October	The Mixtures	"In the Summertime" (cover version)	6 weeks
12 October	The Mixtures	"In the Summertime" (cover version)	6 weeks
19 October	The Carpenters	"(They Long to Be) Close to You"	3 weeks
26 October	The Carpenters	"(They Long to Be) Close to You"	3 weeks
2 November	The Carpenters	"(They Long to Be) Close to You"	3 weeks
9 November	Creedence Clearwater Revival	"Lookin' Out My Back Door" / "Long as I Can See the Light"	4 weeks
16 November	Creedence Clearwater Revival	"Lookin' Out My Back Door" / "Long as I Can See the Light"	4 weeks
23 November	Creedence Clearwater Revival	"Lookin' Out My Back Door" / "Long as I Can See the Light"	4 weeks
30 November	Creedence Clearwater Revival	"Lookin' Out My Back Door" / "Long as I Can See the Light"	4 weeks
7 December	Miguel Ríos	"A Song of Joy"	4 weeks
14 December	Miguel Ríos	"A Song of Joy"	4 weeks
21 December	Miguel Ríos	"A Song of Joy"	4 weeks
28 December	Miguel Ríos	"A Song of Joy"	4 weeks

Other hits
Songs peaking at number two included "Fortunate Son" / "Down on the Corner" by Creedence Clearwater Revival, "Smiley" by Ronnie Burns, "I Thank You" by Lionel Rose, "Love Grows (Where My Rosemary Goes)" by Edison Lighthouse, "Bridge Over Troubled Water" by Simon and Garfunkel, "Knock, Knock Who's There?" by Liv Maessen, "Lay Down (Candles in the Rain)" by Melanie, "Spill the Wine" by Eric Burdon & War, "Cracklin' Rosie" by Neil Diamond, and "It's Only Make Believe" by Glen Campbell.

Other hits (with their peak positions noted) were "Holly Holy" by Neil Diamond (3), "Don't Cry Daddy" / "Rubberneckin'" by Elvis Presley (3), "Ma Belle Amie" by Tee-Set (3), "All I Have to Do Is Dream" by Bobbie Gentry and Glen Campbell (3), "Tennessee Bird Walk" by Jack Blanchard & Misty Morgan (3), "The Wonder of You" by Elvis Presley (3), "What Have They Done to My Song Ma?" by The New Seekers (3), "Airport Love Theme" by Vincent Bell (4), "Old Man Emu" by John Williamson (4), "Knock, Knock Who's There?" by Mary Hopkin (5).

Hits by Australasian artists included "Two Little Boys" by Rolf Harris, "A Little Ray of Sunshine" by Axiom, "Snowbird" by Liv Maessen and "Comic Conservation" by Johnny Farnham.

== 1971 ==
Date	Artist	Single	Weeks at number one
4 January	The Partridge Family	"I Think I Love You"	2 weeks
11 January	The Partridge Family	"I Think I Love You"	2 weeks
18 January	George Harrison	"My Sweet Lord"	8 weeks
25 January	George Harrison	"My Sweet Lord"	8 weeks
1 February	George Harrison	"My Sweet Lord"	8 weeks
8 February	George Harrison	"My Sweet Lord"	8 weeks
15 February	George Harrison	"My Sweet Lord"	8 weeks
22 February	George Harrison	"My Sweet Lord"	8 weeks
1 March	George Harrison	"My Sweet Lord"	8 weeks
8 March	George Harrison	"My Sweet Lord"	8 weeks
15 March	The Mixtures	"The Pushbike Song"	2 weeks
22 March	The Mixtures	"The Pushbike Song"	2 weeks
29 March	Dawn	"Knock Three Times"	1 week
5 April	Lynn Anderson	"Rose Garden"	4 weeks
12 April	Lynn Anderson	"Rose Garden"	4 weeks
19 April	Lynn Anderson	"Rose Garden"	4 weeks
26 April	Lynn Anderson	"Rose Garden"	4 weeks
3 May	Janis Joplin	"Me and Bobby McGee"	2 weeks
10 May	Janis Joplin	"Me and Bobby McGee"	2 weeks
17 May	Tom Jones	"She's a Lady"	2 weeks
24 May	Tom Jones	"She's a Lady"	2 weeks
31 May	Paul McCartney	"Another Day"	1 week
7 June	Lally Stott	"Chirpy Chirpy Cheep Cheep"	1 week
14 June	The Hollies	"Too Young to Be Married"	2 weeks
21 June	The Hollies	"Too Young to Be Married"	2 weeks
28 June	Daddy Cool	"Eagle Rock"	10 weeks
5 July	Daddy Cool	"Eagle Rock"	10 weeks
12 July	Daddy Cool	"Eagle Rock"	10 weeks
19 July	Daddy Cool	"Eagle Rock"	10 weeks
26 July	Daddy Cool	"Eagle Rock"	10 weeks
2 August	Daddy Cool	"Eagle Rock"	10 weeks
9 August	Daddy Cool	"Eagle Rock"	10 weeks
16 August	Daddy Cool	"Eagle Rock"	10 weeks
23 August	Daddy Cool	"Eagle Rock"	10 weeks
30 August	Daddy Cool	"Eagle Rock"	10 weeks
6 September	Drummond	"Daddy Cool"	7 weeks
13 September	Drummond	"Daddy Cool"	7 weeks
20 September	Drummond	"Daddy Cool"	7 weeks
27 September	Drummond	"Daddy Cool"	7 weeks
4 October	Drummond	"Daddy Cool"	7 weeks
11 October	Drummond	"Daddy Cool"	7 weeks
18 October	Drummond	"Daddy Cool"	7 weeks
25 October	Olivia Newton-John	"Banks of the Ohio"	5 weeks
1 November	Olivia Newton-John	"Banks of the Ohio"	5 weeks
8 November	Olivia Newton-John	"Banks of the Ohio"	5 weeks
15 November	Olivia Newton-John	"Banks of the Ohio"	5 weeks
22 November	Olivia Newton-John	"Banks of the Ohio"	5 weeks
29 November	Rod Stewart	"Maggie May"	4 weeks
6 December	Rod Stewart	"Maggie May"	4 weeks
13 December	Rod Stewart	"Maggie May"	4 weeks
20 December	Rod Stewart	"Maggie May"	4 weeks
27 December	John Lennon	"Imagine"	5 weeks

Other hits
Songs peaking at number two included "Chirpy Chirpy Cheep Cheep" by Middle of the Road, "Symphony No. 40 (Mozart)" by Waldo de los Ríos, "I Don't Know How to Love Him" by Helen Reddy, "L.A. International Airport" by Susan Raye, and "Love is A Beautiful Song" by Dave Mills.

Other hits (with their peak positions noted) were "What is Life" / "Apple Scruffs" by George Harrison (3), "It Don't Come Easy" by Ringo Starr (3), "How Can You Mend a Broken Heart" by Bee Gees (3), "I Did What I Did for Maria" by Tony Christie (3), "Mamy Blue" by Joël Daydé (3), "Lola" by The Kinks (4), "I Hear You Knocking" by Dave Edmunds (4), "Brown Sugar" by The Rolling Stones (5), and "It's Too Late" / "I Feel the Earth Move" by Carole King (6).

Hits by Australasian artists included "Eleanor Rigby" by Zoot, "Come Back Again" by Daddy Cool, "Sweet, Sweet Love" by Russell Morris, "Speak to the Sky" by Rick Springfield, "Falling in Love Again" by Ted Mulry, and "Seasons of Change" by Blackfeather.

== 1972 ==
Date	Artist	Single	Weeks at number one
3 January	John Lennon	"Imagine"	5 weeks
10 January	John Lennon	"Imagine"	5 weeks
17 January	John Lennon	"Imagine"	5 weeks
24 January	John Lennon	"Imagine"	5 weeks
31 January	David Cassidy	"Cherish"	2 weeks
7 February	David Cassidy	"Cherish"	2 weeks
14 February	Benny Hill	"Ernie (The Fastest Milkman in the West)"	2 weeks
21 February	Benny Hill	"Ernie (The Fastest Milkman in the West)"	2 weeks
28 February	Melanie	"Brand New Key"	1 week
6 March	Don McLean	"American Pie"	5 weeks
13 March	Don McLean	"American Pie"	5 weeks
19 March	Don McLean	"American Pie"	5 weeks
27 March	Don McLean	"American Pie"	5 weeks
3 April	Don McLean	"American Pie"	5 weeks
10 April	Nilsson	"Without You"	5 weeks
17 April	Nilsson	"Without You"	5 weeks
24 April	Nilsson	"Without You"	5 weeks
1 May	Nilsson	"Without You"	5 weeks
8 May	Nilsson	"Without You"	5 weeks
15 May	Royal Scots Dragoon Guards	"Amazing Grace"	5 weeks
22 May	Royal Scots Dragoon Guards	"Amazing Grace"	5 weeks
29 May	Royal Scots Dragoon Guards	"Amazing Grace"	5 weeks
5 June	Royal Scots Dragoon Guards	"Amazing Grace"	5 weeks
12 June	Royal Scots Dragoon Guards	"Amazing Grace"	5 weeks
19 June	Roberta Flack	"The First Time Ever I Saw Your Face"	2 weeks
26 June	Roberta Flack	"The First Time Ever I Saw Your Face"	2 weeks
3 July	Dr. Hook & the Medicine Show	"Sylvia's Mother"	3 weeks
10 July	Dr. Hook & the Medicine Show	"Sylvia's Mother"	3 weeks
17 July	Dr. Hook & the Medicine Show	"Sylvia's Mother"	3 weeks
24 July	Donny Osmond	"Puppy Love"	6 weeks
31 July	Donny Osmond	"Puppy Love"	6 weeks
7 August	Donny Osmond	"Puppy Love"	6 weeks
14 August	Donny Osmond	"Puppy Love"	6 weeks
21 August	Donny Osmond	"Puppy Love"	6 weeks
28 August	Donny Osmond	"Puppy Love"	6 weeks
4 September	Wayne Newton	"Daddy Don't You Walk So Fast"	3 weeks
11 September	Wayne Newton	"Daddy Don't You Walk So Fast"	3 weeks
18 September	Wayne Newton	"Daddy Don't You Walk So Fast"	3 weeks
25 September	Gary Glitter	"Rock and Roll, Part 2"	1 week
2 October	Blackfeather	"Boppin' the Blues"	2 weeks
9 October	Blackfeather	"Boppin' the Blues"	2 weeks
16 October	Hot Butter	"Popcorn"	8 weeks
23 October	Hot Butter	"Popcorn"	8 weeks
30 October	Hot Butter	"Popcorn"	8 weeks
6 November	Hot Butter	"Popcorn"	8 weeks
13 November	Hot Butter	"Popcorn"	8 weeks
20 November	Hot Butter	"Popcorn"	8 weeks
27 November	Hot Butter	"Popcorn"	8 weeks
4 December	Hot Butter	"Popcorn"	8 weeks
11 December	Michael Jackson	"Ben"	8 weeks
18 December	Michael Jackson	"Ben"	8 weeks
25 December	Michael Jackson	"Ben"	8 weeks

Other hits
Songs peaking at number two included "Day by Day" by Colleen Hewett, "The Ranger Waltz" by The Mom and Dads, "Most People That I Know" by Billy Thorpe and the Aztecs, "A Horse with No Name" by America, "Alone Again (Naturally)" by Gilbert O'Sullivan, "Long Haired Lover From Liverpool" by Little Jimmy Osmond, "Long Cool Woman in a Black Dress" by The Hollies, "Baby Don't Get Hooked on Me" by Mac Davis, and "You're a Lady" by Peter Skellern.

Other hits (with their peak positions noted) were "My World" / "On Time" by Bee Gees (3), "Joy" by Apollo 100 (3), "Vincent" / "Castles in the Air" by Don McLean (3), "The Candy Man" by Sammy Davis Jr. (3), "Run to Me" by Bee Gees (3), "Breaking Up Is Hard to Do" by The Partridge Family (3), "Burning Love" by Elvis Presley (3), "Morning Has Broken" by Cat Stevens (4), "Hurting Each Other" by The Carpenters (4), "Gypsys, Tramps & Thieves" by Cher (5), "Uncle Albert/Admiral Halsey" by Paul and Linda McCartney (5), and "The Redback on the Toilet Seat" by Slim Newton (5).

Hits by Australasian artists included "Pasadena" by John Paul Young, "Captain Zero" by The Mixtures, "So Tough" by Johnny O'Keefe, "Live with Friends" by Russell Morris, and "Superman" / "Take Me Back" by Alison McCallum.

== 1973 ==
Date	Artist	Single	Weeks at number one
1 January	Michael Jackson	"Ben"	8 weeks
8 January	Michael Jackson	"Ben"	8 weeks
15 January	Michael Jackson	"Ben"	8 weeks
22 January	Michael Jackson	"Ben"	8 weeks
29 January	Michael Jackson	"Ben"	8 weeks
5 February	Lobo	"I'd Love You to Want Me"	2 weeks
12 February	Lobo	"I'd Love You to Want Me"	2 weeks
19 February	Carly Simon	"You're So Vain"	7 weeks
26 February	Carly Simon	"You're So Vain"	7 weeks
5 March	Carly Simon	"You're So Vain"	7 weeks
12 March	Carly Simon	"You're So Vain"	7 weeks
19 March	Carly Simon	"You're So Vain"	7 weeks
26 March	Carly Simon	"You're So Vain"	7 weeks
2 April	Carly Simon	"You're So Vain"	7 weeks
9 April	Roberta Flack	"Killing Me Softly with His Song"	2 weeks
16 April	Roberta Flack	"Killing Me Softly with His Song"	2 weeks
23 April	The Carpenters	"Top of the World"	4 weeks
30 April	The Carpenters	"Top of the World"	4 weeks
7 May	The Carpenters	"Top of the World"	4 weeks
14 May	The Carpenters	"Top of the World"	4 weeks
21 May	Tony Orlando and Dawn	"Tie a Yellow Ribbon Round the Ole Oak Tree"	7 weeks
28 May	Tony Orlando and Dawn	"Tie a Yellow Ribbon Round the Ole Oak Tree"	7 weeks
4 June	Tony Orlando and Dawn	"Tie a Yellow Ribbon Round the Ole Oak Tree"	7 weeks
11 June	Tony Orlando and Dawn	"Tie a Yellow Ribbon Round the Ole Oak Tree"	7 weeks
18 June	Tony Orlando and Dawn	"Tie a Yellow Ribbon Round the Ole Oak Tree"	7 weeks
25 June	Tony Orlando and Dawn	"Tie a Yellow Ribbon Round the Ole Oak Tree"	7 weeks
2 July	Tony Orlando and Dawn	"Tie a Yellow Ribbon Round the Ole Oak Tree"	7 weeks
9 July	Jud Strunk	"Daisy a Day"	2 weeks
16 July	Jud Strunk	"Daisy a Day"	2 weeks
23 July	Maureen McGovern	"The Morning After"	1 week
30 July	Col Joye	"Heaven Is My Woman's Love"	2 weeks
6 August	Col Joye	"Heaven Is My Woman's Love"	2 weeks
13 August	Helen Reddy	"Delta Dawn"	5 weeks
20 August	Helen Reddy	"Delta Dawn"	5 weeks
27 August	Helen Reddy	"Delta Dawn"	5 weeks
3 September	Helen Reddy	"Delta Dawn"	5 weeks
10 September	Helen Reddy	"Delta Dawn"	5 weeks
17 September	Shirley Bassey	"Never Never Never"	2 weeks
24 September	Shirley Bassey	"Never Never Never"	2 weeks
1 October	Suzi Quatro	"Can the Can"	6 weeks
8 October	Suzi Quatro	"Can the Can"	6 weeks
15 October	Suzi Quatro	"Can the Can"	6 weeks
22 October	Suzi Quatro	"Can the Can"	6 weeks
29 October	Suzi Quatro	"Can the Can"	6 weeks
5 November	Suzi Quatro	"Can the Can"	6 weeks
12 November	Vicki Lawrence	"He Did With Me"	1 week
19 November	The Rolling Stones	"Angie"	5 weeks
26 November	The Rolling Stones	"Angie"	5 weeks
3 December	The Rolling Stones	"Angie"	5 weeks
10 December	The Rolling Stones	"Angie"	5 weeks
17 December	The Rolling Stones	"Angie"	5 weeks
24 December	Helen Reddy	"Leave Me Alone (Ruby Red Dress)"	4 weeks
31 December	Helen Reddy	"Leave Me Alone (Ruby Red Dress)"	4 weeks

Other hits
Songs peaking at number two included "I Am Woman" by Helen Reddy, "Crocodile Rock" by Elton John, "Funny Face" by Donna Fargo, "Last Song" by Edward Bear, "Part of the Union" by Strawbs, "The Twelfth of Never" by Donny Osmond, "And I Love You So" by Perry Como, "Say, Has Anybody Seen My Sweet Gypsy Rose" by Tony Orlando and Dawn, "Dancin' (on a Saturday Night)" by Barry Blue, "I Am Pegasus" by Ross Ryan, and "The Ballroom Blitz" by Sweet.

Other hits (with their peak positions noted) were "The Happiest Girl in the Whole U.S.A." by Donna Fargo (3), "I Can See Clearly Now" by Johnny Nash (3), "Dueling Banjos" by Eric Weissberg (3), "I Don't Wanna Play House" by Barbara Ray (3), "Rubber Bullets" by 10cc (3), "Monster Mash" by Bobby Pickett (3), "Dreams are a Ten Penny" by Kincade (4), "Don't Expect Me to Be Your Friend" by Lobo (4), "Half-Breed" by Cher (4), "Mouldy Old Dough" by Lieutenant Pigeon (5), and "Daniel" by Elton John (7).

Hits by Australasian artists included "Cassandra" by Sherbet, "Let Me Be There" by Olivia Newton-John, and "Everything is Out of Season" by Johnny Farnham

== 1974 ==
Date	Artist	Single	Weeks at number one
7 January	Helen Reddy	"Leave Me Alone (Ruby Red Dress)"	4 weeks
14 January	Helen Reddy	"Leave Me Alone (Ruby Red Dress)"	4 weeks
21 January	Suzi Quatro	"48 Crash"	1 week
28 January	Ringo Starr	"Photograph"	1 week
4 February	David Bowie	"Sorrow"	2 weeks
11 February	David Bowie	"Sorrow"	2 weeks
18 February	Grahame Bond	"Farewell Aunty Jack"	3 weeks
25 February	Grahame Bond	"Farewell Aunty Jack"	3 weeks
4 March	Grahame Bond	"Farewell Aunty Jack"	3 weeks
11 March	Alvin Stardust	"My Coo Ca Choo"	7 weeks
18 March	Alvin Stardust	"My Coo Ca Choo"	7 weeks
25 March	Alvin Stardust	"My Coo Ca Choo"	7 weeks
1 April	Alvin Stardust	"My Coo Ca Choo"	7 weeks
8 April	Alvin Stardust	"My Coo Ca Choo"	7 weeks
15 April	Alvin Stardust	"My Coo Ca Choo"	7 weeks
22 April	Alvin Stardust	"My Coo Ca Choo"	7 weeks
29 April	Terry Jacks	"Seasons in the Sun"	4 weeks
6 May	Terry Jacks	"Seasons in the Sun"	4 weeks
13 May	Terry Jacks	"Seasons in the Sun"	4 weeks
20 May	Terry Jacks	"Seasons in the Sun"	4 weeks
27 May	Suzi Quatro	"Devil Gate Drive"	3 weeks
3 June	Suzi Quatro	"Devil Gate Drive"	3 weeks
10 June	Suzi Quatro	"Devil Gate Drive"	3 weeks
17 June	Paper Lace	"Billy Don't Be a Hero"	8 weeks
24 June	Paper Lace	"Billy Don't Be a Hero"	8 weeks
1 July	Paper Lace	"Billy Don't Be a Hero"	8 weeks
8 July	Paper Lace	"Billy Don't Be a Hero"	8 weeks
15 July	Paper Lace	"Billy Don't Be a Hero"	8 weeks
22 July	Paper Lace	"Billy Don't Be a Hero"	8 weeks
29 July	Paper Lace	"Billy Don't Be a Hero"	8 weeks
5 August	Paper Lace	"Billy Don't Be a Hero"	8 weeks
12 August	Stevie Wright	"Evie"	6 weeks
19 August	Stevie Wright	"Evie"	6 weeks
26 August	Stevie Wright	"Evie"	6 weeks
2 September	Stevie Wright	"Evie"	6 weeks
9 September	Stevie Wright	"Evie"	6 weeks
16 September	Stevie Wright	"Evie"	6 weeks
23 September	Paper Lace	"The Night Chicago Died"	8 weeks
30 September	Paper Lace	"The Night Chicago Died"	8 weeks
7 October	Paper Lace	"The Night Chicago Died"	8 weeks
14 October	Paper Lace	"The Night Chicago Died"	8 weeks
21 October	Paper Lace	"The Night Chicago Died"	8 weeks
28 October	Paper Lace	"The Night Chicago Died"	8 weeks
4 November	Paper Lace	"The Night Chicago Died"	8 weeks
11 November	Paper Lace	"The Night Chicago Died"	8 weeks
18 November	Olivia Newton-John	"I Honestly Love You"	4 weeks
25 November	Olivia Newton-John	"I Honestly Love You"	4 weeks
2 December	Olivia Newton-John	"I Honestly Love You"	4 weeks
9 December	Olivia Newton-John	"I Honestly Love You"	4 weeks
16 December	Carl Douglas	"Kung Fu Fighting"	3 weeks
23 December	Carl Douglas	"Kung Fu Fighting"	3 weeks
30 December	Carl Douglas	"Kung Fu Fighting"	3 weeks

Other hits
Songs peaking at number two included "She (Didn't Remember My Name)" by Osmosis, "The Air That I Breathe" by The Hollies, "The Entertainer" by Marvin Hamlisch, "The Streak" by Ray Stevens, "Would You Lay with Me (In a Field of Stone)" by Judy Stone, "Sugar Baby Love" by The Rubettes, "Rock Your Baby" by George McCrae, "Can't Stop Myself From Loving You" by William Shakespeare, "(You're) Having My Baby" by Paul Anka, and "Hey Paula" by Ernie Sigley and Denise Drysdale.

Other hits (with their peak positions noted) were "The Lord's Prayer" by Sister Janet Mead (3), "You Make Me Feel Brand New" by The Stylistics (3), "Goodbye Yellow Brick Road" by Elton John (4), "I Love You Love Me Love" by Gary Glitter (4), "Hooked on a Feeling" by Blue Swede (4), "Daytona Demon" by Suzi Quatro (4), "Waterloo" by ABBA (4), "Sundown" by Gordon Lightfoot (4), "Candle in the Wind" / "Bennie and the Jets" by Elton John (5), "Annie's Song" by John Denver (5), and "You're Sixteen" by Ringo Starr (6), and "The Way We Were" by Barbra Streisand (7).

Hits by Australasian artists included "Slipstream" and "Silvery Moon" by Sherbet, "Good Morning (How Are You?)/We Will Never Change" by The Moir Sisters, "Mama's Little Girl" by Linda George, and "Long Live Love" by Olivia Newton-John

== 1975 ==
Date	Artist	Single	Weeks at number one
6 January	Daryl Braithwaite	"You're My World"	3 weeks
13 January	Daryl Braithwaite	"You're My World"	3 weeks
20 January	Daryl Braithwaite	"You're My World"	3 weeks
27 January	Billy Swan	"I Can Help"	1 week
3 February	William Shakespeare	"My Little Angel"	3 weeks
10 February	William Shakespeare	"My Little Angel"	3 weeks
17 February	William Shakespeare	"My Little Angel"	3 weeks
24 February	The Carpenters	"Please Mr. Postman"	5 weeks
3 March	The Carpenters	"Please Mr. Postman"	5 weeks
10 March	The Carpenters	"Please Mr. Postman"	5 weeks
17 March	The Carpenters	"Please Mr. Postman"	5 weeks
24 March	The Carpenters	"Please Mr. Postman"	5 weeks
31 March	Skyhooks	"Horror Movie"	2 weeks
7 April	Skyhooks	"Horror Movie"	2 weeks
14 April	Bob Hudson	"The Newcastle Song"	4 weeks
21 April	Bob Hudson	"The Newcastle Song"	4 weeks
28 April	Bob Hudson	"The Newcastle Song"	4 weeks
5 May	Bob Hudson	"The Newcastle Song"	4 weeks
12 May	Sherbet	"Summer Love"	2 weeks
19 May	Sherbet	"Summer Love"	2 weeks
26 May	Pilot	"January"	8 weeks
2 June	Pilot	"January"	8 weeks
9 June	Pilot	"January"	8 weeks
16 June	Pilot	"January"	8 weeks
23 June	Pilot	"January"	8 weeks
30 June	Pilot	"January"	8 weeks
7 July	Pilot	"January"	8 weeks
14 July	Pilot	"January"	8 weeks
21 July	Freddy Fender	"Before the Next Teardrop Falls"	1 week
28 July	Bay City Rollers	"Bye Bye Baby"	1 week
4 August	Sweet	"Fox on the Run"	6 weeks
11 August	Sweet	"Fox on the Run"	6 weeks
18 August	Sweet	"Fox on the Run"	6 weeks
25 August	Sweet	"Fox on the Run"	6 weeks
1 September	Sweet	"Fox on the Run"	6 weeks
8 September	Sweet	"Fox on the Run"	6 weeks
15 September	Captain & Tennille	"Love Will Keep Us Together"	4 weeks
22 September	Captain & Tennille	"Love Will Keep Us Together"	4 weeks
29 September	Captain & Tennille	"Love Will Keep Us Together"	4 weeks
6 October	Captain & Tennille	"Love Will Keep Us Together"	4 weeks
13 October	ABBA	"I Do, I Do, I Do, I Do, I Do"	3 weeks
20 October	ABBA	"I Do, I Do, I Do, I Do, I Do"	3 weeks
27 October	ABBA	"I Do, I Do, I Do, I Do, I Do"	3 weeks
3 November	ABBA	"Mamma Mia"	10 weeks
10 November	ABBA	"Mamma Mia"	10 weeks
17 November	ABBA	"Mamma Mia"	10 weeks
24 November	ABBA	"Mamma Mia"	10 weeks
1 December	ABBA	"Mamma Mia"	10 weeks
8 December	ABBA	"Mamma Mia"	10 weeks
15 December	ABBA	"Mamma Mia"	10 weeks
22 December	ABBA	"Mamma Mia"	10 weeks
29 December	ABBA	"Mamma Mia"	10 weeks

Other hits
Songs peaking at number two included "The Wild One" by Suzi Quatro, "When Will I See You Again" by The Three Degrees, "Santa Never Made It into Darwin" by Bill and Boyd, "Blue Angel" by Gene Pitney, "If You Love Me (Let Me Know)" by Olivia Newton-John, "Ego Is Not a Dirty Word" and "All My Friends Are Getting Married" by Skyhooks, "Give a Little Love" by Bay City Rollers, "Paloma Blanca" by George Baker Selection and "Sailing" by Rod Stewart.

Other hits (with their peak positions noted) were "Gee Baby" by Peter Shelley (3), "Lucy in the Sky with Diamonds" by Elton John" (3), "Never Can Say Goodbye" by Gloria Gaynor (3), "My Eyes Adored You" by Frankie Valli (3), "Roll Over Lay Down" by Status Quo (3), "The Last Farewell" by Roger Whittaker (3), "I'm Not in Love" by 10cc (3), "Sky High" by British Jigsaw (3), "You Ain't Seen Nothing Yet" by Bachman-Turner Overdrive (4), "Girls on the Avenue" by Richard Clapton (4), "Gonna Make You a Star" by David Essex (4), "Mandy' by Barry Manilow (4), "Philadelphia Freedom" by The Elton John Band (4), "The Love Game" by John Paul Young (4), "Rhinestone Cowboy" by Glen Campbell (5), and "Million Dollar Riff" by Skyhooks (6).

Hits by Australasian artists included "Matter of Time" / "Only One You" by Sherbet, "Sparrow Song" by The Seekers, "Have You Never been Mellow" by Olivia Newton-John, and "High Voltage" by AC/DC.

== 1976 ==
Date	Artist	Single	Weeks at number one
5 January	ABBA	"Mamma Mia"	10 weeks
12 January	ABBA	"SOS"	1 week
19 January	Ted Mulry Gang	"Jump in My Car"	6 weeks
26 January	Ted Mulry Gang	"Jump in My Car"	6 weeks
2 February	Ted Mulry Gang	"Jump in My Car"	6 weeks
9 February	Ted Mulry Gang	"Jump in My Car"	6 weeks
16 February	Ted Mulry Gang	"Jump in My Car"	6 weeks
23 February	Ted Mulry Gang	"Jump in My Car"	6 weeks
1 March	C. W. McCall	"Convoy"	3 weeks
8 March	C. W. McCall	"Convoy"	3 weeks
15 March	C. W. McCall	"Convoy"	3 weeks
22 March	Queen	"Bohemian Rhapsody"	2 weeks
29 March	Queen	"Bohemian Rhapsody"	2 weeks
5 April	ABBA	"Fernando"	14 weeks
12 April	ABBA	"Fernando"	14 weeks
19 April	ABBA	"Fernando"	14 weeks
26 April	ABBA	"Fernando"	14 weeks
3 May	ABBA	"Fernando"	14 weeks
10 May	ABBA	"Fernando"	14 weeks
17 May	ABBA	"Fernando"	14 weeks
24 May	ABBA	"Fernando"	14 weeks
31 May	ABBA	"Fernando"	14 weeks
7 June	ABBA	"Fernando"	14 weeks
14 June	ABBA	"Fernando"	14 weeks
21 June	ABBA	"Fernando"	14 weeks
28 June	ABBA	"Fernando"	14 weeks
5 July	ABBA	"Fernando"	14 weeks
12 July	Sherbet	"Howzat"	4 weeks
19 July	Sherbet	"Howzat"	4 weeks
26 July	Sherbet	"Howzat"	4 weeks
2 August	Sherbet	"Howzat"	4 weeks
9 August	Fox	"S-S-S Single Bed"	3 weeks
16 August	Fox	"S-S-S Single Bed"	3 weeks
23 August	Fox	"S-S-S Single Bed"	3 weeks
30 August	Elton John and Kiki Dee	"Don't Go Breaking My Heart"	1 week
6 September	ABBA	"Dancing Queen"	8 weeks
13 September	ABBA	"Dancing Queen"	8 weeks
20 September	ABBA	"Dancing Queen"	8 weeks
27 September	ABBA	"Dancing Queen"	8 weeks
4 October	ABBA	"Dancing Queen"	8 weeks
11 October	ABBA	"Dancing Queen"	8 weeks
18 October	ABBA	"Dancing Queen"	8 weeks
25 October	ABBA	"Dancing Queen"	8 weeks
1 November	Bryan Ferry	"Let's Stick Together"	2 weeks
8 November	Bryan Ferry	"Let's Stick Together"	2 weeks
15 November	ABBA	"Money, Money, Money"	6 weeks
22 November	ABBA	"Money, Money, Money"	6 weeks
29 November	ABBA	"Money, Money, Money"	6 weeks
6 December	ABBA	"Money, Money, Money"	6 weeks
13 December	ABBA	"Money, Money, Money"	6 weeks
20 December	ABBA	"Money, Money, Money"	6 weeks
27 December	Chicago	"If You Leave Me Now"	5 weeks

Other hits
Songs peaking at number two included "Hold Me Close" by David Essex, "Slipping Away" by Max Merritt & The Meteors, "December, 1963 (Oh, What a Night)" by The Four Seasons, "I Hate the Music" by John Paul Young, and "Mississippi" by Pussycat.

Other hits (with their peak positions noted) were "Money Honey" by Bay City Rollers (3), "Darktown Strutters' Ball" by Ted Mulry Gang (3), "Moviestar" by Harpo (3), "Love Really Hurts Without You" by Billy Ocean (3), "We Do It" by R&J Stone (3), "Devil Woman" by Cliff Richard (3), "Tonight's the Night (Gonna Be Alright)" by Rod Stewart (3), "Jeans On" by David Dundas (3), "Right Back Where We Started From" by Maxine Nightingale (4), "Love to Love You Baby" by Donna Summer (4), "You Sexy Thing" by Hot Chocolate (4), "A Glass of Champagne" by Sailor (4), "City Lights" by David Essex (4), "Rock Me" by ABBA (4), "Kiss and Say Goodbye" by The Manhattans (4), "Disco Duck" by Rick Dees & His Cast of Idiots (4), "That's the Way (I Like It)" by KC & The Sunshine Band (5), "Save Your Kisses for Me" by Brotherhood of Man (5), "I Write the Songs" by Barry Manilow (5), "Let Your Love Flow" by Bellamy Brothers (6), and "All By Myself" by Eric Carmen (7).

Hits by Australasian artists included "Child's Play" and "Matter of Time"/"Only One You" by Sherbet, "Old Sid" by Daryl Braithwaite, "It's a Long Way to the Top (If You Wanna Rock 'n' Roll)" by AC/DC, "Blue Jeans" by Skyhooks, "Crazy" by Ted Mulry Gang, and "Keep On Smilin'" by John Paul Young.

== 1977 ==
Date	Artist	Single	Weeks at number one
3 January	Chicago	"If You Leave Me Now"	5 weeks
10 January	Chicago	"If You Leave Me Now"	5 weeks
17 January	Chicago	"If You Leave Me Now"	5 weeks
23 January	Chicago	"If You Leave Me Now"	5 weeks
31 January	Pussyfoot	"The Way That You Do It"	7 weeks
7 February	Pussyfoot	"The Way That You Do It"	7 weeks
14 February	Pussyfoot	"The Way That You Do It"	7 weeks
21 February	Pussyfoot	"The Way That You Do It"	7 weeks
28 February	Pussyfoot	"The Way That You Do It"	7 weeks
7 March	Pussyfoot	"The Way That You Do It"	7 weeks
14 March	Pussyfoot	"The Way That You Do It"	7 weeks
21 March	Mary MacGregor	"Torn Between Two Lovers"	4 weeks
28 March	Mary MacGregor	"Torn Between Two Lovers"	4 weeks
4 April	Mary MacGregor	"Torn Between Two Lovers"	4 weeks
11 April	Mary MacGregor	"Torn Between Two Lovers"	4 weeks
18 April	David Soul	"Don't Give Up on Us"	3 weeks
25 April	David Soul	"Don't Give Up on Us"	3 weeks
2 May	David Soul	"Don't Give Up on Us"	3 weeks
9 May	Julie Covington	"Don't Cry for Me Argentina"	7 weeks
16 May	Julie Covington	"Don't Cry for Me Argentina"	7 weeks
23 May	Julie Covington	"Don't Cry for Me Argentina"	7 weeks
30 May	Julie Covington	"Don't Cry for Me Argentina"	7 weeks
6 June	Julie Covington	"Don't Cry for Me Argentina"	7 weeks
13 June	Julie Covington	"Don't Cry for Me Argentina"	7 weeks
20 June	Julie Covington	"Don't Cry for Me Argentina"	7 weeks
27 June	Little River Band	"Help Is on Its Way"	1 week
4 July	Dr. Hook	"Walk Right In"	5 weeks
11 July	Dr. Hook	"Walk Right In"	5 weeks
18 July	Dr. Hook	"Walk Right In"	5 weeks
25 July	Dr. Hook	"Walk Right In"	5 weeks
1 August	Dr. Hook	"Walk Right In"	5 weeks
8 August	Peter Allen	"I Go to Rio"	5 weeks
15 August	Peter Allen	"I Go to Rio"	5 weeks
22 August	Peter Allen	"I Go to Rio"	5 weeks
29 August	Peter Allen	"I Go to Rio"	5 weeks
5 September	Peter Allen	"I Go to Rio"	5 weeks
12 September	Carole Bayer Sager	"You're Moving Out Today"	4 weeks
19 September	Carole Bayer Sager	"You're Moving Out Today"	4 weeks
26 September	Carole Bayer Sager	"You're Moving Out Today"	4 weeks
3 October	Carole Bayer Sager	"You're Moving Out Today"	4 weeks
10 October	Donna Summer	"I Feel Love"	1 week
17 October	Andy Gibb	"I Just Want to Be Your Everything"	7 weeks
24 October	Andy Gibb	"I Just Want to Be Your Everything"	7 weeks
31 October	Andy Gibb	"I Just Want to Be Your Everything"	7 weeks
7 November	Andy Gibb	"I Just Want to Be Your Everything"	7 weeks
14 November	Andy Gibb	"I Just Want to Be Your Everything"	7 weeks
21 November	Andy Gibb	"I Just Want to Be Your Everything"	7 weeks
28 November	Andy Gibb	"I Just Want to Be Your Everything"	7 weeks
5 December	Rod Stewart	"You're in My Heart"	1 week
12 December	Wings	"Mull of Kintyre"	11 weeks
19 December	Wings	"Mull of Kintyre"	11 weeks
26 December	Wings	"Mull of Kintyre"	11 weeks

Other hits
Songs peaking at number two included "Every Little Bit Hurts" by Shirley, "You Make Me Feel Like Dancing" by Leo Sayer, "Livin' Thing" by Electric Light Orchestra, "That's Rock 'n' Roll" by Shaun Cassidy, "Living Next Door To Alice" by Smokie, "You and Me" by Alice Cooper, "Magazine Madonna" by Sherbet, "Lido Shuffle" / "What Can I Say" by Boz Scaggs, "Ain't Gonna Bump No More (With No Big Fat Woman)" by Joe Tex, "Don't Fall in Love" by The Ferrets, "In the Flesh" by Blondie, and "You" by Marcia Hines.

Other hits (with their peak positions noted) were "The Best Disco in Town" by The Ritchie Family (3), "You've Gotta Get Up and Dance" by Supercharge (3), "It's All Over Now, Baby Blue" by Graham Bonnet (3), "Star Wars Theme/Cantina Band" by Meco (3), "Dance Little Lady Dance" by Tina Charles (4), "Rio" by Michael Nesmith (4), "Daddy Cool" by Boney M. (5), "Stand Tall" by Burton Cummings (5), "Ma Baker" by Boney M. (5), "The Things We Do For Love " by 10cc (5), "Evergreen (Love Theme from A Star Is Born)" by Barbra Streisand (5), "Love Has No Pride" / "Fly Away" by Daryl Braithwaite (5), "Fanfare for the Common Man" by Emerson, Lake & Palmer (5), "Don't Leave Me This Way" by Thelma Houston (6), "Magic Man" by Heart (6), "This Is Tomorrow" by Bryan Ferry (6), "Rich Girl" by Daryl Hall & John Oates (6), and " Lucille" by Kenny Rogers (7).

Hits by Australasian artists included "Rock Me Gently" by Sherbet, "Get That Jive" by Dragon, "I Wanna Do It with You" by John Paul Young, "My Little Girl" by Ted Mulry Gang, and "What I Did For Love" by Marcia Hines.

== 1978 ==
Date	Artist	Single	Weeks at number one
2 January	Wings	"Mull of Kintyre"	11 weeks
9 January	Wings	"Mull of Kintyre"	11 weeks
16 January	Wings	"Mull of Kintyre"	11 weeks
23 January	Wings	"Mull of Kintyre"	11 weeks
30 January	Wings	"Mull of Kintyre"	11 weeks
6 February	Wings	"Mull of Kintyre"	11 weeks
13 February	Wings	"Mull of Kintyre"	11 weeks
20 February	Wings	"Mull of Kintyre"	11 weeks
27 February	Bonnie Tyler	"It's a Heartache"	4 weeks
6 March	Bonnie Tyler	"It's a Heartache"	4 weeks
13 March	Bonnie Tyler	"It's a Heartache"	4 weeks
20 March	Bonnie Tyler	"It's a Heartache"	4 weeks
27 March	The Babys	"Isn't It Time"	1 week
3 April	Bee Gees	"Stayin' Alive"	7 weeks
10 April	Bee Gees	"Stayin' Alive"	7 weeks
17 April	Bee Gees	"Stayin' Alive"	7 weeks
24 April	Bee Gees	"Stayin' Alive"	7 weeks
1 May	Bee Gees	"Stayin' Alive"	7 weeks
8 May	Bee Gees	"Stayin' Alive"	7 weeks
15 May	Bee Gees	"Stayin' Alive"	7 weeks
22 May	Kate Bush	"Wuthering Heights"	3 weeks
29 May	Kate Bush	"Wuthering Heights"	3 weeks
5 June	Kate Bush	"Wuthering Heights"	3 weeks
12 June	Eruption	"I Can't Stand the Rain"	1 week
19 June	Gerry Rafferty	"Baker Street"	1 week
26 June	John Travolta and Olivia Newton-John	"You're the One That I Want"	9 weeks
3 July	John Travolta and Olivia Newton-John	"You're the One That I Want"	9 weeks
10 July	Boney M.	"Rivers of Babylon"	6 weeks
17 July	Boney M.	"Rivers of Babylon"	6 weeks
24 July	Boney M.	"Rivers of Babylon"	6 weeks
31 July	Boney M.	"Rivers of Babylon"	6 weeks
7 August	Boney M.	"Rivers of Babylon"	6 weeks
14 August	Boney M.	"Rivers of Babylon"	6 weeks
21 August	John Travolta and Olivia Newton-John	"You're the One That I Want"	9 weeks
28 August	John Travolta and Olivia Newton-John	"You're the One That I Want"	9 weeks
4 September	John Travolta and Olivia Newton-John	"You're the One That I Want"	9 weeks
11 September	John Travolta and Olivia Newton-John	"You're the One That I Want"	9 weeks
18 September	John Travolta and Olivia Newton-John	"You're the One That I Want"	9 weeks
25 September	John Travolta and Olivia Newton-John	"You're the One That I Want"	9 weeks
2 October	John Travolta and Olivia Newton-John	"You're the One That I Want"	9 weeks
9 October	Dragon	"Are You Old Enough?"	2 weeks
16 October	Dragon	"Are You Old Enough?"	2 weeks
23 October	La Belle Epoque	"Black Is Black"	1 week
30 October	Commodores	"Three Times a Lady"	5 weeks
6 November	Commodores	"Three Times a Lady"	5 weeks
13 November	Commodores	"Three Times a Lady"	5 weeks
20 November	Commodores	"Three Times a Lady"	5 weeks
27 November	Commodores	"Three Times a Lady"	5 weeks
4 December	Boney M.	"Rasputin"	2 weeks
11 December	Boney M.	"Rasputin"	2 weeks
18 December	Exile	"Kiss You All Over"	1 week
25 December	Village People	"Y.M.C.A."	5 weeks

Other hits
Songs peaking at number two included "April Sun in Cuba" by Dragon, "Surfin' U.S.A." and "I Was Made for Dancin'" by Leif Garrett, "Emotion" by Samantha Sang, "Ebony Eyes" by Bob Welch, "Warm Ride" by Graham Bonnet, "Grease" by Frankie Valli, "Hopelessly Devoted to You" by Olivia Newton-John, "Dreadlock Holiday" by 10cc, and "You Needed Me" by Anne Murray.

Other hits (with their peak positions noted) were " How Deep Is You Love" by Bee Gees (3), "Blue Bayou" by Linda Ronstadt (3), "If I Had Words" by Scott Fitzgerald & Yvonne Keeley (3), "You Took the Words Right Out of My Mouth" by Meat Loaf (3), "Sometimes When We Touch" by Dan Hill (3), "Can't Smile Without You" by Barry Manilow (3), "Love Is In The Air" by John Paul Young (3), "Macho Man" by Village People (3), "Dancing In The City" by Marshall Hain (3), "Jack and Jill" by Raydio (4), "Down Among the Dead Men" by "Flash and the Pan" (4), "I Need a Lover" by Johnny Cougar (5), "The Name of the Game" by ABBA (6), "Summer Nights" by John Travolta and Olivia Newton-John (6), "Sultans of Swing" by Dire Straits (6), "You Light Up My Life" by Debby Boone (7), and "Night Fever" by Bee Gees (7).

Hits by Australasian artists included "Women in Uniform" by Skyhooks, "Standing in the Rain" by John Paul Young, "Another Night on the Road" by Sherbet, and "Walking in the Rain" by Cheetah.

== 1979 ==
Date	Artist	Single	Weeks at number one
1 January	Village People	"Y.M.C.A."	5 weeks
8 January	Village People	"Y.M.C.A."	5 weeks
15 January	Village People	"Y.M.C.A."	5 weeks
22 January	Village People	"Y.M.C.A."	5 weeks
29 January	Rod Stewart	"Da Ya Think I'm Sexy?"	2 weeks
5 February	Rod Stewart	"Da Ya Think I'm Sexy?"	2 weeks
12 February	The Mojo Singers	"C'mon Aussie C'mon"	2 weeks
19 February	The Mojo Singers	"C'mon Aussie C'mon"	2 weeks
26 February	Chic	"Le Freak"	5 weeks
5 March	Chic	"Le Freak"	5 weeks
12 March	Chic	"Le Freak"	5 weeks
19 March	Chic	"Le Freak"	5 weeks
26 March	Chic	"Le Freak"	5 weeks
2 April	Blondie	"Heart of Glass"	5 weeks
9 April	Blondie	"Heart of Glass"	5 weeks
16 April	Blondie	"Heart of Glass"	5 weeks
23 April	Blondie	"Heart of Glass"	5 weeks
30 April	Blondie	"Heart of Glass"	5 weeks
7 May	Racey	"Lay Your Love on Me"	8 weeks
14 May	Racey	"Lay Your Love on Me"	8 weeks
21 May	Racey	"Lay Your Love on Me"	8 weeks
28 May	Racey	"Lay Your Love on Me"	8 weeks
4 June	Racey	"Lay Your Love on Me"	8 weeks
11 June	Racey	"Lay Your Love on Me"	8 weeks
18 June	Racey	"Lay Your Love on Me"	8 weeks
25 June	Racey	"Lay Your Love on Me"	8 weeks
2 July	Donna Summer	"Hot Stuff"	1 week
9 July	M	"Pop Muzik"	3 weeks
16 July	M	"Pop Muzik"	3 weeks
23 July	M	"Pop Muzik"	3 weeks
30 July	Racey	"Some Girls"	4 weeks
6 August	Racey	"Some Girls"	4 weeks
13 August	Racey	"Some Girls"	4 weeks
20 August	Racey	"Some Girls"	4 weeks
27 August	Two-Man Band	"Up There Cazaly"	1 week
3 September	The Knack	"My Sharona"	5 weeks
10 September	The Knack	"My Sharona"	5 weeks
17 September	The Knack	"My Sharona"	5 weeks
24 September	The Knack	"My Sharona"	5 weeks
1 October	The Knack	"My Sharona"	5 weeks
8 October	Patrick Hernandez	"Born to Be Alive"	5 weeks
15 October	Patrick Hernandez	"Born to Be Alive"	5 weeks
22 October	Patrick Hernandez	"Born to Be Alive"	5 weeks
29 October	Patrick Hernandez	"Born to Be Alive"	5 weeks
5 November	Patrick Hernandez	"Born to Be Alive"	5 weeks
12 November	The Boomtown Rats	"I Don't Like Mondays"	2 weeks
19 November	The Boomtown Rats	"I Don't Like Mondays"	2 weeks
26 November	Mi-Sex	"Computer Games"	1 week
3 December	The Buggles	"Video Killed the Radio Star"	7 weeks (2 weeks in Jan. 1980)
10 December	The Buggles	"Video Killed the Radio Star"	7 weeks (2 weeks in Jan. 1980)
17 December	The Buggles	"Video Killed the Radio Star"	7 weeks (2 weeks in Jan. 1980)
24 December	The Buggles	"Video Killed the Radio Star"	7 weeks (2 weeks in Jan. 1980)
31 December	The Buggles	"Video Killed the Radio Star"	7 weeks (2 weeks in Jan. 1980)

Other hits
Songs peaking at number two included "Ça plane pour moi" by Plastic Bertrand, "Stumblin' In" by Suzi Quatro and Chris Norman, "Tragedy" by Bee Gees, "Hit Me with Your Rhythm Stick" by Ian Dury and The Blockheads, "Baby It's You" by Promises, "Knock on Wood" by Amii Stewart, "Lucky Number" by Lene Lovich, "Bright Eyes" by Art Garfunkel, "I Was Made for Lovin' You" by Kiss and "Goosebumps" by Christie Allen.

Other hits (with their peak positions noted) were "Ring My Bell" by Anita Ward (3), "Hot Summer Nights" by Night (3), "We Don't Talk Anymore" by Cliff Richard (3), "Tusk" by Fleetwood Mac (3), and "Babe" by Styx (3), "Chiquitita" by ABBA (4), "On the Inside" by Lynne Hamilton, "Get Used to It" by Roger Voudouris (4), "Too Much Heaven" by Bee Gees (5), "I Will Survive" by Gloria Gaynor (5), "Cool for Cats" by Squeeze (5), "Gold" by John Stewart (5), "My Life" by Billy Joel (6), "Every Time I Think of You" by The Babys (6), "Goodnight Tonight" by Wings (6), "Boogie Wonderland" by Earth, Wind & Fire (6), "Don't Bring Me Down" by Electric Light Orchestra (6), "Fire" by The Pointer Sisters (7), and "In the Navy" by Village People (7).

Hits by Australasian artists included "Six Ribbons" by Jon English, "I'm Coming Home" by Birtles & Goble, "Dream Lover" by Glenn Shorrock, "Something's Missing (In My Life)" by Marcia Hines, "I See Red" by Split Enz, and "The Nips Are Getting Bigger" by Mental as Anything.

== See also ==
- Music of Australia
- Lists of UK Singles Chart number ones
- List of UK Singles Chart number ones of the 1970s
- List of Billboard number-one singles
