= List of top 25 singles for 1974 in Australia =

Top 25 singles of 1974 < 1973 1975 >

Other Australian top charts for 1974
- top 25 albums

Australian top 40 charts for the 1980s
- singles
- albums

Australian number-one charts of 1974
- albums
- singles

The following lists the top 25 (end of year) charting singles on the Australian Singles Charts, for the year of 1974. These were the best charting singles in Australia for 1974. The source for this year is the "Kent Music Report".

#	Title	Artist	Highest pos. reached	Weeks at No. 1
1.	"My Coo Ca Choo"	Alvin Stardust	1	7
2.	"Billy Don't Be a Hero"	Paper Lace	1	8
3.	"Evie"	Stevie Wright	1	6
4.	"The Night Chicago Died"	Paper Lace	1	8
5.	"Seasons in the Sun"	Terry Jacks	1	4
6.	"Farewell Aunty Jack"	Grahame Bond	1	3
7.	"Can't Stop Myself From Loving You"	William Shakespeare	2	
8.	"Leave Me Alone (Ruby Red Dress)"	Helen Reddy	1	4
9.	"The Ballroom Blitz"	Sweet	2	
10.	"I Honestly Love You"	Olivia Newton-John	1	4
11.	"The Lord's Prayer"	Sister Janet Mead	3	
12.	"The Entertainer"	Marvin Hamlisch	2	
13.	"Devil Gate Drive"	Suzi Quatro	1	3
14.	"I Am Pegasus"	Ross Ryan	2	
15.	"(You're) Having My Baby"	Paul Anka	2	
16.	"Sorrow"	David Bowie	1	2
17.	"The Streak"	Ray Stevens	2	
18.	"She (Didn't Remember My Name)"	Osmosis	2	
19.	"I Love You Love Me Love"	Gary Glitter	4	
20.	"Rock Your Baby"	George McCrae	2	
21.	"Sugar Baby Love"	The Rubettes	2	
22.	"Kung Fu Fighting"	Carl Douglas	1	3
23.	"48 Crash"	Suzi Quatro	1	1
24.	"Photograph"	Ringo Starr	1	1
25.	"Goodbye Yellow Brick Road"	Elton John	4	

These charts are calculated by David Kent of the Kent Music Report and they are based on the number of weeks and position the records reach within the top 100 singles for each week.
