= Osmosis (disambiguation) =

Osmosis is the movement of molecules through a membrane.

Osmosis may also refer to:

== Physical ==
- Capillary osmosis, the motion of liquid in a porous body
- Electro-osmosis, the motion of liquid induced by an applied potential
- Forward osmosis, a process that uses a semi-permeable membrane to effect separation of water from dissolved solutes
- Reverse osmosis, a membrane-technology filtration method
- Pressure-retarded osmosis, the salinity gradient energy retrieved from the difference in the salt concentration between seawater and river water
- Standing gradient osmosis, the reabsorption of water against the osmotic gradient in the intestines

== Popular culture ==
- Osmosis Jones, a 2001 live-action/animated comedy film and the main character
  - Osmosis Jones (soundtrack), the soundtrack for the named film
- Osmosis Records (Osmose Productions), a French independent record label
- Ozzmosis, a studio album by heavy metal musician Ozzy Osbourne
- Osmosis, a reissue of an album originally released in 1961 as Bash!
- Osmosis (TV series), a 2019 science-fiction Netflix series
- Osmosis, the K♣ game in manga series Alice In Borderland and subsequent Netflix series

== Other uses ==
- Osmosis (band), a band whose song "She (Didn't Remember My Name)" peaked at number 2 in Australia in 1974; see List of Top 25 singles for 1974 in Australia
- Osmosis demonstration, a set of techniques used in schools to instruct students
- Social osmosis, the indirect infusion of social/cultural knowledge
- Osmosis, is a command line Java application for processing OpenStreetMap data
- Osmosis (solitaire), a solitaire card game
- "Osmosis", song by Good Kid, 2023

== See also ==
- Electrokinetic phenomena
- Osmotic pressure
- Osmotrophy
- Passive transport
- Plasmolysis
