= List of top 25 albums for 1974 in Australia =

Top 25 albums of 1974 < 1973 1975 >

Other Australian top charts for 1974
- top 25 singles

Australian top 40 charts for the 1980s
- singles
- albums

Australian number-one charts of 1974
- albums
- singles

The following lists the top 25 (end of year) charting albums on the Australian Album Charts, for the year of 1974. These were the best charting albums in Australia for 1974. The source for this year is the "Kent Music Report", known from 1987 onwards as the "Australian Music Report".

#	Title	Artist	Highest pos. reached	Weeks at No. 1
1.	Band on the Run	Paul McCartney & Wings	1	7
2.	Goodbye Yellow Brick Road	Elton John	1	3
3.	Hot August Night	Neil Diamond	1	29 (pkd #1 in 1973 & 74)
4.	Caribou	Elton John	1	10
5.	Can the Can	Suzi Quatro	2	
6.	Tubular Bells	Mike Oldfield	1	4
7.	The Sting	Motion Picture Soundtrack	1	7
8.	Jonathan Livingston Seagull	Neil Diamond	1	4
9.	The Dark Side of the Moon	Pink Floyd	2	
10.	Journey to the Centre of the Earth	Rick Wakeman	2	
11.	Quatro	Suzi Quatro	1	6
12.	Pin Ups	David Bowie	4	
13.	Back Home Again	John Denver	2	
14.	Serenade	Neil Diamond	1	7
15.	Ringo	Ringo Starr	2	
16.	Hard Road	Stevie Wright	2	
17.	Goat's Head Soup	The Rolling Stones	1	4
18.	461 Ocean Boulevard	Eric Clapton	2	
19.	Slipstream	Sherbet	3	
20.	Diamond Dogs	David Bowie	3	
21.	My Name Means Horse	Ross Ryan	3	
22.	Buddha and the Chocolate Box	Cat Stevens	5	
23.	Burn	Deep Purple	7	
24.	Bad Company	Bad Company	6	
25.	John Denver's Greatest Hits	John Denver	4	

These charts are calculated by David Kent of the Kent Music Report and they are based on the number of weeks and position the records reach within the top 100 albums for each week.

source: David Kent's "Australian Chart Book 1970-1992"
