= The Gymslips =

English punk band

- Origin: London, England
- Genres: Punk, street punk, post-punk
- Years active: 1981–1985
- Label: Abstract Records
- Past members: Paula Richards; Suzanne Scott; Karen Yarnell; Kathy Barnes; Karen Kay; Sue Vickers; Michelle Chowrimootoo

The Gymslips were an English all-female punk band from London, England, active in the early 1980s.

== Career ==
The original band of Suzanne Scott (bassist / vocalist), Paula Richards (guitarist / vocalist) and Karen Yarnell (drummer) got together in 1980, but first played as The Gymslips in August 1981. The band supported the Dolly Mixture on a UK tour. They contributed the song "Midnight City" to all-female compilation LP, Making Waves.

A tour supporting the Androids of Mu and Rock Goddess followed. In the spring of 1982 they recorded their first of five sessions for John Peel after which they signed to Abstract Records. Their first single "48 Crash" (a cover of the Suzi Quatro hit) was released in November 1982, and the follow-up "Big Sister" was released at the beginning of 1983. April 1983 saw the release of their Rocking With the Renees LP, which also saw the band expand to a four piece with the addition of keyboardist Kathy Barnes.

With two further Peel sessions, good reviews for the "Robot Man" single and the release of the album in America (with the title "Drink Problem" and a different sleeve), The Gymslips' future looked bright. But twelve months of personnel and contractual problems led to Richards having to recruit a new line-up and start all over again.

With Karen Kay on bass, Sue Vickers on keyboards and Michelle Chowrimootoo on drums, The Gymslips recorded their final Peel session in the summer of 1984. They released their last single "Evil Eye" (produced by the Angelic Upstarts' Mond Cowie) in early 1985. The group split up soon after its release.

Karen Yarnell went on to join Serious Drinking and The Blubbery Hellbellies. Paula Richards joined The Deltones and then Potato 5.

Richards and Yarnell teamed up again in The Renees, issuing the LP Have You Got It. They contributed the track "He Called Me a Fat Pig and Walked Out on Me" to the female-only compilation Postcard From Paradise.

== Discography ==
Singles and EPs

Title	Release date	Label	Catalog No:
"48 Crash" / "Miss Nunsweeta"	1982	Abstract	ABS011
"Big Sister" / "Yo-yo" / "Pie'n'Mash"	1983	Abstract	ABS014
"Robot Man" / "Multi Coloured Sugar" / "Take Away"	1983	Abstract	ABS015
"Evil Eye" / "Wonderland"	1985	Abstract	ABS033
"Evil Eye" / "Wonderland" / "Don't Lead Me On "	1985	Abstract	12ABS033

Albums

Title	Release date	Label	Catalog No:
Rocking with the Renees	1983	Abstract	ABT006

Charts

48 Crash (#17 UK Indie), Rockin' with the Renees (#14 UK Indie)
