= List of top 25 singles for 1977 in Australia =

Top 25 singles of 1977 < 1976 1978 >

Other Australian top charts for 1977
- top 25 albums

Australian top 40 charts for the 1980s
- singles
- albums

Australian number-one charts of 1977
- albums
- singles

The following lists the top 25 (end of year) charting singles on the Australian Singles Charts, for the year of 1977. These were the best charting singles in Australia for 1977. The source for this year is the "Kent Music Report".

#	Title	Artist	Highest pos. reached	Weeks at No. 1
1.	"Don't Cry for Me Argentina"	Julie Covington	1	7
2.	"The Way You Do It"	Pussyfoot	1	7
3.	"I Just Want to Be Your Everything"	Andy Gibb	1	7
4.	"That's Rock and Roll"	Shaun Cassidy	2	
5.	"Living Next Door to Alice"	Smokie	2	
6.	"I Go To Rio"	Peter Allen	1	5
7.	"Torn Between Two Lovers"	Mary McGregor	1	4
8.	"Walk Right In"	Dr Hook	1	5
9.	"You're Moving Out Today"	Carole Bayer Sager	1	4
10.	"If You Leave Me Now"	Chicago	1	5 (pkd #1 in 76 & 77)
11.	"Don't Give Up on Us"	David Soul	1	3
12.	"Lido Shuffle" / "What Can I Say"	Boz Scaggs	2	
13.	"You and Me"	Alice Cooper	2	
14.	"Dance Little Lady Dance"	Tina Charles	4	
15.	"When I Need You"	Leo Sayer	8	
16.	"Don't Fall in Love"	Ferrets	2	
17.	"I Feel Love"	Donna Summer	1	1
18.	"Help Is on Its Way"	Little River Band	1	1
19.	"You Gotta Get Up and Dance"	Supercharge	3	
20.	"Mull of Kintyre"	Wings	1	11 (pkd #1 in 77 & 78)
21.	"Don't Leave Me This Way"	Thelma Houston	6	
22.	"Ain't Gonna Bump No More (With No Big Fat Woman)"	Joe Tex	2	
23.	"You're in My Heart"	Rod Stewart	1	1
24.	"Ma Baker"	Boney M	5	
25.	"Lucille"	Kenny Rogers	7	

These charts are calculated by David Kent of the Kent Music Report.
