= Jackie Dixon =

Jackie Dixon may refer to:

- Jacqui Farnham (née Dixon), a character in the TV show Brookside
- Jackie Dixon (singer) who performed in "Pussyfoot" at the 1980 Song for Europe
