= List of top 25 singles for 1976 in Australia =

Top 25 singles of 1976 < 1975 1977 >

Other Australian top charts for 1976
- top 25 albums

Australian top 40 charts for the 1980s
- singles
- albums

Australian number-one charts of 1976
- albums
- singles

The following lists the top 25 (end of year) charting singles on the Australian Singles Charts, for the year of 1976. These were the best charting singles in Australia for 1976. The source for this year is the "Kent Music Report".

#	Title	Artist	Highest pos. reached	Weeks at No. 1
1.	"Fernando"	ABBA	1	14
2.	"Bohemian Rhapsody"	Queen	1	2
3.	"Dancing Queen"	ABBA	1	8
4.	"Howzat (song)"	Sherbet	1	4
5.	"Don't Go Breaking My Heart"	Elton John & Kiki Dee	1	1
6.	"Jump In My Car"	Ted Mulry	1	6
7.	"Money Money Money"	ABBA	1	6
8.	"S-S-S-Single Bed"	Fox	1	3
9.	"Let's Stick Together"	Bryan Ferry	1	2
10.	"Convoy"	C. W. McCall	1	3
11.	"Tonight's the Night"	Rod Stewart	3	
12.	"We Do It"	R & J Stone	2	
13.	"Mississippi"	Pussycat	2	
14.	"Rock Me"	ABBA	4	
15.	"Slipping Away"	Max Merritt & the Meteors	2	
16.	"SOS"	ABBA	1	1
17.	"Darktown Strutters Ball"	Ted Mulry Gang	3	
18.	"I Hate the Music"	John Paul Young	2	
19.	"Love Really Hurts Without You"	Billy Ocean	3	
20.	"Jeans On"	David Dundas	2	
21.	"If You Leave Me Now"	Chicago	1	1
22.	"December, 1963 (Oh, What a Night)"	The Four Seasons	2	
23.	"I Just Don't Know What to Do with Myself"	Marcia Hines	6	
24.	"Lady Bump"	Penny McLean	9	
25.	"Hold Me Close"	David Essex	2	

These charts are calculated by David Kent of the Kent Music Report and they are based on the number of weeks and position the records reach within the top 100 singles for each week.
