= Ooh Ja Ja =

1977 single by Pussyfoot

Single by Pussyfoot

from the album Pussyfootin' Round... With Love
- B-side: "I Want You to Love Me"
- Released: 1976
- Label: EMI
- Songwriter(s): Mick Flinn
- Producer(s): Mick Flinn

Pussyfoot singles chronology
"The Way That You Do It" (1975)	"Ooh Ja Ja" (1976)	"Sugartime" (1977)

"Ooh Ja Ja" is a song by British recording act Pussyfoot. It was released in Australia in March 1977 as the second single from Pussyfoot's debut studio album, Pussyfootin' Round... With Love. The song peaked at number 20 on the Australian Kent Music Report.

== Track listing ==
7-inch single (EMI-11376)

A. "Ooh Ja Ja"
B. "I Want You to Love Me"

== Charts ==
Chart (1977)	Peak position
Australia (Kent Music Report)	20
