= Donna Jones (singer) =

British singer

Donna Jones (born Doreen Jones, 8 April 1949 in Manchester) is an English performer best known for her work as Pussyfoot in the 1970s, and as a member of the New Seekers since February 1979.

== Music career ==
=== Chrys-Do-Lyns (1963–1965) ===
Jones started her singing career in 1963 as part of an all girl trio called "The Chrys-Do-Lyns" (named after the three members). The trio comprised Christine Lowe, Doreen Jones (Donna Jones), and one-time "New Seeker" Linda Susan Belcher (Lyn Paul). They performed in clubs throughout the UK, and also in Italy, France and Germany before splitting up in 1965.

=== 1965–1972 ===
Jones then went solo. She became resident singer at a Manchester night club, "Mr. Smiths", and subsequently performed in Granada TV's "First Timers" where she was awarded "Best Female Singer". This led to a recording contract with MCA where Jones recorded "Heaven Held".

She met Francine Rees and Rees' husband Roger Walburn singing in the Manchester Mecca club, and they subsequently played as the resident house group at the Manchester club and its sister club in Blackpool. (Rees became a member of The New Seekers in 2002.)

=== Springfield Revival ===
In 1972, Mick Flinn, Ray Martin, and Donna Jones formed the "Springfield Revival". They were extremely successful, appearing on television shows such as Morecambe and Wise, The Two Ronnies, Rolf Harris and many other variety shows in the UK. The group toured the world with The Osmonds, appearing at Madison Square Garden, and performed at the 45th Academy Awards in Hollywood on 27 March 1973.

=== Pussyfoot Era (1975–1980) ===
Jones and Flinn split from Ray Martin and formed a duo using a number of names: Mick and Donna (1975–1976), Donna Jo (1976), and Pussyfoot (1975–1980). For Pussyfoot, Flinn remained behind the scenes, and Jones was marketed as a solo artist. In 1975 they recorded the disco song "The Way That You Do It", which first attracted public attention when the song's suggestive lyrics caused it to be banned by the BBC. In Australia, the television show Countdown began playing the video clip, and exploited the British ban on playing the song. Over several months, Jones became a sensation and a sex symbol. The song was released as a single by EMI Records and spent seven weeks at number one on the singles chart from January 1977. Pussyfoot released two studio albums.

In 1980, Jones fronted a mainly female band (with Flinn on lead guitar) that adopted her previous stage name of Pussyfoot, and the group entered the Song for Europe 1980 contest (a preamble to the Eurovision Song Contest). Pussyfoot came fourth in the contest, with media commentators speculating after the event that Jones was, once again, too raunchy for British tastes. The other members of Pussyfoot at the contest were Fiona Tucker (bass guitar), Jude Allen (synthesizer and keyboards), Jackie Dixon (drums) and Annabel Rees (synthesizer and keyboards).

== Personal life ==
Jones began dance classes at age 3, and appearing in the UK TV soap Coronation Street at age 12.

She married her Springfield Revival partner, Mick Flinn, who also subsequently joined The New Seekers.

She has been known as Doreen Jones; Donna Jones; Pussyfoot; Donna Flinn

=== Mick Flinn ===
Australian born Flinn was a member of The Mixtures who, after back to back number 1 hits in Australia in 1970, released "The Pushbike Song" in the UK where it entered the charts in the top 5, peaking at No. 2 in January 1971.

The Mixtures went to England in January 1971, spending most of 1971 there, and returned to England in 1972. Flinn left The Mixtures in May 1972, eventually settling permanently in the UK. In the UK, Flinn formed The Springfield Revival with Ray Martin and Donna Jones. Flinn subsequently became Jones' manager-writer-producer, and husband.
