= List of number-one albums in Australia during the 1970s =

Australian number-one albums of the 1970s < 1960s 1980s >

Australian top 25 singles
- 1970 1971 1972 1973 1974; 1975 1976 1977 1978 1979

Australian top 25 albums
- 1970 1971 1972 1973 1974; 1975 1976 1977 1978 1979

The following lists the number one albums on the Australian Albums Chart during the 1970s. The source for this decade is the Kent Music Report.

Key
The yellow background indicates the #1 album on the KMR End of Year Chart
The light blue background indicates the #1 album on the KMR End of Decade Chart

== 1970 ==
Date	Artist	Album	Weeks at number one
5 January	The Beatles	Abbey Road	18 weeks
12 January	The Beatles	Abbey Road	18 weeks
19 January	The Beatles	Abbey Road	18 weeks
26 January	The Beatles	Abbey Road	18 weeks
2 February	The Beatles	Abbey Road	18 weeks
9 February	The Beatles	Abbey Road	18 weeks
16 February	The Beatles	Abbey Road	18 weeks
23 February	The Beatles	Abbey Road	18 weeks
2 March	Led Zeppelin	Led Zeppelin II	5 weeks
9 March	Led Zeppelin	Led Zeppelin II	5 weeks
16 March	Led Zeppelin	Led Zeppelin II	5 weeks
23 March	Led Zeppelin	Led Zeppelin II	5 weeks
30 March	Led Zeppelin	Led Zeppelin II	5 weeks
6 April	Simon and Garfunkel	Bridge over Troubled Water	15 weeks
13 April	Simon and Garfunkel	Bridge over Troubled Water	15 weeks
20 April	Simon and Garfunkel	Bridge over Troubled Water	15 weeks
27 April	Simon and Garfunkel	Bridge over Troubled Water	15 weeks
4 May	Simon and Garfunkel	Bridge over Troubled Water	15 weeks
9 May	Simon and Garfunkel	Bridge over Troubled Water	15 weeks
18 May	The Beatles	Hey Jude	2 weeks
25 May	The Beatles	Hey Jude	2 weeks
1 June	Simon and Garfunkel	Bridge over Troubled Water	15 weeks
8 June	Simon and Garfunkel	Bridge over Troubled Water	15 weeks
15 June	The Beatles	Let It Be	4 weeks
22 June	The Beatles	Let It Be	4 weeks
29 June	The Beatles	Let It Be	4 weeks
6 July	The Beatles	Let It Be	4 weeks
13 July	Crosby, Stills, Nash & Young	Déjà Vu	2 weeks
20 July	Crosby, Stills, Nash & Young	Déjà Vu	2 weeks
27 July	Simon and Garfunkel	Bridge over Troubled Water	15 weeks
3 August	Simon and Garfunkel	Bridge over Troubled Water	15 weeks
10 August	Simon and Garfunkel	Bridge over Troubled Water	15 weeks
17 August	Simon and Garfunkel	Bridge over Troubled Water	15 weeks
24 August	Simon and Garfunkel	Bridge over Troubled Water	15 weeks
31 August	Simon and Garfunkel	Bridge over Troubled Water	15 weeks
7 September	Simon and Garfunkel	Bridge over Troubled Water	15 weeks
14 September	Creedence Clearwater Revival	Cosmo's Factory	19 weeks
21 September	Creedence Clearwater Revival	Cosmo's Factory	19 weeks
28 September	Creedence Clearwater Revival	Cosmo's Factory	19 weeks
5 October	Creedence Clearwater Revival	Cosmo's Factory	19 weeks
12 October	Creedence Clearwater Revival	Cosmo's Factory	19 weeks
19 October	Creedence Clearwater Revival	Cosmo's Factory	19 weeks
26 October	Creedence Clearwater Revival	Cosmo's Factory	19 weeks
2 November	Creedence Clearwater Revival	Cosmo's Factory	19 weeks
9 November	Creedence Clearwater Revival	Cosmo's Factory	19 weeks
16 November	Creedence Clearwater Revival	Cosmo's Factory	19 weeks
23 November	Creedence Clearwater Revival	Cosmo's Factory	19 weeks
30 November	Creedence Clearwater Revival	Cosmo's Factory	19 weeks
7 December	Creedence Clearwater Revival	Cosmo's Factory	19 weeks
14 December	Creedence Clearwater Revival	Cosmo's Factory	19 weeks
21 December	Creedence Clearwater Revival	Cosmo's Factory	19 weeks
28 December	Creedence Clearwater Revival	Cosmo's Factory	19 weeks

== 1971 ==
Date	Artist	Album	Weeks at number one
4 January	Creedence Clearwater Revival	Cosmo's Factory	19 weeks
11 January	Creedence Clearwater Revival	Cosmo's Factory	19 weeks
18 January	Creedence Clearwater Revival	Cosmo's Factory	19 weeks
25 January	Led Zeppelin	Led Zeppelin III	4 weeks
1 February	Led Zeppelin	Led Zeppelin III	4 weeks
8 February	Led Zeppelin	Led Zeppelin III	4 weeks
15 February	Led Zeppelin	Led Zeppelin III	4 weeks
22 February	Santana	Abraxas	1 week
1 March	Creedence Clearwater Revival	Pendulum	3 weeks
8 March	Creedence Clearwater Revival	Pendulum	3 weeks
15 March	Creedence Clearwater Revival	Pendulum	3 weeks
22 March	George Harrison	All Things Must Pass	8 weeks
29 March	George Harrison	All Things Must Pass	8 weeks
5 April	George Harrison	All Things Must Pass	8 weeks
12 April	George Harrison	All Things Must Pass	8 weeks
19 April	George Harrison	All Things Must Pass	8 weeks
26 April	George Harrison	All Things Must Pass	8 weeks
3 May	George Harrison	All Things Must Pass	8 weeks
10 May	George Harrison	All Things Must Pass	8 weeks
17 May	Janis Joplin	Pearl	5 weeks
24 May	Janis Joplin	Pearl	5 weeks
31 May	Janis Joplin	Pearl	5 weeks
7 June	Janis Joplin	Pearl	5 weeks
14 June	Janis Joplin	Pearl	5 weeks
21 June	Deep Purple	Deep Purple in Rock	2 weeks
28 June	Deep Purple	Deep Purple in Rock	2 weeks
5 July	Joe Cocker	Cocker Happy	8 weeks
12 July	Joe Cocker	Cocker Happy	8 weeks
19 July	Joe Cocker	Cocker Happy	8 weeks
26 July	The Rolling Stones	Sticky Fingers	2 weeks
2 August	The Rolling Stones	Sticky Fingers	2 weeks
9 August	Joe Cocker	Cocker Happy	8 weeks
16 August	Joe Cocker	Cocker Happy	8 weeks
23 August	Joe Cocker	Cocker Happy	8 weeks
30 August	Daddy Cool	Daddy Who?... Daddy Cool	7 weeks
6 September	Daddy Cool	Daddy Who?... Daddy Cool	7 weeks
13 September	Daddy Cool	Daddy Who?... Daddy Cool	7 weeks
20 September	Daddy Cool	Daddy Who?... Daddy Cool	7 weeks
27 September	Daddy Cool	Daddy Who?... Daddy Cool	7 weeks
4 October	Daddy Cool	Daddy Who?... Daddy Cool	7 weeks
11 October	Daddy Cool	Daddy Who?... Daddy Cool	7 weeks
18 October	Joe Cocker	Cocker Happy	8 weeks
25 October	Joe Cocker	Cocker Happy	8 weeks
1 November	Rod Stewart	Every Picture Tells a Story	5 weeks
8 November	Rod Stewart	Every Picture Tells a Story	5 weeks
15 November	Rod Stewart	Every Picture Tells a Story	5 weeks
22 November	Rod Stewart	Every Picture Tells a Story	5 weeks
29 November	Rod Stewart	Every Picture Tells a Story	5 weeks
6 December	Cat Stevens	Teaser and the Firecat	15 weeks
13 December	Cat Stevens	Teaser and the Firecat	15 weeks
20 December	Cat Stevens	Teaser and the Firecat	15 weeks
27 December	Cat Stevens	Teaser and the Firecat	15 weeks

== 1972 ==
Date	Artist	Album	Weeks at number one
3 January	Cat Stevens	Teaser and the Firecat	15 weeks
10 January	John Lennon	Imagine	2 weeks
17 January	John Lennon	Imagine	2 weeks
24 January	Cat Stevens	Teaser and the Firecat	15 weeks
31 January	Cat Stevens	Teaser and the Firecat	15 weeks
7 February	Cat Stevens	Teaser and the Firecat	15 weeks
14 February	Cat Stevens	Teaser and the Firecat	15 weeks
21 February	Cat Stevens	Teaser and the Firecat	15 weeks
28 February	Cat Stevens	Teaser and the Firecat	15 weeks
6 March	Cat Stevens	Teaser and the Firecat	15 weeks
13 March	Cat Stevens	Teaser and the Firecat	15 weeks
19 March	Cat Stevens	Teaser and the Firecat	15 weeks
27 March	Cat Stevens	Teaser and the Firecat	15 weeks
3 April	Don McLean	American Pie	11 weeks
10 April	Don McLean	American Pie	11 weeks
17 April	Don McLean	American Pie	11 weeks
24 April	Don McLean	American Pie	11 weeks
1 May	Don McLean	American Pie	11 weeks
8 May	Don McLean	American Pie	11 weeks
15 May	Don McLean	American Pie	11 weeks
22 May	Don McLean	American Pie	11 weeks
29 May	Don McLean	American Pie	11 weeks
5 June	Don McLean	American Pie	11 weeks
12 June	Don McLean	American Pie	11 weeks
19 June	Neil Young	Harvest	1 week
26 June	Deep Purple	Machine Head	2 weeks
3 July	Deep Purple	Machine Head	2 weeks
10 July	Jethro Tull	Thick as a Brick	11 weeks
17 July	Jethro Tull	Thick as a Brick	11 weeks
24 July	Jethro Tull	Thick as a Brick	11 weeks
31 July	Jethro Tull	Thick as a Brick	11 weeks
7 August	Jethro Tull	Thick as a Brick	11 weeks
14 August	Jethro Tull	Thick as a Brick	11 weeks
21 August	Jethro Tull	Thick as a Brick	11 weeks
28 August	Jethro Tull	Thick as a Brick	11 weeks
4 September	Jethro Tull	Thick as a Brick	11 weeks
11 September	Jethro Tull	Thick as a Brick	11 weeks
18 September	Jethro Tull	Thick as a Brick	11 weeks
25 September	Slade	Slade Alive!	12 weeks
2 October	Slade	Slade Alive!	12 weeks
9 October	Slade	Slade Alive!	12 weeks
16 October	Slade	Slade Alive!	12 weeks
23 October	Cat Stevens	Catch Bull at Four	7 weeks
30 October	Cat Stevens	Catch Bull at Four	7 weeks
6 November	Cat Stevens	Catch Bull at Four	7 weeks
13 November	Cat Stevens	Catch Bull at Four	7 weeks
20 November	Cat Stevens	Catch Bull at Four	7 weeks
27 November	Cat Stevens	Catch Bull at Four	7 weeks
4 December	Cat Stevens	Catch Bull at Four	7 weeks
11 December	Slade	Slade Alive!	12 weeks
18 December	Slade	Slade Alive!	12 weeks
25 December	Slade	Slade Alive!	12 weeks

== 1973 ==
Date	Artist	Album	Weeks at number one
1 January	Slade	Slade Alive!	12 weeks
8 January	Slade	Slade Alive!	12 weeks
15 January	Slade	Slade Alive!	12 weeks
22 January	Slade	Slade Alive!	12 weeks
29 January	Slade	Slade Alive!	12 weeks
5 February	Slade	Slayed?	6 weeks
12 February	Slade	Slayed?	6 weeks
19 February	Slade	Slayed?	6 weeks
26 February	Slade	Slayed?	6 weeks
5 March	Slade	Slayed?	6 weeks
12 March	Slade	Slayed?	6 weeks
19 March	Carly Simon	No Secrets	6 weeks
26 March	Carly Simon	No Secrets	6 weeks
2 April	Carly Simon	No Secrets	6 weeks
9 April	Carly Simon	No Secrets	6 weeks
16 April	Carly Simon	No Secrets	6 weeks
23 April	Carly Simon	No Secrets	6 weeks
30 April	Elton John	Don't Shoot Me I'm Only the Piano Player	3 weeks
7 May	Elton John	Don't Shoot Me I'm Only the Piano Player	3 weeks
14 May	Elton John	Don't Shoot Me I'm Only the Piano Player	3 weeks
21 May	Neil Diamond	Hot August Night	29 weeks
28 May	Neil Diamond	Hot August Night	29 weeks
4 June	Led Zeppelin	Houses of the Holy	3 weeks
11 June	Led Zeppelin	Houses of the Holy	3 weeks
18 June	Led Zeppelin	Houses of the Holy	3 weeks
25 June	Neil Diamond	Hot August Night	29 weeks
2 July	Neil Diamond	Hot August Night	29 weeks
9 July	Paul McCartney and Wings	Red Rose Speedway	3 weeks
16 July	Paul McCartney and Wings	Red Rose Speedway	3 weeks
23 July	Paul McCartney and Wings	Red Rose Speedway	3 weeks
30 July	Neil Diamond	Hot August Night	29 weeks
6 August	Neil Diamond	Hot August Night	29 weeks
13 August	Neil Diamond	Hot August Night	29 weeks
20 August	Neil Diamond	Hot August Night	29 weeks
27 August	Neil Diamond	Hot August Night	29 weeks
3 September	Neil Diamond	Hot August Night	29 weeks
10 September	Neil Diamond	Hot August Night	29 weeks
17 September	Neil Diamond	Hot August Night	29 weeks
24 September	Neil Diamond	Hot August Night	29 weeks
1 October	Neil Diamond	Hot August Night	29 weeks
8 October	Neil Diamond	Hot August Night	29 weeks
15 October	Neil Diamond	Hot August Night	29 weeks
22 October	Neil Diamond	Hot August Night	29 weeks
29 October	Neil Diamond	Hot August Night	29 weeks
5 November	Neil Diamond	Hot August Night	29 weeks
12 November	Neil Diamond	Hot August Night	29 weeks
19 November	Neil Diamond	Hot August Night	29 weeks
26 November	The Rolling Stones	Goats Head Soup	4 weeks
3 December	The Rolling Stones	Goats Head Soup	4 weeks
10 December	The Rolling Stones	Goats Head Soup	4 weeks
17 December	The Rolling Stones	Goats Head Soup	4 weeks
24 December	Neil Diamond	Hot August Night	29 weeks
31 December	Neil Diamond	Hot August Night	29 weeks

== 1974 ==
Date	Artist	Album	Weeks at number one
7 January	Neil Diamond	Hot August Night	29 weeks
14 January	Neil Diamond	Hot August Night	29 weeks
21 January	Neil Diamond	Hot August Night	29 weeks
28 January	Neil Diamond	Jonathan Livingston Seagull	4 weeks
4 February	Neil Diamond	Jonathan Livingston Seagull	4 weeks
11 February	Neil Diamond	Jonathan Livingston Seagull	4 weeks
18 February	Neil Diamond	Jonathan Livingston Seagull	4 weeks
25 February	Neil Diamond	Hot August Night	29 weeks
4 March	Neil Diamond	Hot August Night	29 weeks
11 March	Neil Diamond	Hot August Night	29 weeks
18 March	Elton John	Goodbye Yellow Brick Road	3 weeks
25 March	Elton John	Goodbye Yellow Brick Road	3 weeks
1 April	Elton John	Goodbye Yellow Brick Road	3 weeks
8 April	Paul McCartney and Wings	Band on the Run	7 weeks
15 April	Paul McCartney and Wings	Band on the Run	7 weeks
22 April	Paul McCartney and Wings	Band on the Run	7 weeks
29 April	Paul McCartney and Wings	Band on the Run	7 weeks
6 May	Paul McCartney and Wings	Band on the Run	7 weeks
13 May	Paul McCartney and Wings	Band on the Run	7 weeks
20 May	Mike Oldfield	Tubular Bells	4 weeks
27 May	Mike Oldfield	Tubular Bells	4 weeks
3 June	Mike Oldfield	Tubular Bells	4 weeks
10 June	Mike Oldfield	Tubular Bells	4 weeks
17 June	Motion Picture Soundtrack	The Sting	7 weeks
24 June	Motion Picture Soundtrack	The Sting	7 weeks
1 July	Motion Picture Soundtrack	The Sting	7 weeks
8 July	Motion Picture Soundtrack	The Sting	7 weeks
15 July	Motion Picture Soundtrack	The Sting	7 weeks
22 July	Motion Picture Soundtrack	The Sting	7 weeks
29 July	Paul McCartney and Wings	Band on the Run	7 weeks
5 August	Motion Picture Soundtrack	The Sting	7 weeks
12 August	Elton John	Caribou	10 weeks
19 August	Elton John	Caribou	10 weeks
26 August	Elton John	Caribou	10 weeks
2 September	Elton John	Caribou	10 weeks
9 September	Elton John	Caribou	10 weeks
16 September	Elton John	Caribou	10 weeks
23 September	Elton John	Caribou	10 weeks
30 September	Elton John	Caribou	10 weeks
7 October	Elton John	Caribou	10 weeks
14 October	Elton John	Caribou	10 weeks
21 October	Suzi Quatro	Quatro	6 weeks
28 October	Suzi Quatro	Quatro	6 weeks
4 November	Suzi Quatro	Quatro	6 weeks
11 November	Suzi Quatro	Quatro	6 weeks
18 November	Suzi Quatro	Quatro	6 weeks
25 November	Suzi Quatro	Quatro	6 weeks
2 December	Neil Diamond	Serenade	7 weeks
9 December	Neil Diamond	Serenade	7 weeks
16 December	Neil Diamond	Serenade	7 weeks
23 December	Neil Diamond	Serenade	7 weeks
30 December	Neil Diamond	Serenade	7 weeks

== 1975 ==
Date	Artist	Album	Weeks at number one
6 January	Neil Diamond	Serenade	7 weeks
13 January	Neil Diamond	Serenade	7 weeks
20 January	Elton John	Elton John's Greatest Hits	5 weeks
27 January	Elton John	Elton John's Greatest Hits	5 weeks
3 February	Elton John	Elton John's Greatest Hits	5 weeks
10 February	Elton John	Elton John's Greatest Hits	5 weeks
17 February	Elton John	Elton John's Greatest Hits	5 weeks
24 February	Skyhooks	Living in the 70's	16 weeks
3 March	Skyhooks	Living in the 70's	16 weeks
10 March	Skyhooks	Living in the 70's	16 weeks
17 March	Skyhooks	Living in the 70's	16 weeks
24 March	Skyhooks	Living in the 70's	16 weeks
31 March	Skyhooks	Living in the 70's	16 weeks
7 April	Skyhooks	Living in the 70's	16 weeks
14 April	Skyhooks	Living in the 70's	16 weeks
21 April	Skyhooks	Living in the 70's	16 weeks
28 April	Skyhooks	Living in the 70's	16 weeks
5 May	Skyhooks	Living in the 70's	16 weeks
12 May	Skyhooks	Living in the 70's	16 weeks
19 May	Skyhooks	Living in the 70's	16 weeks
26 May	Skyhooks	Living in the 70's	16 weeks
2 June	Skyhooks	Living in the 70's	16 weeks
9 June	Skyhooks	Living in the 70's	16 weeks
16 June	Elton John	Captain Fantastic and the Brown Dirt Cowboy	5 weeks
23 June	Elton John	Captain Fantastic and the Brown Dirt Cowboy	5 weeks
30 June	Elton John	Captain Fantastic and the Brown Dirt Cowboy	5 weeks
7 July	Elton John	Captain Fantastic and the Brown Dirt Cowboy	5 weeks
14 July	Elton John	Captain Fantastic and the Brown Dirt Cowboy	5 weeks
21 July	Skyhooks	Ego Is Not a Dirty Word	11 weeks
28 July	Skyhooks	Ego Is Not a Dirty Word	11 weeks
4 August	Skyhooks	Ego Is Not a Dirty Word	11 weeks
11 August	Skyhooks	Ego Is Not a Dirty Word	11 weeks
18 August	Skyhooks	Ego Is Not a Dirty Word	11 weeks
25 August	Skyhooks	Ego Is Not a Dirty Word	11 weeks
1 September	Skyhooks	Ego Is Not a Dirty Word	11 weeks
8 September	Skyhooks	Ego Is Not a Dirty Word	11 weeks
15 September	Skyhooks	Ego Is Not a Dirty Word	11 weeks
22 September	Skyhooks	Ego Is Not a Dirty Word	11 weeks
29 September	Skyhooks	Ego Is Not a Dirty Word	11 weeks
6 October	Sherbet	Sherbet's Greatest Hits	1 week
13 October	Pink Floyd	Wish You Were Here	4 weeks
20 October	Pink Floyd	Wish You Were Here	4 weeks
27 October	Pink Floyd	Wish You Were Here	4 weeks
3 November	Pink Floyd	Wish You Were Here	4 weeks
10 November	John Denver	Windsong	2 weeks
17 November	John Denver	Windsong	2 weeks
24 November	Rod Stewart	Atlantic Crossing	2 weeks
1 December	Rod Stewart	Atlantic Crossing	2 weeks
8 December	ABBA	ABBA	11 weeks
15 December	ABBA	ABBA	11 weeks
22 December	ABBA	ABBA	11 weeks
29 December	ABBA	ABBA	11 weeks

== 1976 ==
Date	Artist	Album	Weeks at number one
5 January	ABBA	ABBA	11 weeks
12 January	ABBA	ABBA	11 weeks
19 January	ABBA	ABBA	11 weeks
26 January	ABBA	ABBA	11 weeks
2 February	ABBA	ABBA	11 weeks
9 February	ABBA	ABBA	11 weeks
16 February	ABBA	ABBA	11 weeks
23 February	Bob Dylan	Desire	3 weeks
1 March	Bob Dylan	Desire	3 weeks
8 March	Bob Dylan	Desire	3 weeks
15 March	Queen	A Night at the Opera	2 weeks
22 March	Queen	A Night at the Opera	2 weeks
29 March	ABBA	The Best of ABBA	16 weeks
5 April	ABBA	The Best of ABBA	16 weeks
12 April	ABBA	The Best of ABBA	16 weeks
19 April	ABBA	The Best of ABBA	16 weeks
26 April	ABBA	The Best of ABBA	16 weeks
3 May	ABBA	The Best of ABBA	16 weeks
10 May	ABBA	The Best of ABBA	16 weeks
17 May	ABBA	The Best of ABBA	16 weeks
24 May	ABBA	The Best of ABBA	16 weeks
31 May	ABBA	The Best of ABBA	16 weeks
7 June	ABBA	The Best of ABBA	16 weeks
14 June	ABBA	The Best of ABBA	16 weeks
21 June	ABBA	The Best of ABBA	16 weeks
28 June	ABBA	The Best of ABBA	16 weeks
5 July	ABBA	The Best of ABBA	16 weeks
12 July	ABBA	The Best of ABBA	16 weeks
19 July	Sherbet	Howzat	2 weeks
26 July	Neil Diamond	Beautiful Noise	4 weeks
2 August	Neil Diamond	Beautiful Noise	4 weeks
9 August	Sherbet	Howzat	2 weeks
16 August	Neil Diamond	Beautiful Noise	4 weeks
23 August	Neil Diamond	Beautiful Noise	4 weeks
30 August	Rod Stewart	A Night on the Town	10 weeks
6 September	Rod Stewart	A Night on the Town	10 weeks
13 September	Rod Stewart	A Night on the Town	10 weeks
20 September	Rod Stewart	A Night on the Town	10 weeks
27 September	Rod Stewart	A Night on the Town	10 weeks
4 October	Rod Stewart	A Night on the Town	10 weeks
11 October	Rod Stewart	A Night on the Town	10 weeks
18 October	Rod Stewart	A Night on the Town	10 weeks
25 October	Rod Stewart	A Night on the Town	10 weeks
1 November	Rod Stewart	A Night on the Town	10 weeks
8 November	Bryan Ferry	Let's Stick Together	2 weeks
15 November	Bryan Ferry	Let's Stick Together	2 weeks
22 November	ABBA	Arrival	8 weeks
29 November	ABBA	Arrival	8 weeks
6 December	ABBA	Arrival	8 weeks
13 December	ABBA	Arrival	8 weeks
20 December	ABBA	Arrival	8 weeks
27 December	ABBA	Arrival	8 weeks

== 1977 ==
Date	Artist	Album	Weeks at number one
3 January	ABBA	Arrival	8 weeks
10 January	ABBA	Arrival	8 weeks
17 January	Eagles	Hotel California	12 weeks
23 January	Eagles	Hotel California	12 weeks
31 January	Eagles	Hotel California	12 weeks
7 February	Eagles	Hotel California	12 weeks
14 February	Eagles	Hotel California	12 weeks
21 February	Eagles	Hotel California	12 weeks
28 February	Eagles	Hotel California	12 weeks
7 March	Eagles	Hotel California	12 weeks
14 March	Eagles	Hotel California	12 weeks
21 March	Eagles	Hotel California	12 weeks
28 March	Eagles	Hotel California	12 weeks
4 April	Eagles	Hotel California	12 weeks
11 April	Fleetwood Mac	Rumours	8 weeks
18 April	Electric Light Orchestra	A New World Record	9 weeks
25 April	Electric Light Orchestra	A New World Record	9 weeks
2 May	Electric Light Orchestra	A New World Record	9 weeks
9 May	Electric Light Orchestra	A New World Record	9 weeks
16 May	Electric Light Orchestra	A New World Record	9 weeks
23 May	Electric Light Orchestra	A New World Record	9 weeks
30 May	Electric Light Orchestra	A New World Record	9 weeks
6 June	Electric Light Orchestra	A New World Record	9 weeks
13 June	Electric Light Orchestra	A New World Record	9 weeks
20 June	Boz Scaggs	Silk Degrees	18 weeks
27 June	Boz Scaggs	Silk Degrees	18 weeks
4 July	Boz Scaggs	Silk Degrees	18 weeks
11 July	Boz Scaggs	Silk Degrees	18 weeks
18 July	Boz Scaggs	Silk Degrees	18 weeks
25 July	Boz Scaggs	Silk Degrees	18 weeks
1 August	Boz Scaggs	Silk Degrees	18 weeks
8 August	Boz Scaggs	Silk Degrees	18 weeks
15 August	Boz Scaggs	Silk Degrees	18 weeks
22 August	Boz Scaggs	Silk Degrees	18 weeks
29 August	Boz Scaggs	Silk Degrees	18 weeks
5 September	Boz Scaggs	Silk Degrees	18 weeks
12 September	Boz Scaggs	Silk Degrees	18 weeks
19 September	Boz Scaggs	Silk Degrees	18 weeks
26 September	Boz Scaggs	Silk Degrees	18 weeks
3 October	Boz Scaggs	Silk Degrees	18 weeks
10 October	Boz Scaggs	Silk Degrees	18 weeks
17 October	Boz Scaggs	Silk Degrees	18 weeks
24 October	Fleetwood Mac	Rumours	8 weeks
31 October	Fleetwood Mac	Rumours	8 weeks
7 November	Fleetwood Mac	Rumours	8 weeks
14 November	Fleetwood Mac	Rumours	8 weeks
21 November	Fleetwood Mac	Rumours	8 weeks
28 November	Rod Stewart	Foot Loose & Fancy Free	9 weeks
5 December	Rod Stewart	Foot Loose & Fancy Free	9 weeks
12 December	Rod Stewart	Foot Loose & Fancy Free	9 weeks
19 December	Rod Stewart	Foot Loose & Fancy Free	9 weeks
26 December	Rod Stewart	Foot Loose & Fancy Free	9 weeks

== 1978 ==
Date	Artist	Album	Weeks at number one
2 January	Rod Stewart	Foot Loose & Fancy Free	9 weeks
9 January	Rod Stewart	Foot Loose & Fancy Free	9 weeks
16 January	Rod Stewart	Foot Loose & Fancy Free	9 weeks
23 January	Rod Stewart	Foot Loose & Fancy Free	9 weeks
30 January	Fleetwood Mac	Rumours	8 weeks
6 February	Fleetwood Mac	Rumours	8 weeks
13 February	Linda Ronstadt	Simple Dreams	5 weeks
20 February	Linda Ronstadt	Simple Dreams	5 weeks
27 February	Linda Ronstadt	Simple Dreams	5 weeks
6 March	Linda Ronstadt	Simple Dreams	5 weeks
13 March	Linda Ronstadt	Simple Dreams	5 weeks
20 March	Motion Picture Soundtrack	Saturday Night Fever	14 weeks
27 March	Motion Picture Soundtrack	Saturday Night Fever	14 weeks
3 April	Motion Picture Soundtrack	Saturday Night Fever	14 weeks
10 April	Motion Picture Soundtrack	Saturday Night Fever	14 weeks
17 April	Motion Picture Soundtrack	Saturday Night Fever	14 weeks
24 April	Motion Picture Soundtrack	Saturday Night Fever	14 weeks
1 May	Motion Picture Soundtrack	Saturday Night Fever	14 weeks
8 May	Motion Picture Soundtrack	Saturday Night Fever	14 weeks
15 May	Motion Picture Soundtrack	Saturday Night Fever	14 weeks
22 May	Motion Picture Soundtrack	Saturday Night Fever	14 weeks
29 May	Motion Picture Soundtrack	Saturday Night Fever	14 weeks
5 June	Motion Picture Soundtrack	Saturday Night Fever	14 weeks
12 June	Motion Picture Soundtrack	Saturday Night Fever	14 weeks
19 June	Motion Picture Soundtrack	Saturday Night Fever	14 weeks
26 June	Meat Loaf	Bat Out of Hell	7 weeks
3 July	Meat Loaf	Bat Out of Hell	7 weeks
10 July	Meat Loaf	Bat Out of Hell	7 weeks
17 July	Meat Loaf	Bat Out of Hell	7 weeks
24 July	Meat Loaf	Bat Out of Hell	7 weeks
31 July	Meat Loaf	Bat Out of Hell	7 weeks
7 August	Meat Loaf	Bat Out of Hell	7 weeks
14 August	Motion Picture Soundtrack	Grease	13 weeks^{1}
21 August	Motion Picture Soundtrack	Grease	13 weeks^{1}
28 August	Motion Picture Soundtrack	Grease	13 weeks^{1}
4 September	Motion Picture Soundtrack	Grease	13 weeks^{1}
11 September	Motion Picture Soundtrack	Grease	13 weeks^{1}
18 September	Motion Picture Soundtrack	Grease	13 weeks^{1}
25 September	Motion Picture Soundtrack	Grease	13 weeks^{1}
2 October	Jeff Wayne	War of the Worlds	7 weeks
9 October	Jeff Wayne	War of the Worlds	7 weeks
16 October	Jeff Wayne	War of the Worlds	7 weeks
23 October	Jeff Wayne	War of the Worlds	7 weeks
30 October	Jeff Wayne	War of the Worlds	7 weeks
6 November	Jeff Wayne	War of the Worlds	7 weeks
13 November	Jeff Wayne	War of the Worlds	7 weeks
20 November	Motion Picture Soundtrack	Grease	13 weeks^{1}
27 November	Motion Picture Soundtrack	Grease	13 weeks^{1}
4 December	Dire Straits	Dire Straits	3 weeks
11 December	Dire Straits	Dire Straits	3 weeks
18 December	Dire Straits	Dire Straits	3 weeks
25 December	Billy Joel	52nd Street	5 weeks

- ^{1} The Grease soundtrack spent nine of its weeks at number one in 1978 (as is shown here), and four in the 1990s—three in 1991 and one in 1998.

== 1979 ==
Date	Artist	Album	Weeks at number one
1 January	Billy Joel	52nd Street	5 weeks
8 January	Billy Joel	52nd Street	5 weeks
15 January	Billy Joel	52nd Street	5 weeks
22 January	Billy Joel	52nd Street	5 weeks
29 January	Rod Stewart	Blondes Have More Fun	6 weeks
5 February	Rod Stewart	Blondes Have More Fun	6 weeks
12 February	Rod Stewart	Blondes Have More Fun	6 weeks
19 February	Rod Stewart	Blondes Have More Fun	6 weeks
26 February	Rod Stewart	Blondes Have More Fun	6 weeks
5 March	Rod Stewart	Blondes Have More Fun	6 weeks
12 March	Bee Gees	Spirits Having Flown	5 weeks
19 March	Bee Gees	Spirits Having Flown	5 weeks
26 March	Bee Gees	Spirits Having Flown	5 weeks
2 April	Bee Gees	Spirits Having Flown	5 weeks
9 April	Bee Gees	Spirits Having Flown	5 weeks
16 April	Supertramp	Breakfast in America	6 weeks
23 April	Supertramp	Breakfast in America	6 weeks
30 April	Supertramp	Breakfast in America	6 weeks
7 May	Supertramp	Breakfast in America	6 weeks
14 May	Supertramp	Breakfast in America	6 weeks
21 May	Supertramp	Breakfast in America	6 weeks
28 May	Bob Seger	The Bob Seger Collection	2 weeks
4 June	Bob Seger	The Bob Seger Collection	2 weeks
11 June	Rickie Lee Jones	Rickie Lee Jones	6 weeks
18 June	Rickie Lee Jones	Rickie Lee Jones	6 weeks
25 June	Rickie Lee Jones	Rickie Lee Jones	6 weeks
2 July	Rickie Lee Jones	Rickie Lee Jones	6 weeks
9 July	Rickie Lee Jones	Rickie Lee Jones	6 weeks
16 July	Rickie Lee Jones	Rickie Lee Jones	6 weeks
23 July	Electric Light Orchestra	Discovery	6 weeks
30 July	Electric Light Orchestra	Discovery	6 weeks
6 August	Leo Sayer	The Very Best of Leo Sayer	1 week
13 August	Electric Light Orchestra	Discovery	6 weeks
20 August	Electric Light Orchestra	Discovery	6 weeks
27 August	Electric Light Orchestra	Discovery	6 weeks
3 September	The Knack	Get the Knack	4 weeks
10 September	The Knack	Get the Knack	4 weeks
17 September	Electric Light Orchestra	Discovery	6 weeks
24 September	The Knack	Get the Knack	4 weeks
1 October	The Knack	Get the Knack	4 weeks
8 October	Bob Dylan	Slow Train Coming	2 weeks
15 October	Bob Dylan	Slow Train Coming	2 weeks
22 October	Eagles	The Long Run	3 weeks
29 October	Eagles	The Long Run	3 weeks
5 November	Eagles	The Long Run	3 weeks
12 November	Rod Stewart	Greatest Hits, Vol. 1	5 weeks
19 November	Rod Stewart	Greatest Hits, Vol. 1	5 weeks
26 November	Rod Stewart	Greatest Hits, Vol. 1	5 weeks
3 December	Rod Stewart	Greatest Hits, Vol. 1	5 weeks
10 December	Rod Stewart	Greatest Hits, Vol. 1	5 weeks
17 December	Bee Gees	Bee Gees Greatest	3 weeks
24 December	Bee Gees	Bee Gees Greatest	3 weeks
31 December	Bee Gees	Bee Gees Greatest	3 weeks

== See also ==
- List of artists who reached number one on the Australian singles chart
- Lists of UK Albums Chart number ones
- Lists of Billboard 200 number-one albums
- Music of Australia
