= List of top 25 albums for 1975 in Australia =

Top 25 albums of 1975 < 1974 1976 >

Other Australian top charts for 1975
- top 25 singles

Australian top 40 charts for the 1980s
- singles
- albums

Australian number-one charts of 1975
- albums
- singles

The following lists the top 25 (end of year) charting albums on the Australian Album Charts, for the year of 1975. These were the best charting albums in Australia for 1975. The source for this year is the "Kent Music Report", known from 1987 onwards as the "Australian Music Report".

#	Title	Artist	Highest pos. reached	Weeks at No. 1
1.	Living in the 70's	Skyhooks	1	16
2.	Just a Boy	Leo Sayer	3	
3.	On the Level	Status Quo	2	
4.	Ego is Not a Dirty Word	Skyhooks	1	11
5.	Captain Fantastic and the Brown Dirt Cowboy	Elton John	1	5
6.	Physical Graffiti	Led Zeppelin	2	
7.	Great Hits! First Impressions	Olivia Newton-John	3	
8.	Venus and Mars	Wings	2	
9.	An Evening with John Denver	John Denver	4	
10.	Elton John's Greatest Hits	Elton John	1	5
11.	Atlantic Crossing	Rod Stewart	1	2
12.	Wish You Were Here	Pink Floyd	1	4
13.	Not Fragile	Bachman-Turner Overdrive	2	
14.	Once Upon a Star	Bay City Rollers	1	7
15.	Quatro	Suzi Quatro	1	6 (pkd #1 in 1974)
16.	Sherbet's Greatest Hits	Sherbet	1	1
17.	Windsong	John Denver	1	2
18.	The Myths and Legends of King Arthur and the Knights of the Round Table	Rick Wakeman	2	
19.	ABBA	ABBA	1	11 (pkd #1 in 1975 & 76)
20.	John Denver's Greatest Hits	John Denver	4	
21.	Welcome to My Nightmare	Alice Cooper	5	
22.	Tommy	Original Soundtrack Recording	6	
23.	The Sweet Singles Album	Sweet	2	
24.	Serenade	Neil Diamond	1	7 (pkd #1 in 1974 & 75)
25.	Back Home Again	John Denver	2	

These charts are calculated by David Kent of the Kent Music Report and they are based on the number of weeks and position the records reach within the top 100 albums for each week.

source: David Kent's "Australian Chart Book 1970-1992"
