= The Way That You Do It =

1975 single by Pussyfoot

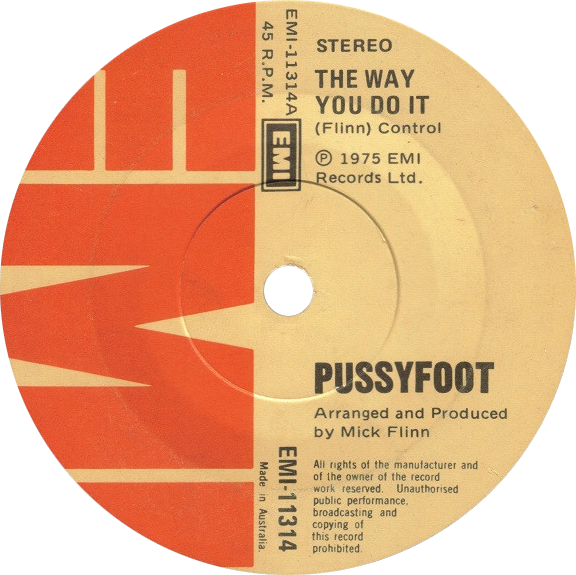
- Side A of the Australian single

Single by Pussyfoot

from the album Pussyfootin' Round... With Love
- B-side: "I Think Like That"
- Released: 1975
- Genre: Soft rock
- Label: EMI
- Songwriter: Mick Flinn
- Producer: Mick Flinn

Pussyfoot singles chronology
"The Way That You Do It" (1975)	"Ooh Ja Ja" (1977)

"The Way That You Do It" is a song by British recording act Pussyfoot. It was released in the United Kingdom in June 1975 as their debut single. The song's suggestive lyrics caused it to be banned by the BBC. The song was re-released under the title "Ooh Na Na Hiya" by Donna Jo, the lead singer of Pussyfoot.

In Australia, music television show Countdown began playing the video clip, and exploited the British ban on playing the song. The song was released by EMI Australia late in 1976 and peaked at number one on the Australia Kent Music Report in January 1977, spending seven weeks at the top spot.

In April 1977, Pussyfoot toured Australia; Gold Coast, Queensland Mayor Sir Bruce Small declined to attend their concert, telling the Gold Coast Bulletin: "The song is obviously intended to be highly suggestive and in my judgment it is pornographic so the fact that it was banned by the BBC speaks for itself. If I could ban it I would and parents should be more aware of the kind of songs their kids are listening to." Pussyfoot lead singer Donna Jones responded saying, "I never sang it as a suggestive song. What it meant was the way a person is attracted to another. If it is dirty then what about the old song 'It’s Not What You Do, it’s the Way You Do It?' I think dirt is in the mind."

== Track listings ==
UK 7-inch single (EMI 2397)

A. "Ooh Na Na Hiya"
B. "I Think I Like It"

Australian 7-inch single (EMI-11314)

A. "The Way That You Do It"
B. "I Think Like That"

== Charts ==
=== Weekly charts ===
Chart (1976–1977)	Peak position
Australia (Kent Music Report)	1

=== Year-end charts ===
Chart (1977)	Position
Australia (Kent Music Report)	2

== See also ==
- List of number-one singles in Australia during the 1970s
- List of top 25 singles for 1977 in Australia
