= List of top 25 albums for 1976 in Australia =

Top 25 albums of 1976 < 1975 1977 >

Other Australian top charts for 1976
- top 25 singles

Australian top 40 charts for the 1980s
- singles
- albums

Australian number-one charts of 1976
- albums
- singles

The following lists the top 25 (end of year) charting albums on the Australian Album Charts, for the year of 1976. These were the best charting albums in Australia for 1976. The source for this year is the "Kent Music Report", known from 1987 onwards as the "Australian Music Report".

#	Title	Artist	Highest pos. reached	Weeks at No. 1
1.	The Best of Abba	ABBA	1	16
2.	A Night on the Town	Rod Stewart	1	10
3.	Abba	ABBA	3	11 (pkd #1 in 1975 & 76)
4.	A Night at the Opera	Queen	1	2
5.	Beautiful Noise	Neil Diamond	1	4
6.	Arrival	ABBA	1	8 (pkd #1 in 1976 & 77)
7.	Their Greatest Hits (1971–1975)	The Eagles	3	
8.	Take It Greasy	Ol' 55	3	
9.	Wings At the Speed of Sound	Wings	2	
10.	Howzat	Sherbet	1	2
11.	Desire	Bob Dylan	1	3
12.	Let's Stick Together	Bryan Ferry	1	2
13.	Alice Cooper Goes to Hell	Alice Cooper	4	
14.	Fleetwood Mac	Fleetwood Mac	3	
15.	T.N.T.	AC/DC	2	
16.	Piano Man	Billy Joel	14	
17.	Atlantic Crossing	Rod Stewart	1	2 (pkd #1 in 1975)
18.	Marcia Shines	Marcia Hines	4	
19.	Changesonebowie	David Bowie	8	
20.	Blue For You	Status Quo	3	
21.	Black and Blue	Rolling Stones	4	
22.	Rock 'N' Roll Music	The Beatles	4	
23.	Chicago X	Chicago	3	
24.	Kiss Alive	Kiss	13	
25.	Frampton Comes Alive	Peter Frampton	8	

These charts are calculated by David Kent of the Kent Music Report and they are based on the number of weeks and position the records reach within the top 100 albums for each week.
