= List of top 25 albums for 1977 in Australia =

Top 25 albums of 1977 < 1976 1978 >

Other Australian top charts for 1977
- top 25 singles

Australian top 40 charts for the 1980s
- singles
- albums

Australian number-one charts of 1977
- albums
- singles

The following lists the top 25 (end of year) charting albums on the Australian Album Charts, for the year of 1977. These were the best charting albums in Australia for 1977. The source for this year is the "Kent Music Report", known from 1987 onwards as the "Australian Music Report".

#	Title	Artist	Highest pos. reached	Weeks at No. 1
1.	Silk Degrees	Boz Scaggs	1	18
2.	A New World Record	Electric Light Orchestra	1	9
3.	Rumours	Fleetwood Mac	1	8 (pkd #1 in 1977 & 78)
4.	Hotel California	The Eagles	1	12
5.	Endless Flight	Leo Sayer	7	
6.	Diamantina Cocktail	Little River Band	2	
7.	Even in the Quietest Moments	Supertramp	5	
8.	In Your Mind	Bryan Ferry	2	
9.	Deceptive Bends	10CC	8	
10.	Footloose and Fancy Free	Rod Stewart	1	9 (pkd #1 in 1977 & 78)
11.	A Star Is Born	Film Soundtrack	3	
12.	Fleetwood Mac	Fleetwood Mac	3	
13.	Frampton Comes Alive	Peter Frampton	8	
14.	A Night on the Town	Rod Stewart	1	10 (pkd #1 in 1976)
15.	Wings Over America	Wings	2	
16.	Works Volume 1	Emerson, Lake & Palmer	6	
17.	Arrival	ABBA	1	8 (pkd #1 in 1976 & 77)
18.	Carole Bayer Sager	Carole Bayer Sager	4	
19.	Animals	Pink Floyd	3	
20.	Evita	Original Recording	6	
21.	I Remember Yesterday	Donna Summer	4	
22.	Book of Dreams	Steve Miller Band	6	
23.	Shining	Marcia Hines	3	
24.	I'm in You	Peter Frampton	4	
25.	Moody Blue	Elvis Presley	3	

These charts are calculated by David Kent of the Kent Music Report and they are based on the number of weeks and position the records reach within the top 100 albums for each week.

source: David Kent's "Australian Chart Book 1970-1992"
