= List of top 25 singles for 1975 in Australia =

Top 25 singles of 1975 < 1974 1976 >

Other Australian top charts for 1975
- top 25 albums

Australian top 40 charts for the 1980s
- singles
- albums

Australian number-one charts of 1975
- albums
- singles

The following lists the top 25 (end of year) charting singles on the Australian Singles Charts, for the year of 1975. These were the best charting singles in Australia for 1975. The source for this year is the "Kent Music Report".

#	Title	Artist	Highest pos. reached	Weeks at No. 1
1.	"Fox on the Run"	Sweet	1	6
2.	"January"	Pilot	1	8
3.	"Mamma Mia"	ABBA	1	10 (pkd #1 in 1975 & 76)
4.	"Summer Love"	Sherbet	1	4
5.	"Horror Movie"	Skyhooks	1	2
6.	"Love Will Keep Us Together"	Captain and Tennille	1	4
7.	"Please Mr. Postman"	The Carpenters	1	5
8.	"The Newcastle Song"	Bob Hudson	1	4
9.	"Before the Next Teardrop Falls"	Freddy Fender	1	1
10.	"Bony Moronie"	Hush	4	
11.	"Paloma Blanca"	George Baker Selection	2	
12.	"Bye Bye Baby"	Bay City Rollers	1	1
13.	"I Do, I Do, I Do, I Do, I Do"	ABBA	1	3
14.	"My Little Angel"	William Shakespeare	1	5
15.	"Down Down"	Status Quo	4	
16.	"Black Superman"	Johnny Wakelin	7	
17.	"The Last Farewell"	Roger Whittaker	3	
18.	"You're My World"	Daryl Braithwaite	1	3
19.	"Ego is not a Dirty Word"	Skyhooks	2	
20.	"I Can Help"	Billy Swan	1	1
21.	"When Will I See You Again"	The Three Degrees	2	
22.	"All My Friends Are Getting Married"	Skyhooks	2	
23.	"Roll Over Lay Down"	Status Quo	3	
24.	"Sailing"	Rod Stewart	2	
25.	"Never Can Say Goodbye"	Gloria Gaynor	3	

These charts are calculated by David Kent of the Kent Music Report and they are based on the number of weeks and position the records reach within the top 100 singles for each week.
