= Live with Friends (song) =

Single by Russell Morris

from the album Wings of an Eagle and Other Great Hits
- B-side: "Alcohol Farm"
- Released: February 1972
- Recorded: Channel 9's TCS Studios
- Genre: Pop rock
- Length: 3:39
- Label: His Master's Voice (Australia); Columbia (New Zealand)
- Songwriters: Russell Morris, Brian Cadd
- Producer: Howard Gable

Russell Morris singles chronology
"Sweet, Sweet Love" (1971)	"Live with Friends" (1972)	"Wings of an Eagle" (1972)

"Live with Friends" is a song recorded by Australian singer Russell Morris and produced by Howard Gable. It was released in February 1972 and peaked at number 13 on the Australian Go-Set chart, becoming Morris's fifth top-twenty single.

== Track listing ==
7" Single

- Side A "Live with Friends" - 3:39
- Side B "Alcohol Farm" - 3:20

== Charts ==
"Live with Friends" was released in February 1972, and peaked at number 13 for the week commencing 20 May 1972.

Chart (1972)	Peak position
Australian Go-Set Chart	13
