= Daytona Demon =

1973 single by Suzi Quatro

Single by Suzi Quatro
- B-side: "Roman Fingers"
- Released: October 19, 1973
- Genre: Hard rock
- Length: 4:02
- Label: Rak
- Songwriter(s): Mike Chapman; Nicky Chinn
- Producer(s): Mike Chapman; Nicky Chinn

Suzi Quatro singles chronology
"48 Crash" (1973)	"Daytona Demon" (1973)	"All Shook Up" (1973)

"Daytona Demon" is the fourth solo single and third UK hit by Suzi Quatro, released in 1973. The song is frequently believed to be a revision of Freddy Cannon's "Tallahassee Lassie" and a reference to Daytona Beach in Florida in which Quatro's lover is equated with a fast car.

"Daytona Demon" was never included on the US or other foreign release of her second album Quatro and remained unavailable in any format in the US until the advent of the CD and numerous compilations in the 1990s. "Daytona Demon" has been a staple of Quatro's numerous hits compilation albums since then. On the 2011 expanded issue of Suzi Quatro, “Daytona Demon” and its B-side "Roman Fingers" were included as bonus tracks.

Following on from two Australian number ones, “Daytona Demon” peaked at number four in the autumn of 1974, but in the UK, where she had also had major success with her previous two singles, the song was a comparatively minor hit, peaking at number 14 late in 1973.

== Charts ==
=== Weekly charts ===
Weekly chart performance for "Daytona Demon"
Chart (1973–1974)	Peak position
Australia (Kent Music Report)	4
Austria (Ö3 Austria Top 40)	11
Belgium (Ultratop 50 Flanders)	26
Belgium (Ultratop 50 Wallonia)	8
Switzerland (Schweizer Hitparade)	3
UK Singles (OCC)	14
West Germany (GfK)	2

=== Year-end charts ===
Year-end chart performance for "Daytona Demon"
Chart (1974)	Rank
Australia (Kent Music Report)	33
