= My Name Means Horse =

Studio album by Ross Ryan
- Released: February 1974
- Recorded: late 1973–early 1974
- Genre: Pop; folk rock
- Length: 43:32
- Label: EMI

Ross Ryan chronology
A Poem You Can Keep (1973)	My Name Means Horse (1974)	After the Applause (1975)

My Name Means Horse is the second album from American-born Australian folk pop singer, Ross Ryan. Its title references a lyric from his hit single, "I Am Pegasus" (September 1973), which appears thereon. The album, issued in February 1974, was Ryan's most successful. It won Most Popular Australian Album at the 1974 TV Week King of Pop Awards. The record was accredited with three gold discs: the first was presented to Ryan by then-Prime Minister, Gough Whitlam.

== Background ==
Well ahead of his album, My Name Means Horse, American-born Australian folk pop singer, Ross Ryan issued a single, in September 1973, "I Am Pegasus", which became his highest charting hit, it reached No. 9 on Go-Set Top 40, staying in the chart from November until May the following year. The album followed in February 1974, its title refers to a line from that single.

It is Ryan's most successful album, which reached No. 3 on Go-Set Australian Albums Top 20; and was accredited as a triple gold record. Then-Australian Prime Minister, Gough Whitlam, presented Ryan with the first of these gold certificates. At the 1974 TV Week King of Pop Awards, My Name Means Horse won Most Popular Australian Album.

== Track listing ==
Track lengths taken from the CD release.

Side A

1. "You Put Me On" (2:26)
2. "Orchestra Ladies" (2:48)
3. "Don't Look to Me" (4:37)
4. "There Is No Pain" (3:07)
5. "Blood On the Microphone" (4:08)
6. "Nobody Waved Goodbye" (5:12)

Side B

1. "I am Pegasus" (4:00)
2. "Battle Song" (5:41)
3. "Edith Child" (3:08)
4. "606" (3:52)
5. "A Jules Song" (1:48)
6. "Sing-Along-Horse-Song" (2:45)

== Charts ==
=== Weekly charts ===
Chart (1974)	Peak position
Australia (Kent Music Report)	3

=== Year-end charts ===
Chart (1974)	Peak position
Australia (Kent Music Report)	21

== Certifications ==
Region	Certification	Certified units/sales
Australia (ARIA)	3× Gold	105,000^{^}
^{^} Shipments figures based on certification alone.
