= The Lord's Prayer (Sister Janet Mead song) =

Single by Janet Mead
- B-side: "Brother Sun and Sister Moon"
- Released: 1973
- Recorded: 1973
- Genre: Rock; contemporary Christian
- Label: Festival, A&M (U.S.)
- Songwriters: Traditional; Arnold Strals
- Producer: Martin Erdman

Sister Janet Mead - Australia singles chronology
"The Lord's Prayer" (1973)	"The Earth is Filled" (1974)

Sister Janet Mead - US singles chronology
"The Lord's Prayer" (1974)	"Take My Hand" (1974)

The Lord's Prayer is a pop rock setting of the Lord's Prayer with music by Arnold Strals recorded in 1973 by the Australian nun Sister Janet Mead. Mead was known for pioneering the use of contemporary rock music in celebrating the Roman Catholic Mass and for her weekly radio programs.

The recording was produced by Martin Erdman and originally released by Festival Records in Australia. After reaching number three on the charts in Australia, it went on to become an international hit, selling nearly three million copies worldwide and making the upper reaches of the pop charts in countries as diverse as Canada, Japan, Brazil, Germany and the United States.

In the United States, The Lord's Prayer was picked up for American distribution by A&M Records (catalogue number 1491, b/w "Brother Sun and Sister Moon"). It was certified gold for sales of one million copies. The single entered the Billboard Hot 100 chart on 23 February 1974, charted for 13 weeks and reached a peak of No. 4 during Holy Week in April. The record also reached No. 2 on the Adult Contemporary singles chart. It made Mead the first Roman Catholic nun to have a hit record in the United States since Jeanne-Paule Marie Deckers ("The Singing Nun"), hit No. 1 with Dominique in late 1963. It also became the only song to hit the Top 10 in which the entire lyrical content originated from the words of the Bible. More specifically, it is the only Top 10 hit with words attributed to Jesus Christ.

== Accolades ==
Mead was nominated for a Grammy for Best Inspirational Performance (although she lost to Elvis Presley's How Great Thou Art) and also became the first Australian artist to sell one million U.S. copies of a record produced in Australia. She donated all of her royalties from the recording's international sales to charity and her record label used their share of the proceeds to build a new state of the art recording studio.

Mead re-recorded The Lord's Prayer in 1999 for her album A Time to Sing.

== Chart history ==
=== Weekly charts ===
Chart (1974)	Peak position
Australia (Kent Music Report)	3
Canada RPM Adult Contemporary	1
Canada RPM Top Singles	3
New Zealand (Listener)	4
U.S. Billboard Hot 100	4
U.S. Billboard Adult Contemporary	2
U.S. Cash Box Top 100	5

=== Year-end charts ===
Chart (1974)	Rank
Australia (Kent Music Report)	11
Canada	52
U.S. Billboard Hot 100	85
U.S. Cash Box	72
U.S. Opus	86

==== Sales certification ====
Region	Certification	Certified units/sales
Australia (ARIA)	Gold	50,000^{^}
^{^} Shipments figures based on certification alone.

== Cover versions ==
Johnny Mathis covered The Lord's Prayer in the style of Sister Janet Mead in 1980. His version was a non-album track and was used as the B-side of his re-recording that year of When a Child Is Born. In 1975 the Society of Friends (Quaker) couple Larry and Mileta Kinser arranged the classic ending onto the song and recorded it (with permission). They sang it nightly and weekly in performances across America in churches, schools, and a wide variety of venues for 10 years.

== Popular culture ==
- Mead's version was covered in the satirical stage musical Disaster!.
- Mead's version was also used in the 2025 fantasy action film Dust Bunny.
