= I Am Pegasus =

Single by Ross Ryan

from the album My Name Means Horse
- B-side: "Country Christine Waltz"
- Released: September 1973
- Recorded: 1973
- Genre: Pop; rock
- Length: 3:25
- Label: EMI
- Songwriter: Ross Ryan
- Producer: Peter Dawkins

Ross Ryan singles chronology
"I Don't Want to Know About It" (1973)	"I Am Pegasus" (1973)	"Orchestra Ladies" (1974)

"I Am Pegasus" is a pop rock song written and recorded by American-Australian singer-songwriter Ross Ryan, which was issued as a single in September 1973 ahead of his third album, My Name Means Horse (February 1974). It was produced by Peter Dawkins for EMI Music Australia, and peaked at No. 2 on the Australian charts.

Ryan told APRAP's Debbie Kruger in March 2002 how he had merged two songs, "One was about the fact that I had just discovered that Ross means horse... also at the time I was having a really disastrous attempt at a relationship with an air hostess... [I was] getting nowhere with them, so I combined them and got a flying horse. And I came up with Pegasus... I looked up all the things that rhymed with Pegasus and I got Dimitrius and Sagittarius." The writing process took the artist about two months and after Dawkins heard it, the producer felt, "it was the obvious single."

== Track listing ==
All track were written by Ross Ryan.

1. I Am Pegasus - 3:25
2. Country Christine Waltz - 4:14

== Charts ==
=== Weekly charts ===
Chart (1974)	Peak position
Australia (Kent Music Report)	2

=== Year-end charts ===
Chart (1974)	Peak position
Australia (Kent Music Report)	14
