= Janet Mead =

Australian Catholic nun (1937–2022)

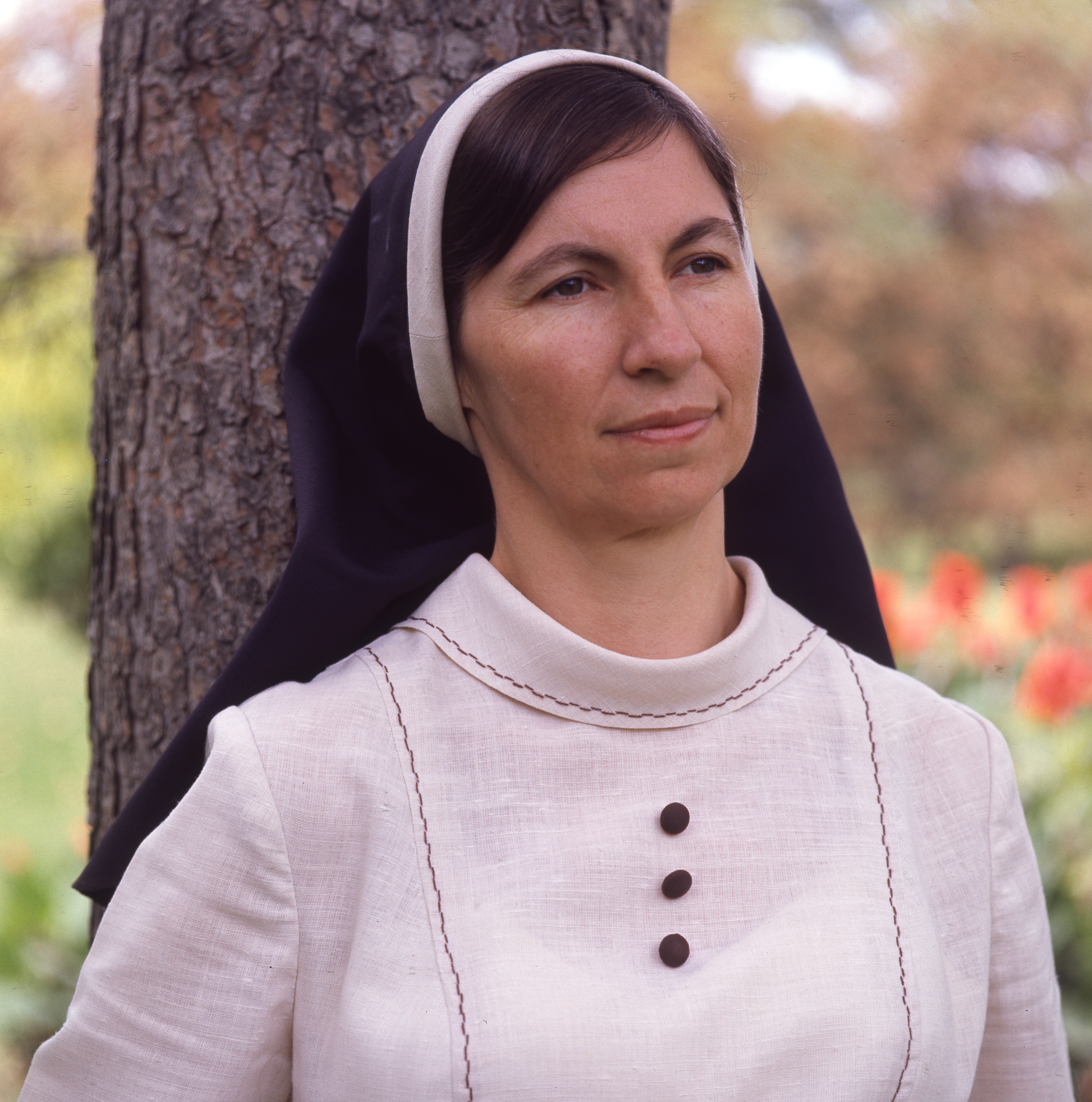
- Mead, c. 1974

Background information
- Also known as: Sister Marietta
- Born: 15 August 1937; Adelaide, South Australia, Australia
- Died: 26 January 2022 (aged 84) Adelaide, South Australia, Australia
- Genre: Christian
- Occupations: religious sister; singer

Janet Mead (15 August 1937 – 26 January 2022) was an Australian religious sister who was best known for recording a pop-rock version of the Lord's Prayer. The surprise hit reached Number 3 on the Australian singles chart (Kent Music Report) in 1974 and Number 4 on the Billboard Hot 100 in the same year. The single earned her a Grammy Award nomination and an Australian Gospel Music Awards in 2004. It sold over one and a half million copies and was awarded a gold disc by the RIAA on 8 April 1974. It was also certified gold in Australia.

Mead became the second woman to have a top 10 single on the Billboard Hot 100 chart whilst a religious sister, Jeanne-Paule Marie Deckers, also called "Sœur Sourire" and "the Singing Nun", had a Number 1 pop hit in 1963 with Dominique.

Mead taught music at St Aloysius College, Adelaide, where the music video for The Lord's Prayer was filmed. After recording, Mead continued to visit the school to teach the junior students basic music.

== Life and career ==
Mead was born in Adelaide, South Australia, in 1937. She formed a band, simply called the Rock Band, when she was 17 to provide music for the weekly Mass at her local church. She studied piano at the Adelaide Conservatorium before joining the Sisters of Mercy order and became a music teacher at two local Catholic schools. She began to explore the "Rock Mass" concept in the early 1970s, desiring to make the Mass more interesting and accessible for her students. This led to a successful series of Rock Masses which she held at St Francis Xavier's Cathedral, Adelaide.

Mead began making professional recordings of her music for schools and churches in 1973. Later that year, she went to Sydney for a recording session with Festival Records produced by Martin Erdman.

Festival asked her to record a cover of the Donovan song "Brother Sun, Sister Moon" which had been written for the soundtrack of the Franco Zeffirelli film of the same name, but Martin Erdman wanted to record a rock arrangement of the Lord's Prayer to serve as the B-side and so a one-hit wonder was born. The single became the first Australian recording to sell over one million copies in the United States, earning a gold record award for Mead and Martin Erdman. Mead donated her share of the royalties to charity while Festival Records used their portion of the proceeds to refit one of their studios.

The success of the single led to the recording of an album, With You I Am, which reached No. 19 in July 1974. Her second album, A Rock Mass, was a complete recording of one of her Rock Masses.

Mead resisted the call to continue her pop career, despite intense media interest. She described the record's success as a "horrible time" in her life – worldwide success brought a pressure that led her to question her faith. Her third album, recorded in 1983, was filed away in the Festival vaults after Mead withdrew from the public eye. The tapes were later rediscovered by Martin Erdman and some tracks, including a new version of The Lord's Prayer, were put together to become the 1999 album A Time To Sing, which was released as part of the 25th anniversary celebrations of the hit single.

Mead did not abandon her love of music and performance and returned to the arts later in life. In 1990, she had a record, A Day Will Come, produced with the conservative Catholic charismatic religious group, the Romero Community. In October 2001, she directed the Romero Company's annual production at the Melbourne Trades Hall Auditorium, an inventive adaptation by Damien Mead of Victor Hugo's Les Misérables.

In 2004, Mead received the Yamaha Golden Gospel Award in recognition of her services to Australian Christian music at the Australian Gospel Music Awards in Canberra. Martin Erdman also received the Yamaha Golden Gospel Award concurrently and presented a short feature film, Sister Janet Mead, at these awards which were coordinated by the Australian Gospel Music Association.

Also in 2004, Mead was named South Australian of the Year for her care of the homeless.

=== Death ===
Janet Mead died from cancer in Adelaide on 26 January 2022, aged 84.

== Discography ==
=== Albums ===
List of albums, with Australian chart positions
Title	Album details	Peak chart positions
Title	Album details	AUS
With You I Am	Released: June 1974; Format: LP; Label: Festival Records (L 35148)	34
A Rock Mass: But I Am Smaller Than My Song	Released: 1975; Format: LP; Label: Festival Records (L 35552)	-
Brand New World	Released: 1983; Format: LP, Cassette; Label: K-Tel (NA648)	46
A Time to Sing	Released: 1999; Format: CD; Label: du Monde	-

=== Singles ===
List of singles, with Australian chart positions
Year	Title	Peak chart positions				Certifications	Album
Year	Title	AUS	CAN	CAN AC	US	Certifications	Album
1973	"The Lord's Prayer"	3	3	1	4	AUS: Gold; US: Gold	With You I Am
1974	"The Earth Is Filled"	-	-	-	-		With You I Am
1974	"Take My Hand"	-	-	-	-		With You I Am
1974	"Hold On" / "Gloria"	-	-	-	-		With You I Am
1975	"I Will Raise Him Up"	-	-	-	-		
1982	"The Lord Is My Shepherd"	-	-	-	-		
