= 48 Crash =

Single by Suzi Quatro

from the album Suzi Quatro
- B-side: "Little Bitch Blue"
- Released: 1973
- Genre: Glam rock; hard rock
- Length: 3:54
- Label: Rak
- Songwriters: Mike Chapman; Nicky Chinn (A-side); Suzi Quatro; Len Tuckey (B-side)
- Producers: Mike Chapman; Nicky Chinn

Suzi Quatro singles chronology
"Can the Can" (1973)	"48 Crash" (1973)	"Daytona Demon" (1973)

"48 Crash" is Suzi Quatro's third solo single and was released after "Can the Can". It was included on her debut album Suzi Quatro (known as Can the Can in Australia). It later appeared as a track on her 1995 album What Goes Around. The single peaked at number three in the UK in July 1973, and number one in Australia for one week. It also hit number two in Germany, and charted well in other European countries.

== Background ==
This Quatro's third solo single was released after she moved from the United States to Britain. In the United States she had already released two singles with all-female band The Pleasure Seekers.

The song "48 Crash" was written and produced by Mike Chapman and Nicky Chinn. The song "Little Bitch Blue" was written by Quatro and Len Tuckey and produced by Mike Chapman and Nicky Chinn.

The song has long been assumed to be about andropause. However, according to the British writer D. J. Taylor, one alternative theory is that, having boasted of their ability to write "a song about anything", Chapman and Chinn were issued with the challenge to come up with a treatment of the 1848 United States economic crisis.

== Charts ==
=== Weekly charts ===
Chart (1973–1974)	Peak position
Australia (Go-Set)	2
Australia (Kent Music Report)	1
Austria (Ö3 Austria Top 40)	6
Belgium (Ultratop 50 Flanders)	18
Canada Top Singles (RPM)	91
Netherlands (Dutch Top 40)	23
Netherlands (Single Top 100)	16
Norway (VG-lista)	5
Switzerland (Schweizer Hitparade)	2
UK Singles (Official Charts)	3
West Germany (GfK)	2

=== Year-end charts ===
Chart (1973)	Position
Australia (Kent Music Report)	50
Switzerland (Schweizer Hitparade)	10

=== Year-end charts ===
Chart (1974)	Peak position
Australia (Kent Music Report)	23

== See also ==
- List of number-one singles in Australia during the 1970s
