= She (Didn't Remember My Name) =

1973 song by Osmosis

Single by Osmosis
- B-side: "Dreamy River"
- Released: 1973
- Recorded: 1973
- Length: 3:14 (7" version); 6:24 (album version)
- Label: Warner Music
- Songwriters: Bill Owen; Enrico Riccardi; Luigi Albertelli
- Producer: Audrey Smith

Osmosis singles chronology
| "She (Didn't Remember My Name)" (1973) | "Rock n Roll Band" (1974) |

"She (Didn't Remember My Name)" is a song and the debut single by Osmosis. It is the English version of "Vado Via" by Drupi. The song peaked at number 2 in Australia.

== Charts ==
=== Weekly charts ===
| Chart (1973–1974) | Peak position |
|---|---|
| Australia (Kent Music Report) | 2 |

=== Year-end charts ===
| Chart (1974) | Rank |
|---|---|
| Australia (Kent Music Report) | 18 |
