= Ross Ryan =

- Ryan in 2008

Background information
- Born: Ross Edwin Ryan; 13 December 1950 (age 75); Fort Leavenworth, Kansas, U.S.
- Origin: Albany, Western Australia, Australia
- Genres: Rock and roll, folk, pop
- Occupations: Singer, songwriter, producer, web designer
- Instruments: Vocals, guitar
- Years active: 1968–present
- Labels: RR, EMI, Capitol, Aztec

Ross Edwin Ryan (born 13 December 1950) is an American-born Australian singer-songwriter and producer. His signature tune, "I Am Pegasus", was released in September 1973, which peaked at No. 2 on the Australian Singles. Its parent album, My Name Means Horse, was released in February 1974, which reached No. 3 on the Australian Album chart.

== Biography ==
=== Early years ===
Ross Ryan was born on 13 December 1950, in Fort Leavenworth, Kansas. The family moved to Mount Manypeaks near Albany, Western Australia in 1959 where they settled on a sheep farm of 3,000 acres (1,200 ha). By the age of 13 years he was writing songs and learning guitar. Ryan attended Albany High, where he took the lead in The Music Man; and he produced a radio program, High School Half Hour, for the local station 6VA. He joined a number of local bands including The Sett and Saffron.

Ryan moved to Perth, undertook an electronics course and worked as an audio operator at a TV station, STW 9. He started his musical career in 1968. From mid-1970 to late 1971 Ryan used the station's facilities to record his debut album, Home Movies, which was self-funded on the RR label. The local Perth radio station 6PM played tracks from his album.

=== 1970s ===
Early in 1972 Ross Ryan issued a split single with his track, "Sounds of Peppermint", as the A side, and The Troupadores' "Keep on Truckin'" on the back. In April it reached the Top 100 on the Kent Music Report Singles Chart. Ryan signed with a manager, Al Maricic, and started regular gigs at Gramps Wine Bar and played at university campuses. In September that year Ryan supported Roy Orbison for the Perth concert on his Australian tour. Ryan got his break when Maricic heard that the proposed support act, comedian Joe Martin, had pulled out in Darwin. After the Perth gig Orbison's promoter booked Ryan for the remainder of the tour.

Ryan signed with EMI Records and commenced his next album, A Poem You Can Keep, with Peter Dawkins producing, which was released in March 1973. By that time Ryan had moved to Sydney. The album was arranged by Peter Martin and engineered by Martin Benge; and was issued on Capitol Records in the United States. In July its lead single, "I Don't Want to Know About It", reached the Top 40 on Go-Set's Singles Chart. Ryan won Record of the Year and Best New Talent at the Australian Record Federation Awards for 1973.

At the end of that year he toured the US playing the club circuit. In Australia Ryan has performed on campus tours, at the Sidney Myer Music Bowl with the Hector Crawford Orchestra, at the Sydney Opera House and at the Sunbury Pop Festival (January 1974). He has supported tours by international acts, The Hollies (May 1973), Helen Reddy (November 1973), Roberta Flack (1977), Michael Franks, Roger Miller and Dr. Hook (1977).

In September 1973 a new single, "I Am Pegasus", was released and became his highest-charting hit, which reached No. 2 on the Australian Kent Music Report chart. Over that time, the single reached No. 1 in almost every state capital, but not at the same time. APRAP's Debbie Kruger interviewed Ryan in 2002 and he explained how he had merged two songs to form "I Am Pegasus":

One was about the fact that I had just discovered that Ross means horse; I’d looked it up in a baby book, and I thought that was really funny ... also at the time I was having a really disastrous attempt at a relationship with an air hostess. It didn't work out, so I was writing a song about that ... I was writing two songs and getting nowhere with them, so I combined them and got a flying horse. And I came up with Pegasus ... I looked up all the things that rhymed with Pegasus and I got Dimitrius and Sagittarius. And of course the Sagittarian's the half-man half-horse.

— Ross Ryan, APRAP, March 2002,

The parent album, My Name Means Horse, was released in February 1974, it is Ryan's most successful album, which reached No. 3 on the Australian Albums chart and was certified triple gold. At the 1974 TV Week King of Pop Awards, My Name Means Horse won Most Popular Australian Album. Then Prime Minister of Australia, Gough Whitlam, presented Ryan's first gold records for the album My Name Means Horse and the single "I am Pegasus". Ryan represented Australia at Expo '74 in Spokane, Washington, with Judy Stone and Rolf Harris.

During the mid-to-late 1970s, Ryan was a guest on various TV shows, including The Paul Hogan Show and Hey Hey It's Saturday. He hosted his own pop TV program, Rock Show, and continued to release albums including After the Applause (June 1975) and Smiling for the Camera (April 1977). Singles from After the Applause, were "Blue Chevrolet Ballerina", released in March 1975, which reached the Top 40 on the Kent Music Report Singles Chart, and "Sedel (Never Smiled at Me)" (August) which did not chart. Smiling for the Camera provided "Happy Birthday to Me" (August 1976), which did not chart. Ryan left EMI and at the end of 1977, they released a compilation album, I Thought This Might Happen 1973 – 77. The following year, Ryan, with Mike Meade (co-host of Flashez), hosted, wrote and acted in a half-hour comedy TV show, Give 'Em Heaps, on Australian Broadcasting Corporation for twenty episodes.

In September 1974, Ryan accompanied Rolf Harris (along with country singer Judy Stone and digeridoo player David Blanasi) to perform at Expo '74 in Spokane, Washington.

=== 1980-1990s ===
Ross Ryan continued songwriting and released independent singles, some of his tracks were covered by other artists including John Farnham who had recorded "I Must Stay" on his 1975 album J.P. Farnham Sings; and Slim Dusty recorded "Isa" which was also used in the bio-pic Slim Dusty: The Movie (1984). In 1988 he performed at the Australian National University.

In 1990, Ryan co-wrote a revue, Les Boys (A Masculine Sensation), with comedians Rod Quantock, Lynda Gibson and Geoff Brooks. In the early 1990s Ryan and Broc O'Connor established a studio, G.I. Recorders, where Ryan was a record producer for acts in a range of music styles including blues with Spectrum, country with Paul Wookey, traditional Irish with The Wren Boys. In 1998 he produced Dale Juner's album, Only Burning Me, which won Victorian Country Album of the Year and Male Vocalist of the Year for Juner. In 1990 EMI, through its budget label, Axis Records released another compilation album, The Greats of Ross 1973–1990, which also included previously unreleased material.

=== 2000 and beyond ===
In October 2003 Ross Ryan issued a new studio album, One Person Queue. Keith Glass of Capital News felt the album was "finely manicured and honed work with an astounding variety of styles and sounds". In addition to his own solo shows across Australia, Ryan supported Carole King during her Australian tour, and was a member of Idol and Idle with Australian Idol judge Mark Holden. Also in October 2003 "I Am Pegasus" was described as a "national anthem" on ABC TV's pop music series Love Is in the Air.

In May 2007, Aztec Music re-released My Name Means Horse on CD format, additional tracks are "Blood on the Microphone (Piña Colada Version)" and "I Am Pegasus" (1974 live version, from Get to Know, an ABC TV show). Plans for future releases include CD versions of the EMI albums, A Poem You Can Keep, After the Applause and Smiling for the Camera. Another compilation album appeared in 2008, The Difficult Third Compilation, distributed by Aztec Music, it includes a new track.

In February 2019, to celebrate 45 years since the release of "My Name Means Horse", Silvan fruit shop 'Carter Bros. Fruit & Veg' ran a social media campaign where they played "My Name Means Horse" on repeat non-stop for 45 days. Ross Ryan appeared in the fruit shop and played a few songs.

== Discography ==
=== Studio albums ===
List of albums, with Australian chart positions
Title	Album details	Peak chart positions	Certification
Title	Album details	AUS	Certification
Homemovies	Released: October 1971; Format: LP; Label: MX-36365	-	
A Poem You Can Keep	Released: March 1973; Format: LP, Cassette; Label: EMI Music (EMC 2501)	22	
My Name Means Horse	Released: February 1974; Format: LP, cassette; Label: EMI Music (EMA-301)	3	AUS: 3× Gold
After the Applause	Released: June 1975; Format: LP, cassette; Label: EMI Music (EMA-313)	35	
Smiling for the Camera	Released: April 1977; Format: LP, cassette; Label: EMI Music (EMC. 2571)	-	
One Person Queue	Released: November 2003; Format: CD; Label: Sound Vault Records (SV0394)	-	

=== Compilations albums ===
Title	Album details
I Thought This Might Happen 1973 – 77	Released: December 1977; Format: LP, Cassette; Label: EMI (EMC 2616)
The Greats of Ross 1973 – 90'	Released: 1990; Format: CD; Label: Axis, EMI (CDAX 701625)
The Difficult Third Compilation	Released: 2008; Format: CD; Label: Coathanger Productions (COAT001)
Stuff (Rarities & Silliness)	Released: 2008; Format: CD; Label: Coathanger Productions (COAT002)

=== Singles ===
List of singles, with Australian chart positions
Year	Title	Peak chart positions	Album
Year	Title	AUS	Album
1972	"Sounds of Peppermint"	97	non album single
1973	"I Don't Want to Know About It"	56	A Poem You Can Keep
1973	"I Am Pegasus"	2	My Name Means Horse
1974	"Orchestra Ladies"	67	My Name Means Horse
1975	"Blue Chevrolet Ballerina"	38	After The Applause
1975	"Sedel (Never Smiled at Me)"	-	After The Applause
1976	"Happy Birthday to Me"	-	Smiling for the Camera
1977	"Who Am I?"	-	Smiling for the Camera
1977	"Dancing"	-	Smiling for the Camera
1980	"Chaplin and Harlow"	-	non album single
1981	"Hello Stranger"	-	non album single
2003	"Cool River"	-	One Person Queue

== Awards and nominations ==
=== King of Pop Awards ===
The King of Pop Awards were voted by the readers of TV Week. The King of Pop award started in 1967 and ran through to 1978.

Year	Nominee / work	Award	Result
1974	My Name Means Horse	Most Popular Australian Album	Won
