= Pussyfoot =

British musical group

- Years active: 1975–1985

Pussyfoot was a British recording act of the late 1970s. The act consisted of songwriter, producer and musician Mick Flinn, and vocalist Donna Jones. Flinn remained behind the scenes, and Jones was marketed as a solo artist.

== Biography ==
=== Early 1970s ===
Flinn had been a member of Australian rock band The Mixtures from 1967 to 1972, which included the band's most successful period. With consecutive number 1 songs in Australia in 1970, "The Pushbike Song" and "In the Summertime". The Mixtures made the trip to England in January 1971, returned to Australia in November for a concert tour, and then returned to England in January 1972. Flinn left the band in May 1972, eventually settling permanently in the UK. In the UK, Flinn formed The Springfield Revival with Ray Martin and Donna Jones. Flinn subsequently became Jones' manager-writer-producer.

=== 1975-1984: Pussyfoot ===
In 1975, Pussyfoot recorded the soft rock song "The Way That You Do It" which was released in June 1975, and first attracted public attention when the song's suggestive lyrics caused it to be banned by the BBC. The song was re-released under the title "Ooh Na Na Hiya" in 1976, but did not chart.

In Australia, the television show Countdown began playing the video clip, and exploited the British ban on playing the song. Over several months, Jones became a sensation and a sex symbol. The song was released as a single by EMI Australia in 1976 and spent seven weeks at number one on the singles chart from 31 January 1977. "The Way That You Do It" was the second highest single in Australia in 1977

"Ooh Ja Ja" was released in Australian 1977 and peaked at number 20 in Australia. Pussyfoot toured Australia in April 1977 promoting their debut studio album, Pussyfootin' Round... With Love.

In 1978, Pussyfoot released a second studio album, featuring the singles ""A Night to Remember" and "Dancer Dance", which reached number three on the British club charts.

Flinn formed the Mick Flinn Band in 1978; Jones joined The New Seekers in 1979.

In 1980, Jones fronted a female band of Fiona Tucker, Jude Allen, Jackie Dixon and Annabel Rees with Mick Flinn on bass that adopted her previous stage name Pussyfoot, and the group entered the Song for Europe 1980 contest, in an attempt to represent the United Kingdom in the Eurovision Song Contest with the song "I Want to Be Me". Pussyfoot came fourth in the contest, with media commentators speculating after the event that Jones was, once again, too raunchy for British tastes.

In 1984, Pussyfoot released The Australian-only single "Mind Over Matter" that failed to chart.

=== 1985-present: Post Pussyfoot ===
Jones returned to The New Seekers in the late 1980s as a replacement for Vivien Banks who had been a member of the 1976 group Co-Co. Jones had previously been in the girl trio Chrys-Do-Lyns along with fellow New Seekers bandmate Lyn Paul.

Flinn worked with Peter Morris of the band Black Lace for the 1984 UK Top 40 hit "Do the Conga", and joined The New Seekers in 2002.

== Discography ==
=== Albums ===
Title	Album details
Pussyfootin' Round... With Love	Released: 1976; Format: LP; Label: EMI Music (EMC.2583)
Pussyfoot	Released: 1978; Format: LP; Label: EMI (EMC.3286)

=== Singles ===
Year	Single	Peak positions	Album
Year	Single	AUS	Album
1975	"The Way That You Do It"	1	Pussyfootin' Round... With Love
1977	"Ooh Ja Ja"	20	Pussyfootin' Round... With Love
1977	"Sugartime"	—	Pussyfootin' Round... With Love
1978	"A Night to Remember"	—	Pussyfoot
1978	"Dancer Dance"/"Baila Bailador"	—	Pussyfoot
1978	"Disco Boogie"	—	Pussyfoot
1979	"Lay Your Love on the Line"	—	non album singles
1980	"I Want to Be Me"	—	non album singles
1984	"Mind Over Matter"	—	non album singles
