= List of top 25 albums for 1971 in Australia =

Top 25 albums of 1971 < 1970 1972 >

Other Australian top charts for 1971
- top 25 singles

Australian top 40 charts for the 1980s
- singles
- albums

Australian number-one charts of 1971
- albums
- singles

The following lists the top 25 (end of year) charting albums on the Australian Album Charts, for the year of 1971. These were the best charting albums in Australia for 1971. The source for this year is the "Kent Music Report", known from 1987 onwards as the "Australian Music Report".

#	Title	Artist	Highest pos. reached	Weeks at No. 1
1.	Cocker Happy	Joe Cocker	1	8
2.	Tea for the Tillerman	Cat Stevens	2	
3.	Mad Dogs and Englishmen	Joe Cocker	3	
4.	Jesus Christ Superstar	Original Studio Recording	6	
5.	All Things Must Pass	George Harrison	1	8
6.	Ram	Paul McCartney & Linda McCartney	3	
7.	Daddy Who? Daddy Cool	Daddy Cool	1	7
8.	Pearl	Janis Joplin	1	5
9.	Pendulum	Creedence Clearwater Revival	1	3
10.	Tapestry	Carole King	3	
11.	Paranoid	Black Sabbath	5	
12.	Abraxas	Santana	1	1
13.	Led Zeppelin III	Led Zeppelin	1	4
14.	Cosmo's Factory	Creedence Clearwater Revival	1	19 (pkd#1 in 1970 & 71)
15.	Deep Purple in Rock	Deep Purple	1	2
16.	Candles in the Rain	Melanie	2	
17.	Every Picture Tells a Story	Rod Stewart	1	5
18.	Sticky Fingers	Rolling Stones	1	2
19.	Aqualung	Jethro Tull	3	
20.	New Morning	Bob Dylan	4	
21.	L.A. Woman	The Doors	9	
22.	John Lennon/Plastic Ono Band	John Lennon/Plastic Ono Band	3	
23.	Bridge Over Troubled Water	Simon and Garfunkel	1	15 (pkd #1 in 1970)
24.	Elton John	Elton John	2	
25.	Tumbleweed Connection	Elton John	4	

These charts are calculated by David Kent of the Kent Music Report and they are based on the number of weeks and position the records reach within the top 100 albums for each week.

source: David Kent's "Australian Chart Book 1970-1992"
