= List of top 25 singles for 1971 in Australia =

Top 25 singles of 1971 < 1970 1972 >

Other Australian top charts for 1971
- top 25 albums

Australian top 40 charts for the 1980s
- singles
- albums

Australian number-one charts of 1971
- albums
- singles

The following lists the top 25 (end of year) charting singles on the Australian Singles Charts, for the year of 1971. These were the best charting singles in Australia for 1971. The source for this year is the "Kent Music Report", known from 1987 onwards as the "Australian Music Report".

#	Title	Artist	Highest pos. reached	Weeks at No. 1
1.	"Eagle Rock"	Daddy Cool	1	10
2.	"My Sweet Lord"	George Harrison	1	8
3.	"The Pushbike Song"	The Mixtures	1	2
4.	"Daddy Cool"	Drummond	1	7
5.	"L.A. International Airport"	Susan Raye	2	
6.	"I Don't Know How to Love Him"	Helen Reddy	2	
7.	"Knock Three Times"	Tony Orlando & Dawn	1	1
8.	"Banks of the Ohio"	Olivia Newton-John	1	5
9.	"Rose Garden"	Lynn Anderson	1	2
10.	"Eleanor Rigby"	Zoot	4	
11.	"Too Young to Be Married"	The Hollies	1	2
12.	"Love is a Beautiful Song"	Dave Mills	2	
13.	"Maggie May"	Rod Stewart	1	4
14.	"I Think I Love You"	The Partridge Family	1	2
15.	"Band Of Gold"	Freda Payne	5	
16.	"It's A Sin To Tell A Lie"	Gerry Monroe	5	
17.	"Me and Bobby McGee"	Janis Joplin	1	2
18.	"I Did What I Did For Maria"	Tony Christie	3	
19.	"Chirpy Chirpy Cheep Cheep"	Lally Stott	1	1
20.	"I Hear You Knockin'"	Dave Edmunds	4	
21.	"Another Day"	Paul McCartney	1	1
22.	"She's A Lady"	Tom Jones	1	2
23.	"Mozart: 1st Movement from Symphony No. 40"	Waldo de Los Rios	2	
24.	"Mamy Blue"	Joël Daydé	3	
25.	"Hot Love"	T. Rex	4	

These charts are calculated by David Kent of the Kent Music Report and they are based on the number of weeks and position the records reach within the top 100 singles for each week.

source: David Kent's "Australian Chart Book 1970-1992"
