= List of top 25 albums for 1973 in Australia =

Top 25 albums of 1973 < 1972 1974 >

Other Australian top charts for 1973
- top 25 singles

Australian top 40 charts for the 1980s
- singles
- albums

Australian number-one charts of 1973
- albums
- singles

The following lists the top 25 (end of year) charting albums on the Australian Album Charts, for the year of 1973. These were the best charting albums in Australia for 1973. The source for this year is the "Kent Music Report", known from 1987 onwards as the "Australian Music Report".

#	Title	Artist	Highest pos. reached	Weeks at No. 1
1.	Hot August Night	Neil Diamond	1	29 (pkd #1 in 1973 & 74)
2.	Red Rose Speedway	Paul McCartney & Wings	1	3
3.	The Dark Side of the Moon	Pink Floyd	2	
4.	Don't Shoot Me I'm Only the Piano Player	Elton John	1	3
5.	Houses of the Holy	Led Zeppelin	1	3
6.	Made in Japan	Deep Purple	3	
7.	No Secrets	Carly Simon	1	6
8.	Seventh Sojourn	The Moody Blues	2	
9.	Tommy	London Symphony Orchestra and Chambre Choir with Guest Soloists	4	
10.	Slayed?	Slade	1	6
11.	The Divine Miss M	Bette Midler	7	
12.	Now & Then	The Carpenters	3	
13.	Living in the Past	Jethro Tull	2	
14.	Slade Alive!	Slade	1	12 (pkd #1 in 1972 & 73)
15.	Who Do We Think We Are	Deep Purple	5	
16.	Never Never Never	Shirley Bassey	4	
17.	Goat's Head Soup	The Rolling Stones	1	4 (pkd #1 in 1973 & 74)
18.	Black Sabbath Vol 4	Black Sabbath	3	
19.	Touch Me	Gary Glitter	11	
20.	Parabrahm	Brian Cadd	6	
21.	Billion Dollar Babies	Alice Cooper	4	
22.	Brian Cadd	Brian Cadd	3	
23.	The Six Wives of Henry VIII	Rick Wakeman	12	
24.	Living in the Material World	George Harrison	2	
25.	Rainbow	Neil Diamond	7	

These charts are calculated by David Kent of the Kent Music Report and they are based on the number of weeks and position the records reach within the top 100 albums for each week.

source: David Kent's "Australian Chart Book 1970-1992"
