= Bongani Baloyi =

South African politician (b. 1987)

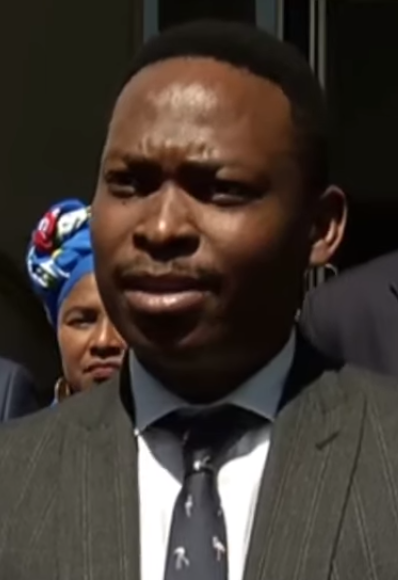
- Baloyi in 2019

President of Xiluva Founder of Xiluva
- In office 30 March 2023 – September 2024
- Preceded by: Party founded
- Succeeded by: Party dissolved

Provincial Chairman of ActionSA in Gauteng
- In office 8 May 2022 – 13 March 2023
- President: Herman Mashaba
- Preceded by: John Moodey

Executive Mayor of the Midvaal Local Municipality
- In office 29 August 2013 – 1 November 2021
- Preceded by: Timothy Nast
- Succeeded by: Peter Teixeira

Personal details
- Born: Bongani Michael Baloyi; 28 February 1987 (age 39) Thokoza, South Africa
- Party: uMkhonto weSizwe (political party) (2024-present)
- Other political affiliations: Xiluva (2023–2024); ActionSA (2022–2023); Democratic Alliance (2005–2021)

Bongani Michael Baloyi (born 28 February 1987) is a South African politician. In 2013, he was elected Executive Mayor of the Midvaal Local Municipality. He was only 26 years old at the time, and he consequently became the youngest mayor in South Africa. From 2011 to 2013, he was the MMC for Development and Planning in the municipality.

== Early life and education ==
Baloyi was born on 28 February 1987 in the Thokoza township outside Alberton in the East Rand. He took an interest in politics at a young age. His grandmother is an active member of the African National Congress Women's League. In 1999, he and his newly-divorced mother Patricia, an entrepreneur, and two siblings moved to Daleside, Meyerton. Baloyi has two incompleted degrees: one in accounting and another one in Business Administration, which he plans to complete in 2022.

== Political career ==
Baloyi became a member of the Democratic Alliance in 2005. He was a member of the Vaal Region Executive Committee, the Provincial Executive Committee and the Federal Council. He was a participant of the DA's Young Leaders Programme.

In 2011, he was elected as a proportional representation councillor of the Midvaal municipality and became the MMC for Development and Planning. Incumbent mayor Timothy Nast resigned in July 2013 following his appointment to the Gauteng Planning Commission. Baloyi was chosen as his successor and took office on 29 August 2013. He won a full term as mayor in August 2016.

Under Baloyi's leadership, Midvaal achieved seven consecutive unqualified audits. The municipality went from being the 16th best-performing municipality in 2013 to the 5th best in the national rankings. In March 2020, he announced that he would not seek another term as mayor in 2021. Baloyi had been mentioned as a possible DA leadership candidate. His term as Executive Mayor came to an end on 1 November 2021.

In December 2021, Baloyi resigned from the DA. He stated that he had left out of his "own agency" and denied that he was being purged.

=== Career in ActionSA ===
Baloyi joined ActionSA in January 2022. Baloyi said that he had applied to be the party's premier candidate in the 2024 provincial election. In an interview with the Sunday Times in late-January 2022, Baloyi said that he had left the DA because the DA became "extremely toxic" after former party leader Helen Zille was elected chairperson of the party's Federal Council in October 2019. Baloyi was promoted to provincial chairperson of the party in May 2022 after John Moodey was appointed the party's national director of operations.

Baloyi resigned from ActionSA in March 2023 due to irreconcilable differences between him and party leadership. He had declined an offer to become party spokesperson and a member of the party's Senate.

=== Formation of Xiluva ===
On 30 March 2023, Baloyi announced he would be registering his own political party, Xiluva, which would be contesting the national and provincial elections in 2024.

In the 2024 South African general election, Xiluva failed to win any seats, receiving 0.02% of the vote in the national ballot.

In September 2024, Baloyi joined MK and stated that he would be deregistering Xiluva.

== Incidents ==
Baloyi and an ANC member were arrested on 29 September 2018 after laying assault charges against one another, following an incident at an Arbor Day event in Savannah City. He was released on bail and his assault case was later withdrawn.

Political offices
Preceded by Timothy Nast	Executive Mayor of the Midvaal Local Municipality; 2013–2021	Succeeded by Peter Teixeira
