= Klip River (Gauteng) =

Klip River Kliprivier
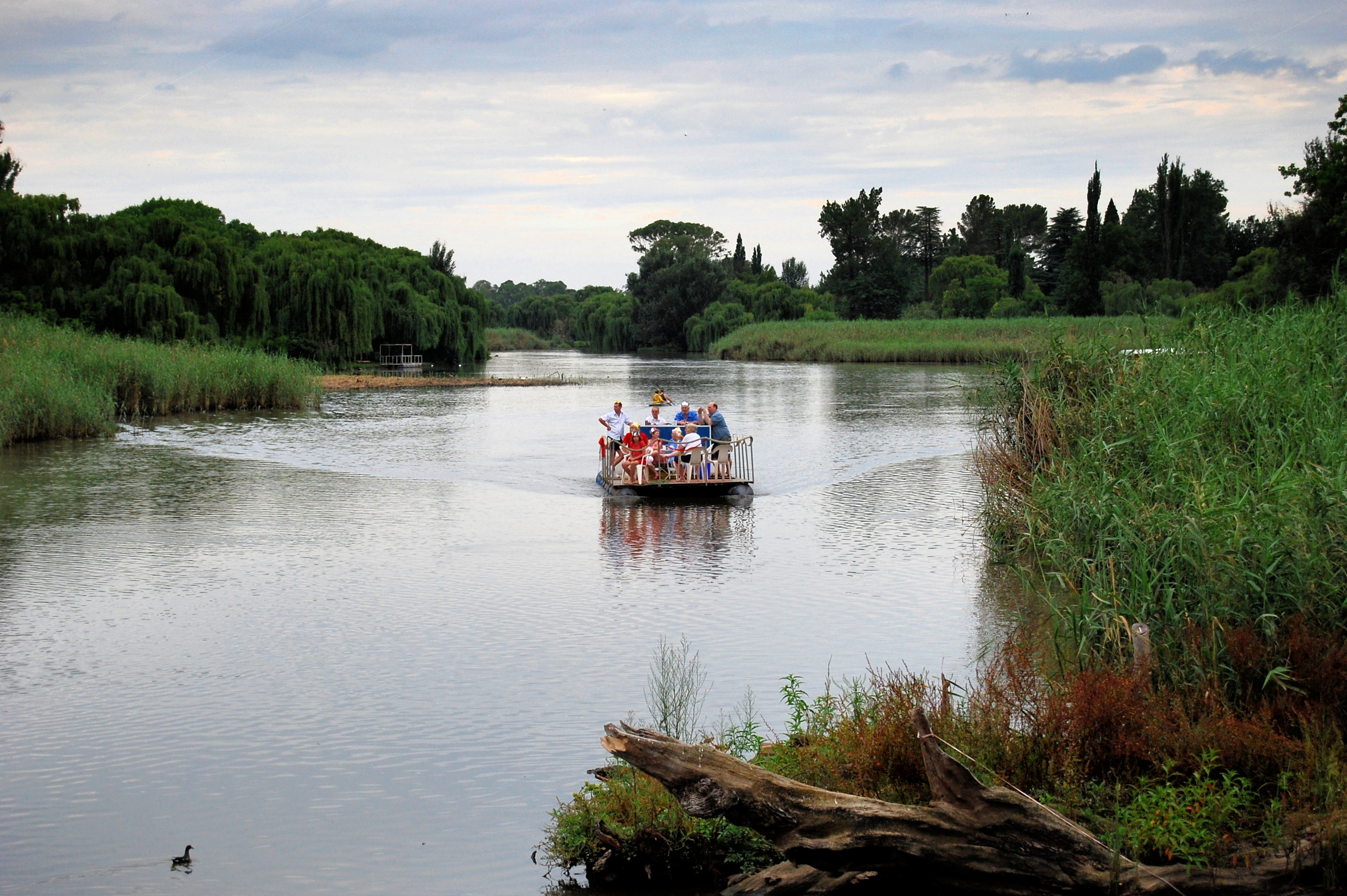

- Location within Gauteng

Location
- Country: South Africa
- Province: Gauteng

Physical characteristics
- Mouth: Vaal River at Vereeniging
  - coordinates: 26°40′15″S 27°57′15″E
  - elevation: 1,414 m (4,639 ft)

The Klip River (or in Afrikaans: Kliprivier, lit. 'Stone river') is the main river draining the portion of Johannesburg south of the Witwatersrand, and its basin includes the Johannesburg CBD and Soweto. The mouth of the river is at Vereeniging where it empties into the Vaal River, which is a tributary to the Orange River. Besides Vereeniging, other towns along the river include Henley on Klip, Lenasia and Meyerton.

== The Kidson Weir ==
The Kidson Weir is a weir located in the village of Henley on Klip on the Klip river in South Africa, and was named after Fenning Kidson, the grandson of an 1820 settler.

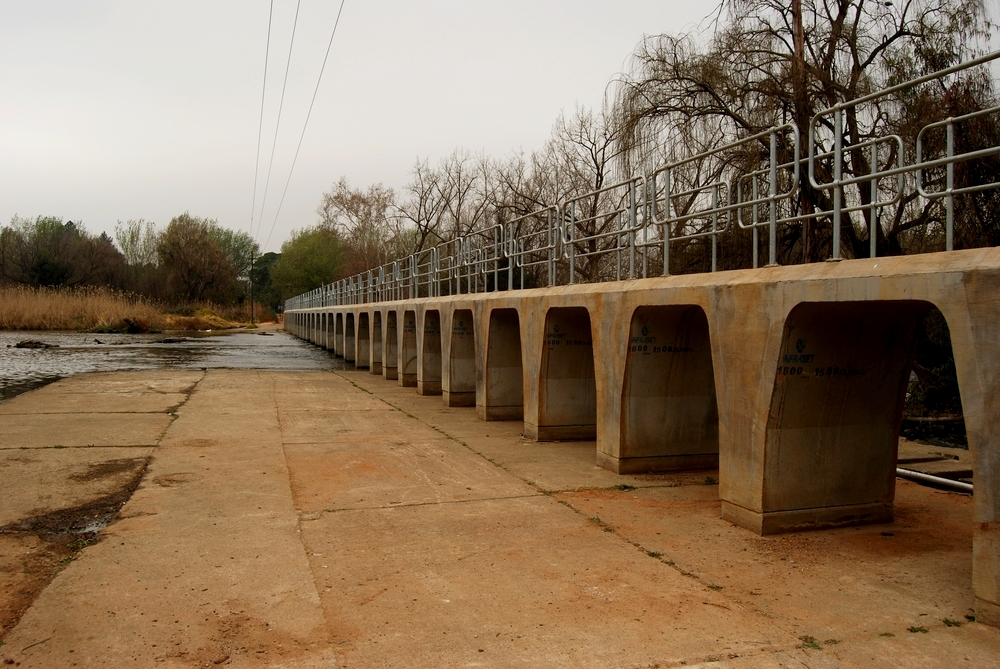
Kidson Weir - Henley on Klip

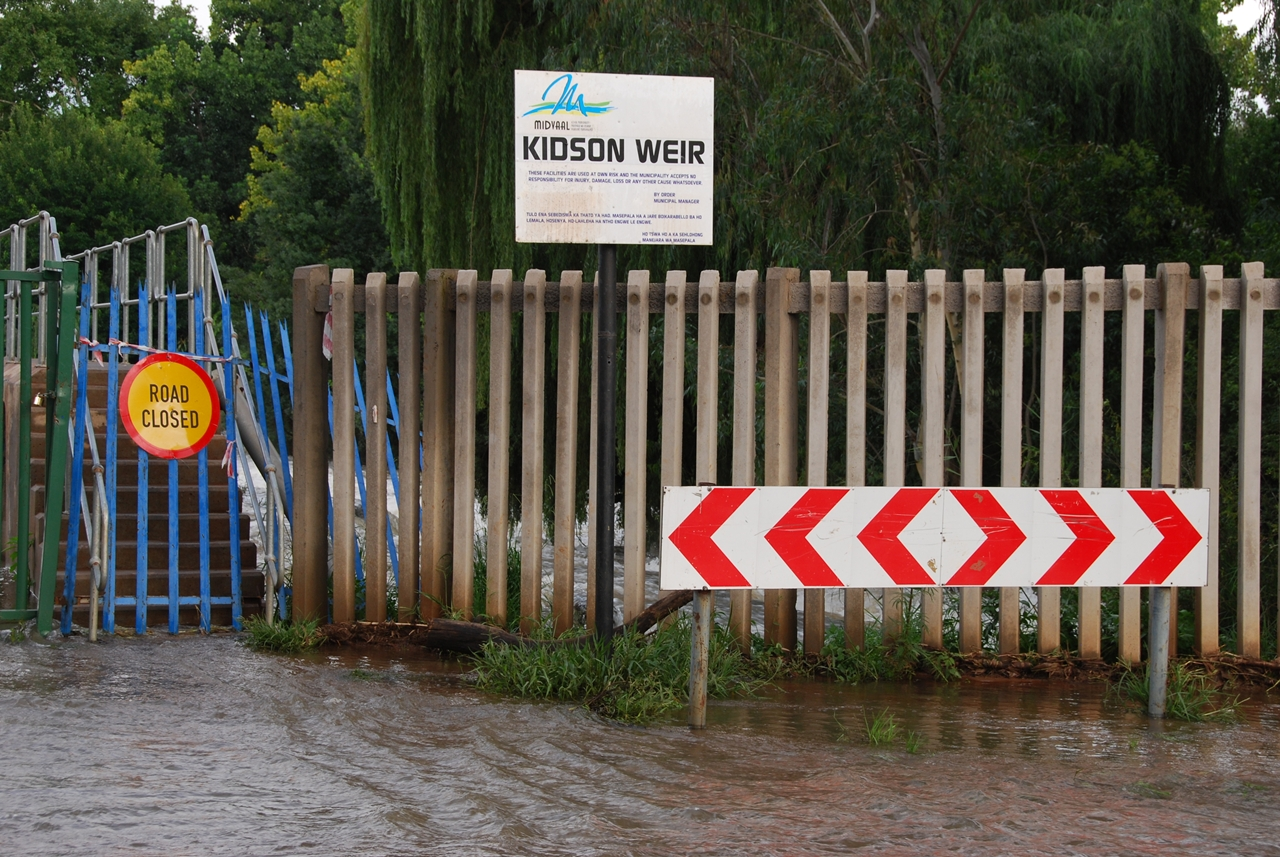
Flooding at the Kidson Weir - January 2010

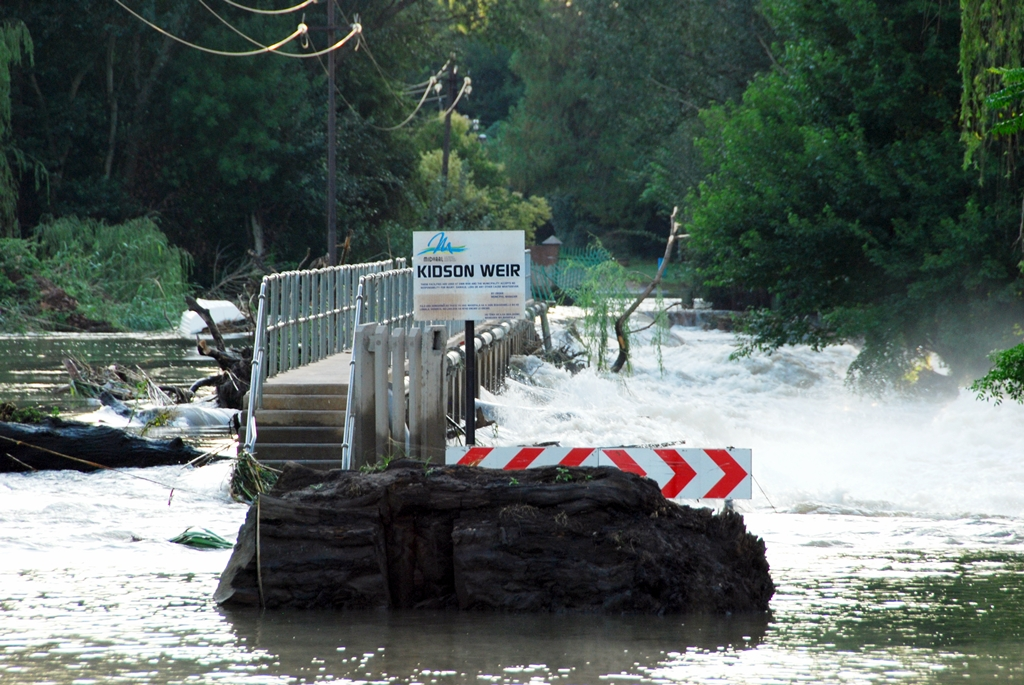
Flooding at the Kidson Weir - December 2010

=== History ===
Fenning was educated in England, but returned to South Africa as a young man and became a transport rider, a contemporary of Sir Percy FitzPatrick. Soon after the outbreak of the Anglo Boer War, news came to Kidson that a commando was on his way to his farm to arrest him. Under the noses of the Boers he escaped, riding sidesaddle, his burly frame crammed into his wife’s riding habit. He finally made his way to Natal, but returned to the Transvaal after the war, settling in Henley on Klip with his wife, Edith. The family home was named Tilham, which is the manor house on the river at the corner of Regatta and Shillingford Roads.

=== Today ===
In December 2010, the village of Henley on Klip experienced heavy floods, after which, it was decided to do some work on improving the weir. In January 2012 work has started on the repairs to the pipes on the western side of the weir. In March 2012 plans were being drawn up to build a new bridge across the weir.

== Environmental concerns ==
The wetland ecosystem of the Klip River in Lenasia, Soweto and surrounding areas have been found to have high levels of polycyclic aromatic hydrocarbons (PAHs) caused by agricultural and industrial runoff and urban waste. Reports in 2016 and in 2025 have shown high levels of PAHs in fish, vertebrates, plant life, and in soil sediments that pose a risk to human health. Zebrafish embryos have suffered severe malformations, delayed hatching and an 80% mortality rate.

== See also ==
- List of rivers of South Africa
- Jukskei River
