= List of top 25 singles for 1970 in Australia =

Top 25 singles of 1970 < 1969 1971 >

Other Australian top charts for 1970
- top 25 albums

Australian number-one charts of 1970
- albums
- singles

The following lists the top 25 (end of year) charting singles on the Australian Singles Charts, for the year of 1970. These were the best charting singles in Australia for 1970. The source for this year is the "Kent Music Report", known from 1987 onwards as the "Australian Music Report".

#	Title	Artist	Highest pos. reached	Weeks at No. 1
1.	"Let It Be"	The Beatles	1	6
2.	"(They Long to Be) Close to You"	The Carpenters	1	3
3.	"In The Summertime"	The Mixtures	1	6
4.	"Spirit in the Sky"	Norman Greenbaum	1	5
5.	"Bridge Over Troubled Water"	Simon and Garfunkel	2	
6.	"Lookin' Out My Back Door" / "Long As I Can See The Light"	Creedence Clearwater Revival	1	4
7.	"El Cóndor Pasa"	Simon and Garfunkel	1	1
8.	"Up Around the Bend" / "Run Through The Jungle"	Creedence Clearwater Revival	1	6
9.	"Knock Knock Who's There"	Liv Maessen	1	1
10.	"Raindrops Keep Fallin' on My Head"	Johnny Farnham	1	7
11.	"Whole Lotta Love"	Led Zeppelin	1	2
12.	"Love Grows (Where My Rosemary Goes)"	Edison Lighthouse	2	
13.	"Cottonfields"	Beach Boys	1	1
14.	"Travelin' Band" / "Who'll Stop The Rain"	Creedence Clearwater Revival	4	
15.	"The Wonder of You"	Elvis Presley	3	
16.	"In the Summertime"	Mungo Jerry	1	1
17.	"A Song of Joy"	Miguel Ríos	1	4
18.	"Spill the Wine"	Eric Burdon and War	2	
19.	"Venus"	Shocking Blue	1	2
20.	"Old Man Emu"	John Williamson	4	
21.	"Everything is Beautiful"	Ray Stevens	1	2
22.	"Lay Down (Candles in the Rain)"	Melanie	2	
23.	"Smiley"	Ronnie Burns	2	
24.	"Two Little Boys"	Rolf Harris	7	
25.	"I Thank You"	Lionel Rose	2	

These charts are calculated by David Kent of the Kent Music Report and they are based on the number of weeks and position the records reach within the top 100 singles for each week.
