= Henley on Klip =

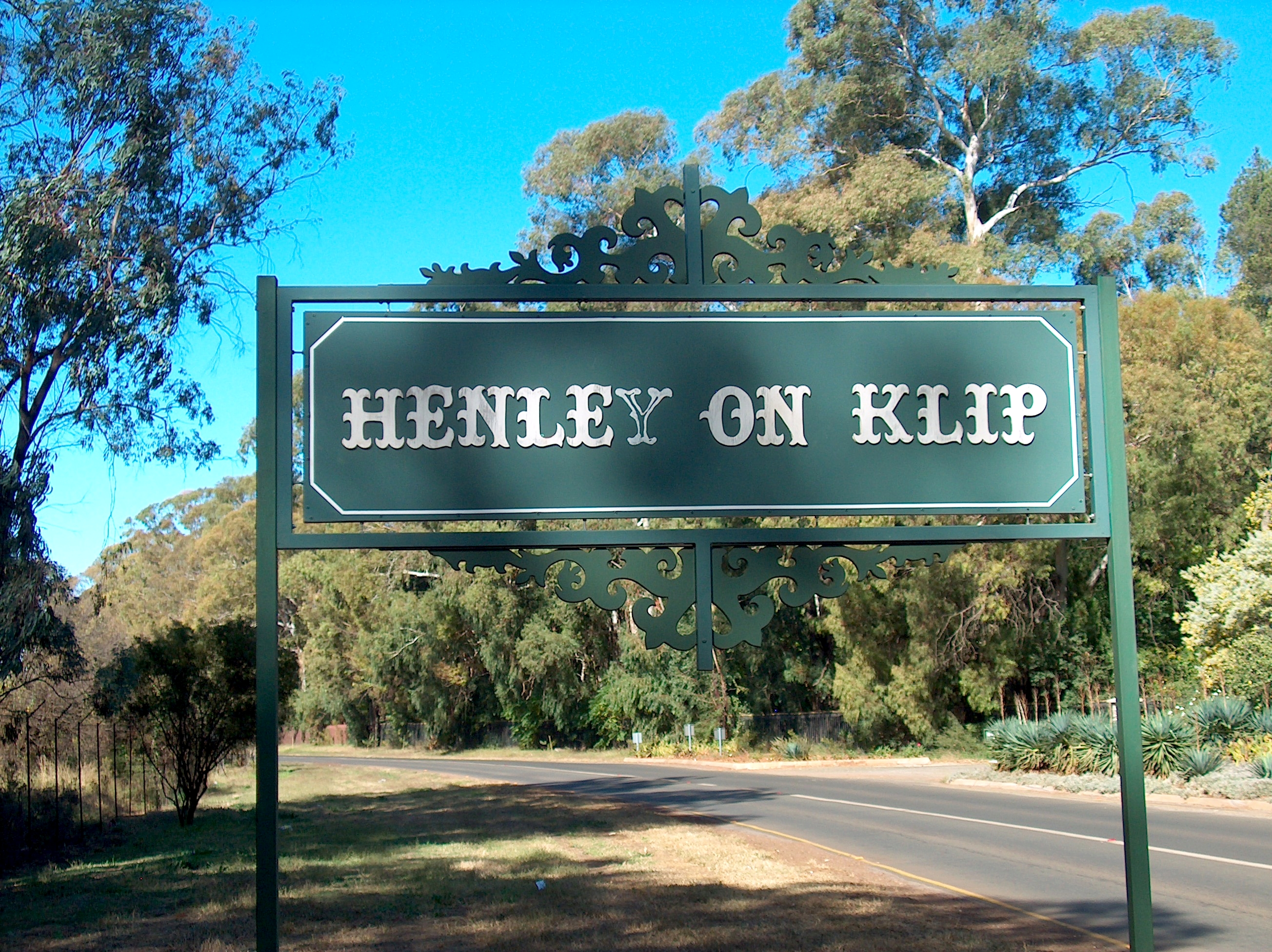

- Location within Gauteng Location within South Africa Location within Africa
- Coordinates: 26°32′7″S 28°03′40″E
- Country: South Africa
- Province: Gauteng
- District: Sedibeng
- Municipality: Midvaal
- Established: 1904

Area
  - Total: 11.37 km^{2} (4.39 sq mi)

Population (2011)
  - Total: 5,874
  - Density: 516.6/km^{2} (1,338/sq mi)

Racial makeup (2011)
  - Black African: 40.2%
  - Coloured: 2.4%
  - Indian/Asian: 1.5%
  - White: 55.6%
  - Other: 0.4%

First languages (2011)
  - English: 41.9%
  - Afrikaans: 27.9%
  - Zulu: 9.8%
  - Sotho: 7.8%
  - Other: 12.6%
- Time zone: UTC+2 (SAST)
- Postal code (street): 1961
- PO box: 1962
- Area code: 016

Henley on Klip is a town in Midvaal Local Municipality in Gauteng, South Africa. It is situated next to Highbury off exit 27 on the R59 along the Klip River between Johannesburg and Vereeniging.

== History ==
The village was founded in 1904, by Advocate Horace Kent. Born in 1855 in Henley on Thames, England, Kent came to South Africa in 1898. The area where Henley on Klip is located reminded Kent of his hometown in England, Henley on Thames. Kent, in conjunction with the Small Farms Company (SFC), bought the land from a Mr Van Der Westhuizen for a price of 5000 pounds, and the land was divided into smallholdings from 0.4 to 30 hectares (1 to 80 acres).

In 1904, the SFC decided to build the Kidson Weir on the Klip River in Henley on Klip. The weir was named after Fenning Kidson, the grandson of an 1820 settler. Fenning was educated in England, but returned to South Africa as a young man and became a transport rider, a contemporary of Sir Percy Fitzpatrick. Soon after the outbreak of the Anglo Boer War, news came to Kidson that a commando was on his way to his farm to arrest him. Under the noses of the Boers he escaped, riding sidesaddle, his burly frame crammed into his wife's riding habit. He finally made his way to Natal, but returned to the Transvaal after the war, settling in Henley on Klip with his wife, Edith. The family home was named Tilham, which is the manor house on the river at the corner of Regatta and Shillingford Roads.

== Schools ==
There are four schools and home schooling tutor centres in the village.

- Oprah Winfrey Leadership Academy for Girls
- Henley Primary School
- Assemblies of God (AOG) College
- Hope Christian Academy
- Orchards Academy (Impaq Centre)
- Nicholas Bhengu Theological College (A non-denominational college established in 1991 and named after Reverend Nicholas Hepworth Bhengu of the Assemblies of God is headquartered in the Assemblies of God Conference Center, Henley on Klip)

== 1970 bus accident ==
At 14:15 on 28 January 1970, a schoolbus stalled on a level crossing and was hit by a passenger train; 23 children were killed and 16 were injured. Johan le Roux, a matric scholar at Hoërskool Dr. Malan in Meyerton, saved two children by pushing them out of a bus window before the train hit the bus, and he died in the accident.

== Notable people ==
- Kai Luke Brümmer, actor
