= Xiluva =

South African political party

- President: Bongani Baloyi
- Founder: Bongani Baloyi
- Founded: March 30, 2023; 2 years ago
- Split from: ActionSA
- Ideology: Communitarianism

Website
- xiluva.org.za

Xiluva (from the Tsonga word meaning "flower") was a South African political party launched in March 2023 by former ActionSA Gauteng provincial chairperson, and former Executive Mayor of the Midvaal Local Municipality for the Democratic Alliance, Bongani Baloyi.

== Formation ==
On 13 March 2023, Bongani Baloyi, who had been the provincial chairperson of ActionSA in Gauteng since May 2022, resigned from the party, after he had a fallout with party president Herman Mashaba over Mashaba's intention to remove him as provincial chairperson and appoint him as national spokesperson. Baloyi, then together with former ActionSA caucus leader in the Ekurhuleni, Tlhogi Moseki, announced the formation of Xiluva, which translates to "flower" in Xitsonga, at a press briefing in Johannesburg on 30 March 2023. Baloyi said that the party was founded on the principles of ubuntu, multiracialism and family values and aims to attract people between the ages of 18 and 48.

The party was officially registered with Independent Electoral Commission of South Africa in July 2023, and Baloyi said that the party intends on contesting the 2024 national and provincial elections. In late-July 2023, Moseki, who had been serving as the party's national chairperson, resigned from the party after he had a fallout with Baloyi and joined Abel Tau's The Transformation Alliance party.

== Election results ==
=== National Assembly elections ===
Election	Party leader	Total votes	Share of vote	Seats	+/–	Government
2024	Bongani Baloyi	2,592	0.02% (Note: From 2024, seats in the National Assembly are determined by a combination of the national ballot, and the nine regional ballots. Only the national ballot figures are shown here.)	0 / 400	New	Extra-parliamentary

=== Provincial elections ===
Election	Gauteng	
Election	%	Seats
2024	0.02%	0/80

== Deregistration ==
The party failed to win any seats in the 2024 South African general election. In September 2024, Baloyi announced that he was joining MK and that he would be deregistering Xiluva.
