= Abbey Road =

1969 studio album by the Beatles

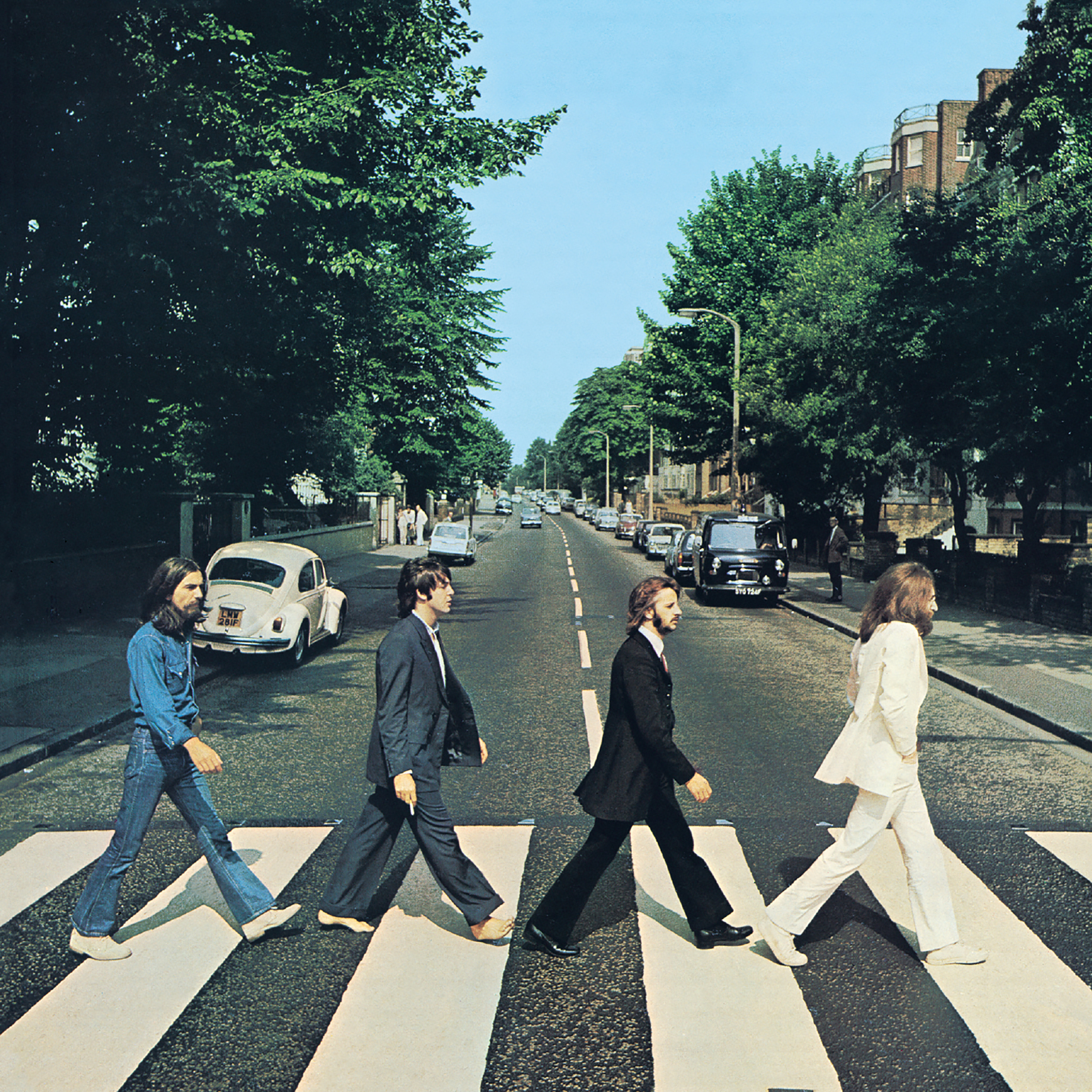

Studio album by the Beatles
- Released: 26 September 1969
- Recorded: 22 February – 20 August 1969
- Studios: EMI, Olympic and Trident, London
- Genres: Rock; pop
- Length: 47:03
- Label: Apple
- Producer: George Martin

The Beatles chronology
Yellow Submarine (1969)	Abbey Road (1969)	Let It Be (1970)

The Beatles North American chronology
Yellow Submarine (1969)	Abbey Road (1969)	Hey Jude (1970)

Singles from Abbey Road
- 1. "Something" / "Come Together" Released: 6 October 1969

Abbey Road is the eleventh studio album by the English rock band the Beatles, released on 26 September 1969 by Apple Records. It is the last album the group recorded – although Let It Be had mostly been recorded earlier, its release was delayed due to production issues. Abbey Road was mostly recorded in April, July and August 1969, and topped the record charts in both the United States and the United Kingdom. A double A-side single from the album, "Something" / "Come Together", was released in October, which also topped the charts in the US.

Abbey Road incorporates styles such as rock, pop, blues, and progressive rock, and makes prominent use of the Moog synthesiser and guitar played through a Leslie speaker unit. It is also notable for having a long medley of songs on side two that have subsequently been covered as one suite by other notable artists. The album was recorded in a more congenial atmosphere than the Get Back / Let It Be sessions earlier in the year, but there were still significant confrontations within the band, particularly over Paul McCartney's song "Maxwell's Silver Hammer", and John Lennon was absent on several tracks. By the time the album was released, Lennon had already left the group, though it was not made public until McCartney also quit the following year upon the release of Let It Be.

Abbey Road was an instant commercial success, eventually selling over 30 million copies worldwide, making it one of the best-selling albums. However, it received mixed reviews upon release; some critics found its music inauthentic and criticised the perceived artificial elements of the production. Critical reception improved in the following years, and the album is now widely regarded as one of the Beatles' best and one of the greatest albums of all time. George Harrison's two songs on the album, "Something" and "Here Comes the Sun", are considered among the best he wrote for the group. The album's cover, featuring the Beatles walking across the zebra crossing outside Abbey Road Studios (then officially named EMI Studios), is one of the most famous and imitated in music history.

== Background ==
After completing the recording sessions for the proposed Get Back album, Paul McCartney suggested to producer George Martin that the group get together and make an album "the way we used to do it", free of the conflict during sessions for The Beatles (also known as the "White Album"). Martin agreed, but on the strict condition that all the group – particularly John Lennon – allow him to produce the record in the same manner as earlier albums and that discipline would be adhered to.

Many traditional works of Beatles scholarship agree that when working on Abbey Road, the four Beatles knew their time as a band was moving towards divorce. (Note: For example, Ian MacDonald writes in Revolution in the Head (2005) that the group, conscious of their fate, gave their assent for the medley mostly to close their career together with a majestic ending, a celebration.) However, this account has been disproven; during a taped meeting in October 1969, after the album had come out, the group mulled over strategies for how they could bridle their songwriting differences—Lennon suggested releasing new music, and McCartney wished for them to work together as they always had—yet all to no avail. Still, some people close to the Beatles had their suspicions. The sound engineer Alan Parsons, who worked on the album, wrote in the foreword to Solid State (2019): "I also knew that, realistically speaking, Abbey Road would be the last time the Beatles would be the Beatles." George Martin too sensed an unmistakable end to their partnership, and Ethan Russell gathered from the photoshoots for the album cover that "they were not a happy group". While he did not know for sure, George Harrison said that "it felt as if we were reaching the end of the line".

== Production ==
=== Recording history ===
The first sessions for Abbey Road began on 22 February 1969, only three weeks after the Get Back sessions, in Trident Studios. There, the group recorded a backing track for "I Want You (She's So Heavy)" with Billy Preston accompanying them on Hammond organ. No further group recording occurred until April because of Ringo Starr's commitments on the film The Magic Christian. After a small amount of work that month and a session for "You Never Give Me Your Money" on 6 May, the group took an eight-week break before restarting it on 2 July. Recording continued through July and August, and the last backing track, for "Because", was taped on 1 August. Overdubs continued through the month, with the final sequencing of the album coming together on 20 August – the last time all four Beatles were present in a studio together.

McCartney, Starr and Martin have reported positive recollections of the sessions, while Harrison said, "we did actually perform like musicians again". Lennon and McCartney had enjoyed working together on the non-album single "The Ballad of John and Yoko" in April, sharing friendly banter between takes, and some of this camaraderie carried over to the Abbey Road sessions. Nevertheless, there was a significant amount of tension in the group. According to Ian MacDonald, McCartney had an acrimonious argument with Lennon during the sessions. Lennon's wife Yoko Ono had become a permanent presence at Beatles recordings, and clashed with other members. Halfway through recording in June, Lennon and Ono were involved in a car accident. A doctor told Ono to rest in bed, so Lennon had one installed in the studio so she could observe the recording process from there.

During the sessions, Lennon expressed a desire to have all of his songs on one side of the album, and McCartney's on the other. The album's two halves represented a compromise: Lennon wanted a traditional release with distinct and unrelated songs, while McCartney and Martin wanted to continue their thematic approach from Sgt. Pepper's Lonely Hearts Club Band by incorporating a medley. Lennon ultimately said that he disliked Abbey Road as a whole and felt that it lacked authenticity, calling McCartney's contributions "[music] for the grannies to dig" and not "real songs", and describing the medley as "junk ... just bits of songs thrown together".

=== Technical aspects ===
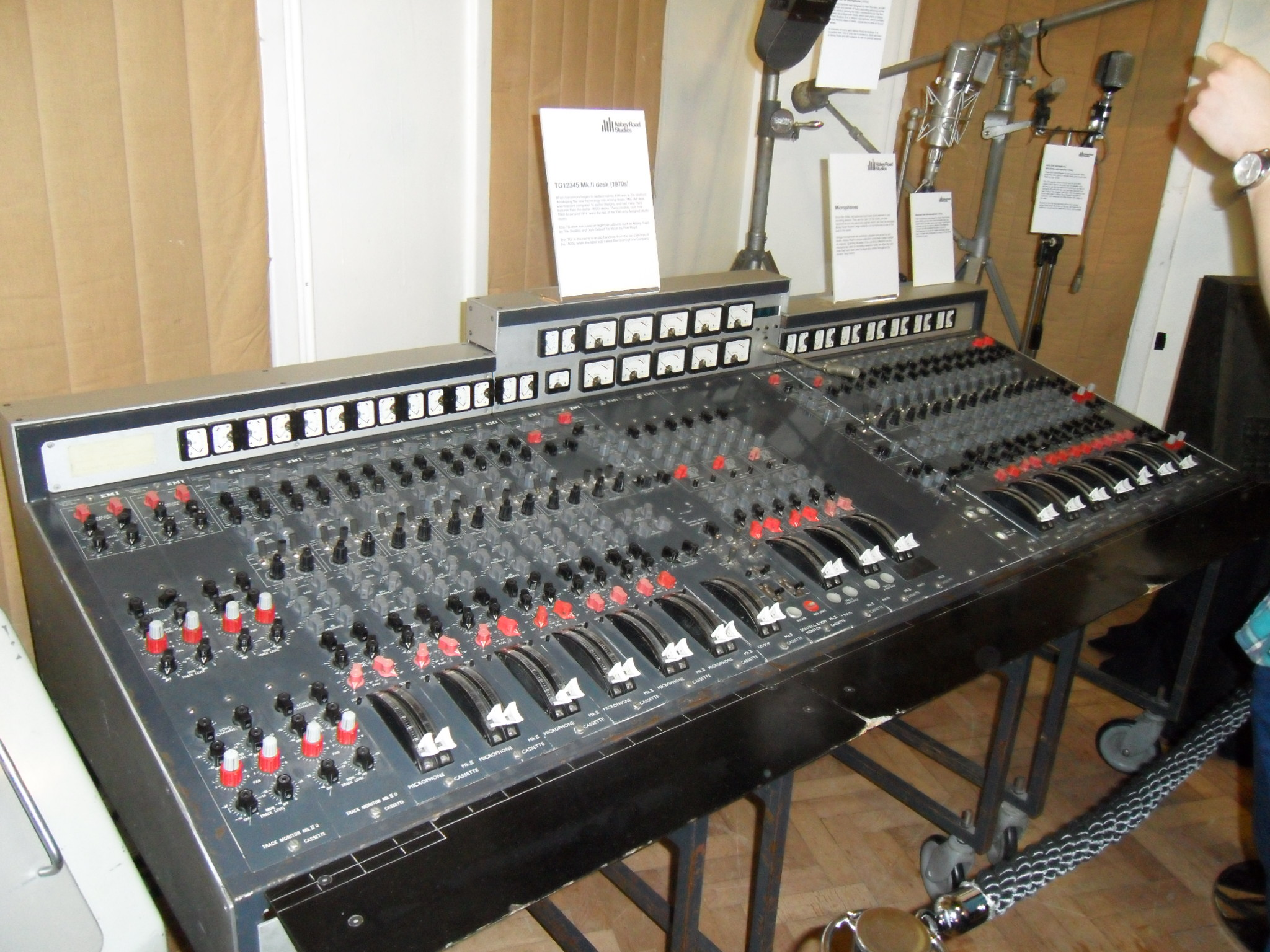
An EMI TG mixing desk, similar to this one, was used in the production of Abbey Road.

Abbey Road was recorded on eight-track reel-to-reel tape machines rather than the four-track machines that were used for earlier Beatles albums such as Sgt Pepper, and was the first Beatles album not to be issued in mono anywhere in the world. The album makes prominent use of guitar played through a Leslie speaker, and of the Moog synthesiser. The Moog is not merely used as a background effect but sometimes plays a central role, as in "Because", where it is used for the middle eight. It is also prominent on "Maxwell's Silver Hammer" and "Here Comes the Sun". The synthesiser was introduced to the band by Harrison, who acquired one in November 1968 and used it to create his album Electronic Sound. Starr made more prominent use of the tom-toms on Abbey Road, later saying the album was "tom-tom madness ... I went nuts on the toms."

Abbey Road was also the only Beatles album to be entirely recorded through a solid-state transistor mixing desk, the TG12345 Mk I, as opposed to earlier tube (thermionic valve)-based REDD desks. The TG console also allowed better support for eight-track recording, facilitating the Beatles' considerable use of overdubbing. Geoff Emerick recalls that the TG desk used to record the album had individual limiters and compressors on each audio channel and noted that the overall sound was "softer" than the earlier tube (valve) desks. In his study of the role of the TG12345 in the Beatles' sound on Abbey Road, the music historian Kenneth Womack observes that "the expansive sound palette and mixing capabilities of the TG12345 enabled George Martin and Geoff Emerick to imbue the Beatles' sound with greater definition and clarity. The warmth of solid-state recording also afforded their music with brighter tonalities and a deeper low end that distinguished Abbey Road from the rest of their corpus, providing listeners with an abiding sense that the Beatles' final long-player was markedly different."

Alan Parsons worked as an assistant engineer on the album. He later went on to engineer Pink Floyd's landmark album The Dark Side of the Moon and produce many popular albums himself with the Alan Parsons Project. John Kurlander also assisted on many of the sessions, and went on to become a successful engineer and producer, most noteworthy for his success on the scores for the Lord of the Rings film trilogy.

== Songs ==
=== Side one ===
==== "Come Together" ====
"Come Together" was an expansion of "Let's Get It Together", a song Lennon originally wrote for Timothy Leary's California gubernatorial campaign against Ronald Reagan. A rough version of the lyrics for "Come Together" was written at Lennon's and Ono's second bed-in event in Montreal.

The biographer Jonathan Gould suggested that the song has only a single "pariah-like protagonist" and Lennon was "painting another sardonic self-portrait". MacDonald has suggested that the "juju eyeballs" has been claimed to refer to Dr John and "spinal cracker" to Ono. The song was later the subject of a lawsuit brought against Lennon by Morris Levy because the opening line in "Come Together" – "Here come old flat-top" – was admittedly lifted from a line in Chuck Berry's "You Can't Catch Me". A settlement was reached in 1973 in which Lennon promised to record three songs from Levy's publishing catalogue for his next album.

"Come Together" was later released as a double A-side single with "Something". In the liner notes to the compilation album Love, Martin described the track as "a simple song but it stands out because of the sheer brilliance of the performers".

==== "Something" ====
Harrison was inspired to write "Something" during sessions for the White Album by listening to his label-mate James Taylor's "Something in the Way She Moves" from his album James Taylor. After the lyrics were refined during the Let It Be sessions (tapes reveal Lennon giving Harrison some songwriting advice during its composition), the song was initially given to Joe Cocker, but was subsequently recorded for Abbey Road. Cocker's version appeared on his album Joe Cocker! that November.

"Something" was Lennon's favourite song on the album, and McCartney considered it the best song Harrison had written. Frank Sinatra once commented that it was "the greatest love song ever written". Lennon contributed piano to the recording and while most of the part was removed, traces of it remain in the final cut, notably on the middle eight, before Harrison's guitar solo.

The song was issued as a double A-side single with "Come Together" in October 1969 and topped the US charts for one week, becoming the Beatles' first number-1 single that was not a Lennon–McCartney composition. It was also the first Beatles single from an album already released in the UK. (Note: In the 1960s, UK record industry protocol was that singles did not normally appear on albums.) Apple's Neil Aspinall filmed a promotional video, which combined separate footage of the Beatles and their wives.

==== "Maxwell's Silver Hammer" ====
"Maxwell's Silver Hammer", McCartney's first song on the album, was first performed by the Beatles during the Let It Be sessions (as seen in the film). He wrote the song after the group's trip to India in 1968 and wanted to record it for the White Album, but it was rejected by the others as "too complicated".

The recording was fraught with tension between band members, as McCartney annoyed others by insisting on a perfect performance. The track was the first Lennon was invited to work on following his car accident, but he hated it and declined to do so. According to engineer Geoff Emerick, Lennon said it was "more of Paul's granny music" and left the session. He spent the next two weeks with Ono and did not return to the studio until the backing track for "Come Together" was laid down on 21 July. Harrison was also tired of the song, saying "we had to play it over and over again until Paul liked it. It was a real drag". Starr was more sympathetic to the song. "It was granny music", he admitted, "but we needed stuff like that on our album so other people would listen to it". Longtime roadie Mal Evans played the anvil sound in the chorus. This track also makes use of Harrison's Moog synthesiser, played by McCartney.

==== "Oh! Darling" ====
"Oh! Darling" was written by McCartney in a doo-wop style, like contemporary work by Frank Zappa. It was tried at the Get Back sessions, and a version appears on Anthology 3. (Note: In the version released on Anthology 3, Lennon can be heard singing the lead on an ad-libbed verse regarding the news that Yoko Ono's divorce from her previous husband Anthony Cox had been finalised.) It was subsequently re-recorded in April, with overdubs in July and August.

McCartney attempted recording the lead vocal only once a day. He said: "I came into the studios early every day for a week to sing it by myself because at first my voice was too clear. I wanted it to sound as though I'd been performing it on stage all week." Lennon thought he should have sung it, remarking that it was more his style.

==== "Octopus's Garden" ====
As was the case with most of the Beatles' albums, Starr sang lead vocal on one track. "Octopus's Garden" is his second and last solo composition released on any album by the band. It was inspired by a trip with his family to Sardinia aboard Peter Sellers's yacht after Starr left the band for two weeks during the sessions for the White Album. Starr received a full songwriting credit and composed most of the lyrics, although the song's melodic structure was partly written in the studio by Harrison. The pair would later collaborate as writers on Starr's solo singles "It Don't Come Easy", "Back Off Boogaloo" and "Photograph".

==== "I Want You (She's So Heavy)" ====
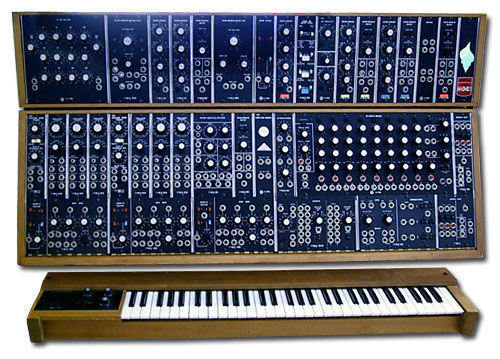
John Lennon played the Moog synthesiser's white noise generator to create the "wind" sounds at the end of "I Want You (She's So Heavy)".

"I Want You (She's So Heavy)" was written by Lennon about his relationship with Ono, and he made a deliberate choice to keep the lyrics simple and concise. Author Tom Maginnis writes that the song had a progressive rock influence, with its unusual length and structure, repeating guitar riff, and white noise effects, though he noted the "I Want You" section has a straightforward blues structure.

The finished song is a combination of two different recording attempts. The first attempt occurred in February 1969, almost immediately after the Get Back / Let It Be sessions with Billy Preston. This was subsequently combined with a second version made during the Abbey Road sessions proper in April. The two sections together ran to nearly eight minutes, making it the Beatles' second-longest released track. (Note: At 8:22, "Revolution 9" is the longest track to appear on a Beatles album.) Lennon used Harrison's Moog synthesiser with a white noise setting to create a "wind" effect that was overdubbed on the second half of the track. During the final edit, Lennon told Emerick to "cut it right there" at 7 minutes and 44 seconds, creating a sudden, jarring silence that concludes the first side of Abbey Road (the recording tape would have run out within 20 seconds as it was). The final mixing and editing of the track occurred on 20 August 1969, the last day on which all four Beatles were together in the studio.

=== Side two ===
==== "Here Comes the Sun" ====
"Here Comes the Sun" was written by Harrison in Eric Clapton's garden in Surrey during a break from stressful band business meetings. The basic track was recorded on 7 July 1969. Harrison sang lead and played acoustic guitar, McCartney provided backing vocals and played bass, and Starr played the drums. Lennon was still recovering from his car accident and did not perform on the track. Martin provided an orchestral arrangement in collaboration with Harrison, who overdubbed a Moog synthesiser part on 19 August, immediately before the final mix.

Though not released as a single, the song attracted attention and critical praise, and was included on the compilation 1967–1970. It has been featured several times on BBC Radio 4's Desert Island Discs, having been chosen by Sandie Shaw, Jerry Springer, Boris Johnson and Elaine Paige. The Daily Telegraph's Martin Chilton said it was "almost impossible not to sing along to". Since digital downloads have become eligible to chart, it reached number 56 in 2010 after the Beatles' back catalogue was released on iTunes.

Harrison recorded a guitar solo for this track that did not appear in the final mix. It was rediscovered in 2012, and footage of Martin and Harrison's son Dhani listening to it in the studio was released on the DVD of Living in the Material World.

==== "Because" ====
"Because" was inspired by Lennon listening to Ono playing Ludwig van Beethoven's "Moonlight Sonata" on the piano. He recalled he was "lying on the sofa in our house, listening to Yoko play ... Suddenly, I said, 'Can you play those chords backward?' She did, and I wrote 'Because' around them." The track features three-part harmonies by Lennon, McCartney and Harrison, which were then triple-tracked to give nine voices in the final mix. The group considered the vocals to be some of the hardest and most complex they attempted. Harrison played the Moog synthesiser, and Martin played the harpsichord that opens the track.

==== Medley ====
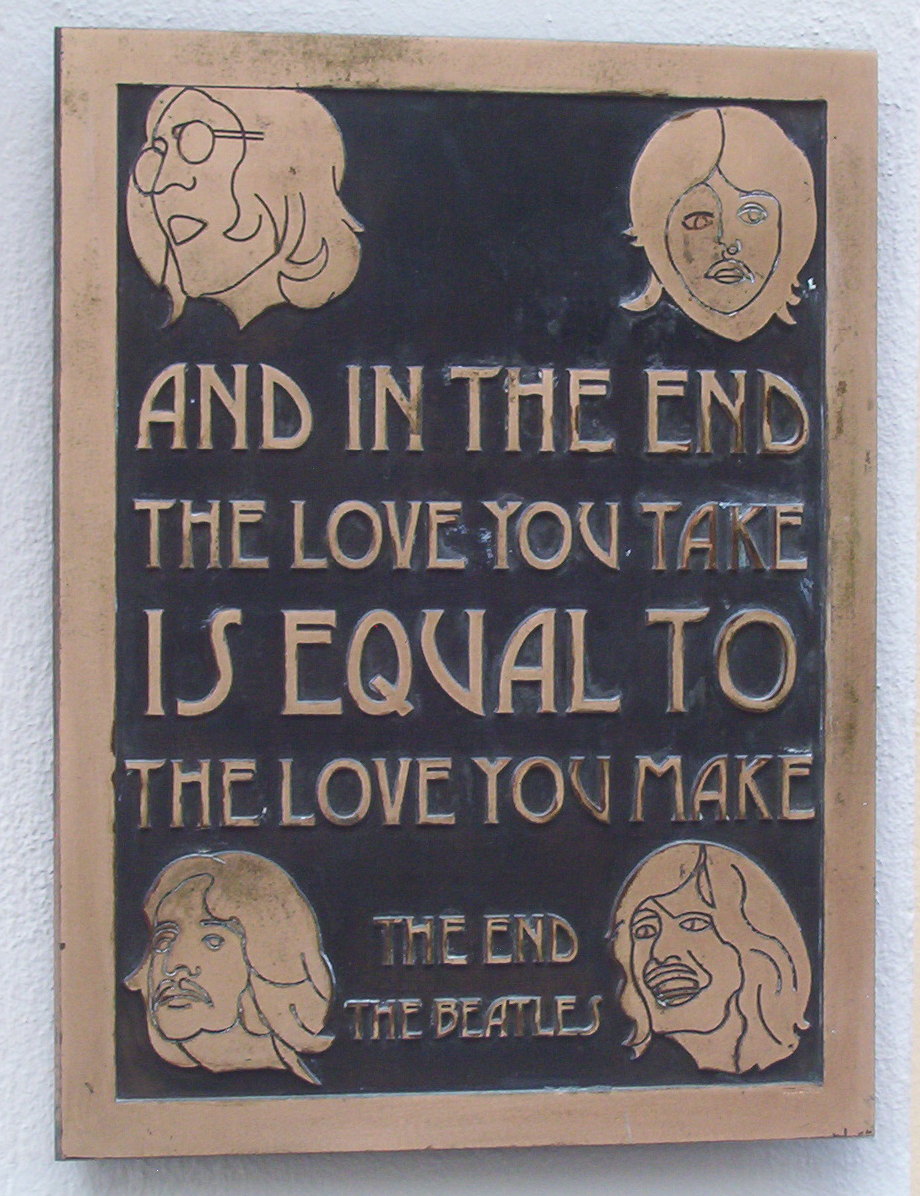
The medley of songs on side two finished with "The End".

The remainder of side two (with the exception of "Her Majesty") is a 16-minute medley of short songs and song fragments presented as eight tracks. Known during the recording sessions as "The Long One", it was recorded over July and August and blended into a suite by McCartney and Martin. Some songs were written (and originally recorded in demo form) during sessions for The Beatles and Get Back / Let It Be, which later appeared on Anthology 3. While the idea for the medley was McCartney's, Martin claims credit for some structure, adding he "wanted to get John and Paul to think more seriously about their music".

The first track recorded for the medley was the opening number, "You Never Give Me Your Money". McCartney has said the band's dispute over Allen Klein and what McCartney viewed as Klein's empty promises were the inspiration for the song's lyrics. However, MacDonald doubts this, given that the backing track, recorded on 6 May at Olympic Studios, predated the worst altercations between Klein and McCartney. The track is a suite of varying styles, ranging from a piano-led ballad at the start to arpeggiated guitars at the end. Both Harrison and Lennon provided guitar solos, with Lennon playing the solos at the end of the track.

This song transitions into Lennon's "Sun King" which, like "Because", showcases Lennon, McCartney and Harrison's triple-tracked harmonies. Following it are Lennon's "Mean Mr. Mustard" (written during the Beatles' 1968 trip to India) and "Polythene Pam". These in turn are followed by four McCartney songs, "She Came In Through the Bathroom Window" (written after a fan entered McCartney's residence via his bathroom window), "Golden Slumbers" (based on Thomas Dekker's 17th-century poem set to new music), "Carry That Weight" (reprising elements from "You Never Give Me Your Money", and featuring chorus vocals from all four Beatles), and closing with "The End".

"The End" features Starr's only drum solo in the Beatles' catalogue (the drums are mixed across two tracks in "true stereo", unlike most releases at that time where they were hard-panned left or right). Fifty-four seconds into the song are 18 bars of lead guitar: the first two bars are played by McCartney, the second two by Harrison, and the third two by Lennon, and the sequence is repeated two more times. Harrison suggested the idea of a guitar solo in the track, Lennon decided they should trade solos and McCartney elected to go first. The solos were cut live against the existing backing track in one take. Immediately after Lennon's third and final solo, the piano chords of the final part of the song begin. The song ends with the memorable final line, "And in the end, the love you take is equal to the love you make". This section was taped separately from the first and required the piano to be re-recorded by McCartney, which was done on 18 August.

Musicologist Walter Everett interprets that most of the lyrics on side two's medley deal with "selfishness and self-gratification – the financial complaints in 'You Never Give Me Your Money,' the miserliness of Mr. Mustard, the holding back of the pillow in 'Carry That Weight,' the desire that some second person will visit the singer's dreams – perhaps the 'one sweet dream' of 'You Never Give Me Your Money'? – in 'The End.'" Everett adds that the medley's "selfish moments" are played in the context of the tonal centre of A, while "generosity" is expressed in songs where C major is central. The medley concludes with a "great compromise in the 'negotiations'" in "The End", which serves as a structurally balanced coda. In response to the repeated A-major choruses of "love you", McCartney sings in realisation that there is as much self-gratifying love ("the love you take") as there is of the generous love ("the love you make"), in A major and C major, respectively.

==== "Her Majesty" ====
"Her Majesty" was recorded by McCartney on 2 July when he arrived before the rest of the group at Abbey Road. It was originally included in a rough mix of the side two medley, appearing between "Mean Mr. Mustard" and "Polythene Pam". McCartney disliked the way the medley sounded when it included "Her Majesty", so he asked for it to be cut. The second engineer, John Kurlander, had been instructed not to throw out anything, so after McCartney left, he attached the track to the end of the master tape after 20 seconds of silence. The Beatles liked this effect and included it on the album; Kurlander recalls, "I'm only assuming this, but ... [Paul] must have liked hearing 'Her Majesty' tacked on the end. The Beatles always picked up on accidental things. It came as a nice surprise there at the end."

"Her Majesty" opens with the final, crashing chord of "Mean Mr. Mustard", while the final note remained buried in the mix of "Polythene Pam", as a result of being snipped off the reel during a rough mix of the medley on 30 July. The medley was subsequently mixed again from scratch although the song was not touched again and still appears in its rough mix on the album. However, the original album sleeve does not list it.

=== Unreleased material ===
Three days after the session for "I Want You (She's So Heavy)", Harrison recorded solo demos of "All Things Must Pass" (which became the title track of his 1970 triple album), "Something" and "Old Brown Shoe". The latter was re-recorded by the Beatles in April 1969 and issued as the B-side of "The Ballad of John and Yoko" the following month. All three of these Harrison demos were later featured on Anthology 3.

During the sessions for the medley, McCartney recorded "Come and Get It", playing all the instruments. It was assumed to be a demo recording for another artist but McCartney later said that he originally intended to put it on Abbey Road. It was instead covered by Badfinger, while McCartney's original recording appeared on Anthology 3.

The original backing track to "Something", featuring a piano-led coda, and "You Never Give Me Your Money", which leads into a fast rock-n-roll jam session, have appeared on bootlegs.

== Cover photo ==
Only six session photos were taken by Macmillan; three in which the band walked across the zebra crossing to the right, and three to the left

Apple Records creative director John Kosh designed the album cover. It is the only original UK Beatles album sleeve to show neither the artist name nor the album title on its front cover. EMI believed that the record would not sell without this information, but Kosh said that "we didn't need to write the band's name on the cover [...] They were the most famous band in the world". The front cover was a photograph of the group walking on a zebra crossing, based on ideas that McCartney sketched, (Note: A working title of the album was Everest, after a brand of cigarettes favoured by Emerick, but the band were reluctant to travel to the Himalayas for a photo session.) and taken on 8 August 1969 outside EMI Studios on Abbey Road. At 11:35 that morning, photographer Iain Macmillan was given ten minutes to take the photo while he stood on a step-ladder and a policeman held up traffic behind the camera. McCartney later examined with a magnifying glass each of the six photographs Macmillan had taken before deciding which would be used on the album sleeve.

In the image selected by McCartney, the group walk across the street in single file from left to right, with Lennon leading, followed by Starr, McCartney and Harrison. McCartney is barefoot and out of step with the others. Except for Harrison, who is dressed in denim, the group are wearing suits designed by Tommy Nutter. A white Volkswagen Beetle is to the left of the picture, parked next to the zebra crossing, which belonged to one of the people living in the block of flats across from the recording studio. After the album was released, the number plate (LMW 281F) was repeatedly stolen from the car. (Note: In 1986, the car was sold at auction for £2,530 and in 2001 was on display in a museum in Germany.) In 2004, news sources published a claim made by Paul Cole, a retired American salesman, that he was the man standing on the pavement next to the police van, to the right of the picture.

== Release ==
In mid-1969, Lennon formed a new group, the Plastic Ono Band, in part because the Beatles had rejected his song "Cold Turkey". While Harrison worked with such artists as Leon Russell, Doris Troy, Preston and Delaney & Bonnie through to the end of the year, McCartney took a hiatus from the group after his daughter Mary was born on 28 August. On 20 September, six days before Abbey Road was released, Lennon told McCartney, Starr, and business manager Allen Klein (Harrison was not present) that he "wanted a divorce" from the group. Apple released "Something" backed with "Come Together" in the US on 6 October 1969. Release of the single in the UK followed on 31 October, while Lennon released the Plastic Ono Band's "Cold Turkey" the same month.

The Beatles did little promotion of Abbey Road directly, and no public announcement was made of the band's split until McCartney announced he was leaving the group in April 1970. By this time, the Get Back project (by now retitled Let It Be) had been re-examined, with overdubs and mixing sessions continuing into 1970. Therefore, Let It Be became the last album to be finished and released by the Beatles, although its recording had begun before Abbey Road.

Abbey Road sold four million copies in its first two months of release. In the UK, the album debuted at number 1 where it remained for eleven weeks before being displaced for one week by the Rolling Stones' Let It Bleed. The following week (which was Christmas), Abbey Road returned to the top for another six weeks (completing a total of seventeen weeks) before being displaced by Led Zeppelin's Led Zeppelin II. Altogether, it spent 81 weeks on the UK albums chart. The album also performed strongly overseas. In the US, it spent eleven weeks at number 1 on the Billboard Top LPs chart. It was the National Association of Recording Merchandisers (NARM) best-selling album of 1969. In Japan, it was one of the longest-charting albums to date, remaining in the top 100 for 298 weeks during the 1970s.

== Critical reception ==
=== Contemporary ===
Abbey Road initially received mixed reviews from music critics, some of whom criticised the production's artificial sounds and viewed its music as inauthentic. William Mann of The Times said that the album will "be called gimmicky by people who want a record to sound exactly like a live performance", although he considered it to be "teem[ing] with musical invention" and added: "Nice as 'Come Together' and Harrison's 'Something' are – they are minor pleasures in the context of the whole disc [...] Side Two is marvellous". Ed Ward of Rolling Stone called the album "complicated instead of complex" and felt that the Moog synthesiser "disembodies and artificializes" the band's sound, adding that they "create a sound that could not possibly exist outside the studio".

While he found the medley on side two to be their "most impressive music" since Rubber Soul, Nik Cohn of The New York Times said that, "individually", the album's songs are "nothing special". Albert Goldman of Life magazine wrote that Abbey Road "is not one of the Beatles' great albums" and, despite some "lovely" phrases and "stirring" segues, side two's suite "seems symbolic of the Beatles' latest phase, which might be described as the round-the-clock production of disposable music effects". John Gabree of the magazine High Fidelity wrote, of the album, "what's to say? If you like the Beatles, you'll like the record. If you have your doubts, this will do nothing to allay them. Of course, as someone just said, they do have 'something.'"

In contrast, Chris Welch wrote in Melody Maker: "the truth is, their latest LP is just a natural born gas, entirely free of pretension, deep meanings or symbolism [...] While production is simple compared to past intricacies, it is still extremely sophisticated and inventive." Derek Jewell of The Sunday Times found the album "refreshingly terse and unpretentious", and although he lamented the band's "cod-1920s jokes (Maxwell's Silver Hammer) and [...] Ringo's obligatory nursery arias (Octopus's Garden)", he considered that Abbey Road "touches higher peaks than did their last album".

John Mendelsohn, writing for Rolling Stone, called it "breathtakingly recorded" and praised side two especially, equating it to "the whole of Sgt. Pepper" and stating, "That the Beatles can unify seemingly countless musical fragments and lyrical doodlings into a uniformly wonderful suite [...] seems potent testimony that no, they've far from lost it, and no, they haven't stopped trying." Don Heckman of Stereo Review named the album one of the "Best Recordings of the Month" of January 1970, remarking that it was "better than The Beatles or Magical Mystery Tour, and probably the equal of Sgt. Pepper", adding, "I suppose I haven't really come up with any new compliments for the Beatles – not that they need them. But I hope I have at least persuaded you to hear 'Abbey Road.' You'll find it a happy experience."

While covering the Rolling Stones' 1969 American tour for The Village Voice, Robert Christgau reported from a meeting with Greil Marcus in Berkeley that "opinion has shifted against the Beatles. Everyone is putting down Abbey Road." Shortly afterwards, in Los Angeles, he wrote that his colleague Ellen Willis had grown to love the record, adding: "Damned if she isn't right – flawed but fine. Because the world is round it turns her on. Charlie Watts tells us he likes it too."

=== Retrospective ===
Professional ratings
Review scores
Source	Rating
AllMusic	5/5 stars
The A.V. Club	A
Consequence of Sound	A+
The Daily Telegraph	5/5 stars
Encyclopedia of Popular Music	5/5 stars
MusicHound Rock	5/5 stars
Paste	100/100
Pitchfork	10/10
The Rolling Stone Album Guide	5/5 stars

Many critics have since cited Abbey Road as the Beatles' greatest album. In a retrospective review, Nicole Pensiero of PopMatters called it "an amazingly cohesive piece of music, innovative and timeless". Mark Kemp of Paste viewed the album as being "among the Beatles' finest works, even if it foreshadows the cigarette-lighter-waving arena rock that technically skilled but critically maligned artists from Journey to Meatloaf would belabor throughout the '70s and '80s". Neil McCormick of The Daily Telegraph dubbed it the Beatles' "last love letter to the world" and praised its "big, modern sound", calling it "lush, rich, smooth, epic, emotional and utterly gorgeous".

AllMusic's Richie Unterberger felt that the album shared Sgt. Pepper's "faux-conceptual forms", but had "stronger compositions", and wrote of its standing in the band's catalogue: "Whether Abbey Road is the Beatles' best work is debatable, but it's certainly the most immaculately produced (with the possible exception of Sgt. Pepper) and most tightly constructed." Ian MacDonald gave a mixed opinion of the album, noting that several tracks had been written at least a year previously, and would possibly have been unsuitable without being integrated into the medley on side two. He did, however, praise the production, particularly the sound of Starr's bass drum.

Abbey Road has received high rankings in several "greatest albums of all time" lists and polls by critics and publications. It was voted number 8 in the third edition of Colin Larkin's book All Time Top 1000 Albums (2000). Time included it in their 2006 list of the All-Time 100 Albums. In 2009, readers of Rolling Stone named Abbey Road the greatest Beatles album. In 2020, the magazine ranked the album at number 5 on its list of the "500 Greatest Albums of All Time", the highest Beatles record on the list; a previous version of the list from 2012 had ranked it at number 14. The album was also included in the book 1001 Albums You Must Hear Before You Die.

== Legacy ==
=== Abbey Road crossing and "Paul is dead" ===
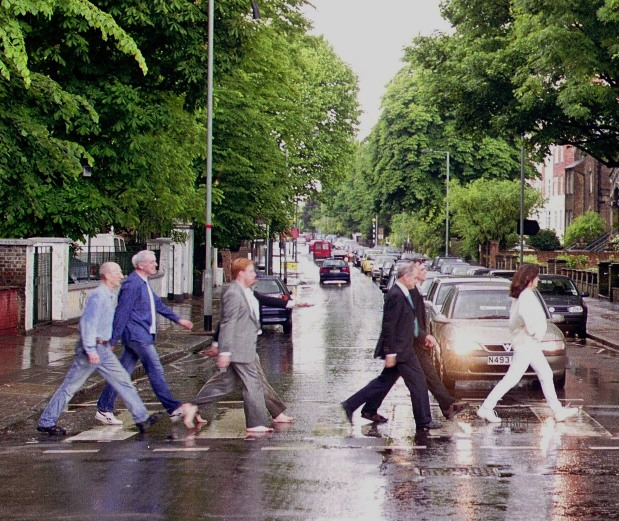
Imitating the cover of Abbey Road has become popular with fans (pictured is the Cassini–Huygens team, with Carolyn Porco in white).

The front cover image of the Beatles on the Abbey Road crossing has become one of the most famous and imitated in recording history. The crossing is a popular destination for Beatles fans, and a webcam has operated there since 2011. In December 2010, the crossing was given grade II listed status for its "cultural and historical importance"; the Abbey Road studios themselves had been given similar status earlier in the year. In 2019, Thames Water installed a commemorative manhole cover to mark the album's 50th anniversary.

Shortly after the album's release, the cover became part of the "Paul is dead" rumour that was spreading across college campuses in the U.S. According to followers of the conspiracy theory, the album cover depicted the Beatles walking out of a cemetery in a funeral procession. The procession was led by Lennon dressed in white as a religious figure; Starr was dressed in black as the undertaker; McCartney, out of step with the others, was supposedly a barefoot corpse; and Harrison dressed in denim was the gravedigger. The left-handed McCartney is holding a cigarette in his right hand, indicating that he is an impostor, and part of the number plate on the Volkswagen parked on the street is 281F (misread as 28IF), meaning that McCartney would have been 28 if he had lived – despite the fact that he was only 27 at the time of the photo and subsequent release of the record. The escalation of the "Paul is dead" rumour became the subject of intense analysis on mainstream radio and contributed to Abbey Road's commercial success in the U.S. Lennon was interviewed in London by New York's WMCA and ridiculed the rumour, but conceded that it was invaluable publicity for the album.

The cover image has been parodied on several occasions, including by Booker T. & the M.G.'s McLemore Avenue (1970), Kanye West's Late Orchestration (2006) and by McCartney on his 1993 live album Paul Is Live. On the cover of its October 1977 issue, the satirical magazine National Lampoon depicted the four Beatles flattened along the zebra crossing, with a road roller driving away up the street. The Red Hot Chili Peppers' The Abbey Road E.P. parodies the cover, with the band walking near-naked across a similar zebra crossing. In 2003, several US poster companies airbrushed McCartney's cigarette out of the image without permission from Apple or McCartney. In 2013, Kolkata Police launched a traffic safety awareness advertisement against jaywalking, using the cover and a caption that read: "If they can, why can't you?" A 2015 promotional shot for Doctor Who showed Clara Oswald (Jenna Coleman) and the Twelfth Doctor (Peter Capaldi) walking across the Abbey Road crossing with two Daleks. The Fifteenth Doctor (Ncuti Gatwa) and Ruby Sunday (Millie Gibson) also recreate the pose in the 2024 episode "The Devil's Chord". A promotional poster for the 2019 film Yesterday, which is about a musician who suddenly finds himself as the only person who remembers the Beatles and becomes famous for performing their songs, depicts Himesh Patel, the film's lead actor, walking on a similar zebra crossing alone.

To mark the 50th anniversary of the album's release, an estimated 3,500 fans gathered at the crossing site to recreate the famous photo. That same year, London Zoo also ran an advertising campaign with a row of beetles using the crossing.

=== Cover versions and influence ===
The songs on Abbey Road have been covered many times and the album itself has been covered in its entirety. One month after Abbey Road's release, George Benson recorded a cover version of the album called The Other Side of Abbey Road. Later in 1969 Booker T. & the M.G.'s recorded McLemore Avenue (the location in Memphis of Stax Records) which covered the Abbey Road songs and had a similar cover photo.

While matching albums such as Sgt. Pepper in terms of popularity, Abbey Road failed to repeat the Beatles' earlier achievements in galvanising their rivals to imitate them. In author Peter Doggett's description, "Too contrived for the rock underground to copy, too complex for the bubblegum pop brigade to copy, the album influenced no one – except [Paul McCartney]", who spent years trying to emulate its scope in his solo career. Writing for Classic Rock in 2014, Jon Anderson of the progressive rock band Yes said his group were constantly influenced by the Beatles from Revolver onwards, but it was the feeling that side two was "one complete idea" that inspired him to create long-form pieces of music. (Note: Anderson added: "[The Beatles] showed us that you can do anything ... That if you can do it with love, heart and honesty, it'll work.")

Several artists have covered some or all of the side-two medley, including Phil Collins (for the Martin/Beatles tribute album In My Life), The String Cheese Incident, Transatlantic and Tenacious D (who performed the medley with Phish keyboardist Page McConnell). Furthur, a jam band including former Grateful Dead members Bob Weir and Phil Lesh, played the entire Abbey Road album during its Spring Tour 2011. It began with a "Come Together" opener at Boston on 4 March and ended with the entire medley in New York City on 15 March, including "Her Majesty" as an encore.

=== Continued sales and reissues ===
In June 1970, Allen Klein reported that Abbey Road was the Beatles' best-selling album in the US with sales of about five million. By 1992, Abbey Road had sold nine million copies. The album became the ninth-most downloaded on the iTunes Store a week after it was released there on 16 November 2010. A CNN report stated it was the best-selling vinyl album of 2011. It is the first album from the 1960s to sell more than five million albums since 1991 when Nielsen SoundScan began tracking sales. In the US, the album had sold 7,177,797 copies by the end of the 1970s. As of 2011, the album had sold more than 31 million copies worldwide and is one of the band's best-selling albums. In October 2019, Abbey Road re-entered the UK charts, again hitting number one.

Abbey Road has remained in print since its first release in 1969. The original album was released on 26 September in the UK and 1 October in the US on Apple Records. It was reissued as a limited-edition picture disc on vinyl in the US by Capitol on 27 December 1978, while a CD reissue of the album was released in 1987, with a remastered version appearing in 2009. The remaster included additional photographs with additional liner notes and the first, limited edition, run also included a short documentary about the making of the album.

In 2001, Abbey Road was certified 12× platinum by the Recording Industry Association of America (RIAA). The album continues to be reissued on vinyl. It was included as part of the Beatles' Collector's Crate series in September 2009 and saw a remastered LP release on 180-gram vinyl in 2012.

A super deluxe version of the album, which featured new mixes by Giles Martin, was released in September 2019 to celebrate the album's 50th anniversary. It included 23 unreleased demos and takes for Abbey Road.

As of October 2019, Abbey Road has sold 2,240,608 pure sales in the United Kingdom with all consumed sales standing at 2,327,230 units. Post-1994 sales stand at 827,329.

== Track listing ==
All tracks are written by Lennon–McCartney, except where noted.

Side one
No.	Title	Writer(s)	Lead vocals	Length
1.	"Come Together"		Lennon	4:19
2.	"Something"	George Harrison	Harrison	3:02
3.	"Maxwell's Silver Hammer"		McCartney	3:27
4.	"Oh! Darling"		McCartney	3:27
5.	"Octopus's Garden"	Richard Starkey	Starr	2:51
6.	"I Want You (She's So Heavy)"		Lennon	7:47
Total length:				24:53

Side two
No.	Title	Writer(s)	Lead vocals	Length
1.	"Here Comes the Sun"	Harrison	Harrison	3:05
2.	"Because"		Lennon, McCartney and Harrison	2:45
3.	"You Never Give Me Your Money"		McCartney	4:03
4.	"Sun King"		Lennon with McCartney and Harrison	2:26
5.	"Mean Mr. Mustard"		Lennon	1:06
6.	"Polythene Pam"		Lennon	1:13
7.	"She Came In Through the Bathroom Window"		McCartney	1:58
8.	"Golden Slumbers"		McCartney	1:31
9.	"Carry That Weight"		McCartney with Lennon, Harrison and Starr	1:36
10.	"The End"		McCartney	2:05
11.	"Her Majesty" (hidden track)		McCartney	0:23
Total length:				22:10

Notes

- "Her Majesty" appears as a hidden track after "The End" and 14 seconds of silence. Later releases of the album included the song on the track listing, except some vinyl editions.
- Some cassette tape versions in the UK and US had "Come Together" and "Here Comes the Sun" swapped to even out the playing time of each side.

== Personnel ==
Sources: (Note: Mark Lewisohn; Ian MacDonald; Barry Miles; Kevin Howlett; and Geoff Emerick)

The Beatles

- John Lennon – lead, harmony and backing vocals; rhythm, lead and acoustic guitars; acoustic and electric pianos, Moog synthesiser; white noise generator and sound effects; percussion
- Paul McCartney – lead, harmony and backing vocals; bass, rhythm, lead and acoustic guitars; acoustic and electric pianos, Moog synthesiser; sound effects; wind chimes, handclaps and percussion
- George Harrison – harmony and backing vocals; lead, rhythm, acoustic and bass guitars; Moog synthesiser; harmonium; handclaps and percussion; lead vocals (on "Something", "Here Comes the Sun", and "Because")
- Ringo Starr – drums and percussion; backing vocals; anvil on "Maxwell's Silver Hammer"; lead vocals (on "Octopus's Garden")

Additional musicians

- George Martin – organ, harpsichord, percussion
- Billy Preston – Hammond organ (on "Something" and "I Want You (She's So Heavy)")

Production

- "Something" and "Here Comes the Sun" orchestrated and conducted by George Martin (with George Harrison)
- "Golden Slumbers", "Carry That Weight" and "The End" orchestrated and conducted by George Martin (with Paul McCartney)
- Produced by George Martin (with the Beatles)
- Recorded by Geoff Emerick and Phil McDonald
- Assistant engineering by Alan Parsons
- Mixed by Geoff Emerick, Phil McDonald and George Martin (with the Beatles)
- Moog programming by Mike Vickers

== Charts ==
Original release

Chart (1969–71)	Position
Australian Kent Music Report	1
Canadian RPM LP Chart	1
Dutch MegaChart Albums	1
Finland (Suomen virallinen lista)	1
Italian Musica e dischi Chart	1
Japanese Oricon LPs Chart	3
Norwegian VG-lista Albums Chart	1
Swedish Kvällstoppen Chart	1
Spanish Albums Chart	1
UK Albums Chart	1
US Billboard Top LPs	1
West German Media Control Albums Chart	1

1987 reissue

Chart	Position
Japanese Albums Chart	6
UK Albums Chart	30

2009 reissue

Chart	Position
Australian Albums Chart	12
Austrian Albums Chart	36
Belgian Albums Chart (Flanders)	20
Belgian Albums Chart (Wallonia)	28
Danish Albums Chart	18
Finnish Albums Chart	12
German Albums Chart	41
Italian Albums Chart	7
Japanese Albums Chart	12
Mexican Albums Chart	8
Portuguese Albums Chart	4
Spanish Albums Chart	13
Swedish Albums Chart	6
Swiss Albums Chart	28
New Zealand Albums Chart	8
UK Albums Chart	6
US Billboard Comprehensive Albums	3

2019 reissue

Chart	Position
Australian Albums (ARIA)	2
Belgian Albums (Ultratop Flanders)	1
Belgian Albums (Ultratop Wallonia)	4
Canadian Albums (Billboard)	3
Croatian International Albums (HDU)	36
Czech Albums (ČNS IFPI)	23
Danish Albums (Hitlisten)	3
Dutch Albums (Album Top 100)	1
Finnish Albums (Suomen virallinen lista)	13
German Albums (Offizielle Top 100)	2
Greece Albums (Billboard)	1
Hungarian Albums (MAHASZ)	34
Irish Albums (IRMA)	3
Italian Albums (FIMI)	3
Mexican Albums (AMPROFON)	5
New Zealand Albums (RMNZ)	6
Norwegian Albums (VG-lista)	2
Polish Albums (ZPAV)	16
Portuguese Albums (AFP)	1
Scottish Albums (Official Charts)	1
Spanish Albums (PROMUSICAE)	1
Swedish Albums (Sverigetopplistan)	4
Swiss Albums (Schweizer Hitparade)	3
UK Albums (Official Charts)	1
US Billboard 200	3
US Top Rock Albums (Billboard)	1

Year-end charts
Chart (1969)	Position
Australian Albums Chart	3
UK Albums Chart	1
Chart (1970)	Position
Australian Albums Chart	7
UK Albums Chart	7
US Billboard Pop Albums	4
Chart (2017)	Position
US Billboard 200	138
US Top Rock Albums (Billboard)	27
Chart (2018)	Position
US Billboard 200	163
US Top Rock Albums (Billboard)	26
Chart (2019)	Position
Australian Albums (ARIA)	40
Austrian Albums (Ö3 Austria)	72
Belgian Albums (Ultratop Flanders)	41
Belgian Albums (Ultratop Wallonia)	90
Danish Albums (Hitlisten)	68
Dutch Albums (Album Top 100)	47
Mexican Albums (AMPROFON)	85
Spanish Albums (PROMUSICAE)	73
Swedish Albums (Sverigetopplistan)	94
UK Albums (OCC)	38
US Billboard 200	57
US Top Rock Albums (Billboard)	7
Worldwide Albums (IFPI)	10
Chart (2020)	Position
Australian Albums (ARIA)	95
Belgian Albums (Ultratop Flanders)	145
Dutch Albums (Album Top 100)	90
Spanish Albums (PROMUSICAE)	91
US Billboard 200	66
US Top Rock Albums (Billboard)	5
Chart (2021)	Position
Belgian Albums (Ultratop Flanders)	128
Dutch Albums (Album Top 100)	68
US Billboard 200	96
US Top Rock Albums (Billboard)	11
Chart (2022)	Position
Belgian Albums (Ultratop Flanders)	192
US Billboard 200	103
US Top Rock Albums (Billboard)	16

Decade-end charts
Chart (1960s)	Position
UK Albums Chart	4
Chart (1970s)	Position
Japanese Albums Chart	22

== Certifications and sales ==
Certifications and sales
Region	Certification	Certified units/sales
Argentina (CAPIF)	Diamond	506,916
Australia (ARIA)	3× Platinum	210,000^{^}
Belgium (BRMA)	Platinum	50,000^{‡}
Brazil	—	390,000
Canada (Music Canada)	Diamond	1,000,000^{^}
Denmark (IFPI Danmark)	4× Platinum	80,000^{‡}
France (SNEP)	Gold	100,000^{*}
Germany (BVMI)	Platinum	500,000^{^}
Italy (FIMI) sales since 2009	2× Platinum	100,000^{‡}
Japan	—	655,000
New Zealand (RMNZ)	5× Platinum	75,000^{^}
United Kingdom (BPI)	8× Platinum	2,400,000^{‡}
United States (RIAA)	12× Platinum	12,000,000^{^}
Summaries
Worldwide Worldwide sales in 2019	—	800,000
Worldwide Worldwide sales up to 2014	—	31,000,000
^{*} Sales figures based on certification alone.^{^} Shipments figures based on certification alone.^{‡} Sales+streaming figures based on certification alone.

^{†} BPI certification awarded only for sales since 1994.

== Release history ==
Country	Date	Label	Format	Catalogue number
United Kingdom	26 September 1969	Apple (Parlophone)	LP	PCS 7088
United States	1 October 1969	Apple, Capitol	LP	SO 383
Japan	21 May 1983	Toshiba-EMI	Compact Disc	CP35-3016
Worldwide reissue	10 October 1987	Apple, Parlophone, EMI	CD	CDP 7 46446 2
Japan	11 March 1998	Toshiba-EMI	CD	TOCP 51122
Japan	21 January 2004	Toshiba-EMI	Remastered LP	TOJP 60142
Worldwide reissue	9 September 2009	Apple, Parlophone, EMI	Remastered CD	0946 3 82468 24
Worldwide reissue	27 September 2019	Apple, Universal Music Group International	Remixed LP	7791512
Worldwide reissue	27 September 2019	Apple, Universal Music Group International	LP+ (picture disc)	804888
Worldwide reissue	27 September 2019	Apple, Universal Music Group International	3×LP	800744
Worldwide reissue	27 September 2019	Apple, Universal Music Group International	CD	800743
Worldwide reissue	27 September 2019	Apple, Universal Music Group International	2×CD	7791507
Worldwide reissue	27 September 2019	Apple, Universal Music Group International	3×CD+Blu-ray box set	7792112

== See also ==
- Outline of the Beatles
- The Beatles timeline
- The Beatles albums discography
