= List of top 25 albums for 1969 in Australia =

Top 25 albums of 1969 < 1968 1970 >

Other Australian top charts for 1969
- top 25 singles

Australian number-one charts of 1969
- albums
- singles

The following lists the top 25 (end of year) charting albums on the Australian Album Charts, for the year of 1969. These were the best charting albums in Australia for 1969. The source for this year is the "Kent Music Report", known from 1987 onwards as the "Australian Music Report".

| # | Title | Artist | Highest pos. reached | Weeks at No. 1 |
|---|---|---|---|---|
| 1. | Hair | Original Broadway Cast | 1 | 28 |
| 2. | The Beatles | The Beatles | 1 | 16 (pkd #1 in 1968 & 69) |
| 3. | Abbey Road | The Beatles | 1 | 18 (pkd #1 in 1969 & 70) |
| 4. | Oliver | Soundtrack | 2 | |
| 5. | The Graduate | Soundtrack / Simon and Garfunkel | 1 | 1 (pkd #1 in 1968) |
| 6. | Nashville Skyline | Bob Dylan | 2 | |
| 7. | Switched on Bach | Wendy Carlos | 2 | |
| 8. | The Sound of Music | Original Soundtrack Recording | 1 | 76 (pkd #1 in 1965, 66 & 67) |
| 9. | Blood Sweat & Tears | Blood, Sweat & Tears | 4 | |
| 10. | Johnny Cash at San Quentin | Johnny Cash | 2 | |
| 11. | Funny Girl | Soundtrack Barbra Streisand | 4 | |
| 12. | This Is Tom Jones | Tom Jones | 2 | |
| 13. | Fool on the Hill | Sergio Mendes and Brasil '66 | 6 | |
| 14. | Flaming Star | Elvis Presley | 3 | |
| 15. | Camelot | Soundtrack | 3 | |
| 16. | Donovan's Greatest Hits | Donovan | 2 | |
| 17. | TCB | Diana Ross & The Supremes and The Temptations | 3 | |
| 18. | Blind Faith | Blind Faith | 2 | |
| 19. | Sweet Charity | Soundtrack | 4 | |
| 20. | Hair | Australian Cast | 2 | |
| 21. | Wheels of Fire | Cream | 6 | 2 (pkd #1 in 1968) |
| 22. | The Best of Cilla Black | Cilla Black | 10 | |
| 23. | Hair | English Cast | 11 | |
| 24. | Electric Ladyland | Jimi Hendrix Experience | 3 | |
| 25. | Goodbye | Cream | 6 | |

These charts are calculated by David Kent of the Kent Music Report and they are based on the number of weeks and position the records reach within the top 100 albums for each week.

source: David Kent's "Australian Chart Book 1940-1969"
