= List of top 25 albums for 1972 in Australia =

Top 25 albums of 1972 < 1971 1973 >

Other Australian top charts for 1972
- top 25 singles

Australian top 40 charts for the 1980s
- singles
- albums

Australian number-one charts of 1972
- albums
- singles

The following lists the top 25 (end of year) charting albums on the Australian Album Charts, for the year of 1972. These were the best charting albums in Australia for 1972. The source for this year is the "Kent Music Report", known from 1987 onwards as the "Australian Music Report".

#	Title	Artist	Highest pos. reached	Weeks at No. 1
1.	Teaser and the Firecat	Cat Stevens	1	15
2.	Thick as a Brick	Jethro Tull	1	11
3.	American Pie	Don McLean	1	11
4.	Slade Alive!	Slade	1	12 (pkd #1 in 1972 & 73)
5.	Harvest	Neil Young	1	1
6.	Machine Head	Deep Purple	1	2
7.	Led Zeppelin IV	Led Zeppelin	2	
8.	Tea for the Tillerman	Cat Stevens	2	
9.	Nilsson Schmilsson	Nilsson	2	
10.	Jesus Christ Superstar	Original Studio Recording	6	
11.	Moods	Neil Diamond	4	
12.	Catch Bull at Four	Cat Stevens	1	7
13.	Imagine	John Lennon	1	2
14.	School's Out	Alice Cooper	5	
15.	Honky Chateau	Elton John	4	
16.	Great Hits of the Carpenters	The Carpenters	3	
17.	A Nod Is as Good as a Wink...To a Blind Horse	The Faces	4	
18.	Never a Dull Moment	Rod Stewart	3	
19.	Exile on Main Street	The Rolling Stones	2	
20.	America	America	3	
21.	Aztecs Live at Sunbury	The Aztecs	4	
22.	Paul Simon	Paul Simon	5	
23.	Every Picture Tells a Story	Rod Stewart	1	(pkd #1 in 1971)
24.	Wild Life	Wings	3	
25.	Fireball	Deep Purple	5	

These charts are calculated by David Kent of the Kent Music Report and they are based on the number of weeks and position the records reach within the top 100 albums for each week.

source: David Kent's "Australian Chart Book 1970-1992"
