= Risiville =

- Location within Gauteng Location within South Africa
- Coordinates: 26°38′S 27°58′E
- Country: South Africa
- Province: Gauteng
- District: Sedibeng
- Municipality: Midvaal
- Main Place: Meyerton

Area
  - Total: 4.49 km^{2} (1.73 sq mi)

Population (2011)
  - Total: 4,005
  - Density: 892/km^{2} (2,310/sq mi)

Racial makeup (2011)
  - Black African: 13.3%
  - Coloured: 0.8%
  - Indian/Asian: 0.5%
  - White: 84.2%
  - Other: 1.2%

First languages (2011)
  - Afrikaans: 74.3%
  - English: 15.4%
  - Sotho: 4.6%
  - Zulu: 1.4%
  - Other: 4.4%
- Time zone: UTC+2 (SAST)
- Postal code (street): 1929

Risiville is located on the northern side of Vereeniging, Gauteng, South Africa. Risiville falls under the Midvaal Local Municipality. As far as property prices are concerned, the second highest prices for houses in the Midvaal Area were recorded in Risiville (2007).

Risiville is bordered on the western, northern and eastern sides by agricultural land and small holdings. On the eastern and northern side it is bordered by Risi Small Farms and on the western side by McKay Estates agricultural small holdings.

The suburb is home to Risiville Laerskool (Risiville Primary School), which is one of the leading primary schools in the region.
