= List of top 25 singles for 1972 in Australia =

Top 25 singles of 1972 < 1971 1973 >

Other Australian top charts for 1972
- top 25 albums

Australian top 40 charts for the 1980s
- singles
- albums

Australian number-one charts of 1972
- albums
- singles

The following lists the top 25 (end of year) charting singles on the Australian Singles Charts, for the year of 1972. These were the best charting singles in Australia for 1972. The source for this year is the "Kent Music Report", known from 1987 onwards as the "Australian Music Report".

#	Title	Artist	Highest pos. reached	Weeks at No. 1
1.	"Puppy Love"	Donny Osmond	1	6
2.	"Without You"	Nilsson	1	5
3.	"Popcorn"	Hot Butter	1	8
4.	"American Pie"	Don McLean	1	5
5.	"Rangers Waltz"	The Mom and Dads	2	
6.	"Boppin' the Blues"	Blackfeather	1	2
7.	"Daddy Don't You Walk So Fast"	Wayne Newton	1	3
8.	"The First Time Ever I Saw Your Face"	Roberta Flack	1	2
9.	"Cherish"	David Cassidy	1	2
10.	"Amazing Grace"	The Pipes and Drums and the Military Band of the Royal Scots Dragoon Guards	1	5
11.	"Brand New Key"	Melanie	1	1
12.	"Most People I Know Think That I'm Crazy"	The Aztecs	2	
13.	"Alone Again (Naturally)"	Gilbert O'Sullivan	2	
14.	"Long Haired Lover from Liverpool"	Little Jimmy Osmond	2	
15.	"Sylvia's Mother"	Dr Hook	1	3
16.	"Long Cool Woman in a Black Dress"	The Hollies	2	
17.	"Ernie (The Fastest Milkman in the West)"	Benny Hill	1	2
18.	"Breaking Up is Hard to Do"	The Partridge Family	3	
19.	"Imagine"	John Lennon	1	5
20.	"Rock 'n' Roll (part 2)"	Gary Glitter	1	1
21.	"Day By Day"	Colleen Hewett	2	
22.	"A Horse with No Name"	America	2	
23.	"Hurting Each Other"	The Carpenters	4	
24.	"The Candy Man"	Sammy Davis Jr.	3	
25.	"Baby, Don't Get Hooked on Me"	Mac Davis	2	

These charts are calculated by David Kent of the Kent Music Report and they are based on the number of weeks and position the records reach within the top 100 singles for each week.

See also Kent Music Report index: Australian Chart Book website
