= List of top 25 singles for 1973 in Australia =

Top 25 singles of 1973 < 1972 1974 >

Other Australian top charts for 1973
- top 25 albums

Australian top 40 charts for the 1980s
- singles
- albums

Australian number-one charts of 1973
- albums
- singles

The following lists the top 25 (end of year) charting singles on the Australian Singles Charts, for the year of 1973. These were the best charting singles in Australia for 1973. The source for this year is the "Kent Music Report".

#	Title	Artist	Highest pos. reached	Weeks at No. 1
1.	"Tie a Yellow Ribbon Round the Ole Oak Tree"	Tony Orlando and Dawn	1	7
2.	"Never Never Never"	Shirley Bassey	1	2
3.	"You're So Vain"	Carly Simon	1	7
4.	"Heaven is My Woman's Love"	Col Joye	1	2
5.	"Crocodile Rock"	Elton John	2	
6.	"Delta Dawn"	Helen Reddy	1	5
7.	"Can the Can"	Suzi Quatro	1	6
8.	"I'd Love You to Want Me"	Lobo	1	2
9.	"And I Love You So"	Perry Como	2	
10.	"Daisy a Day"	Jud Strunk	1	2
11.	"Funny Face"	Donna Fargo	2	
12.	"Ben"	Michael Jackson	1	8
13.	"I Am Woman"	Helen Reddy	2	
14.	"Top of the World"	The Carpenters	1	4
15.	"I Don't Wanna Play House"	Barbara Ray	3	
16.	"The Morning After"	Maureen McGovern	1	2
17.	"Killing Me Softly With His Song"	Roberta Flack	1	2
18.	"He Did With Me"	Vicki Lawrence	1	1
19.	"Angie"	Rolling Stones	1	5
20.	"Last Song"	Edward Bear	2	
21.	"Monster Mash"	Bobby (Boris) Pickett	3	
22.	"Rubber Bullets"	10CC	3	
23.	"Dancin' (on a Saturday Night)"	Barry Blue	2	
24.	"My Love"	Paul McCartney & Wings	5	
25.	"Say, Has Anybody Seen My Sweet Gypsy Rose"	Tony Orlando and Dawn	2	

These charts are calculated by David Kent of the Kent Music Report and they are based on the number of weeks and position the records reach within the top 100 singles for each week.

source: David Kent's "Australian Chart Book 1970-1992"
