= List of top 25 albums for 1970 in Australia =

Top 25 albums of 1970 < 1969 1971 >

Other Australian top charts for 1970
- top 25 singles

Australian number-one charts of 1970
- albums
- singles

The following lists the top 25 (end of year) charting albums on the Australian Album Charts, for the year of 1970. These were the best charting albums in Australia for 1970. The source for this year is the "Kent Music Report", known from 1987 onwards as the "Australian Music Report".

#	Title	Artist	Highest pos. reached	Weeks at No. 1
1.	Bridge Over Troubled Water	Simon and Garfunkel	1	15
2.	Led Zeppelin II	Led Zeppelin	1	5
3.	Déjà Vu	Crosby, Stills, Nash & Young	1	2
4.	Willy and the Poor Boys	Creedence Clearwater Revival	2	
5.	Cosmo's Factory	Creedence Clearwater Revival	1	19 (pkd #1 in 1970 & 71)
6.	Let It Be	The Beatles	1	4
7.	Abbey Road	The Beatles	1	8
8.	Easy Rider	Motion Picture Soundtrack	4	
9.	Chicago	Chicago	5	(sometimes referred to as Chicago II)
10.	Feliciano 10-23	Jose Feliciano	2	
11.	Woodstock: Music from the Original Soundtrack and More	Various Artists	2	
12.	Tom Jones Live in Las Vegas	Tom Jones	2	
13.	Hair	Original Broadway Cast	1	(pkd #1 in 1969)
14.	Hair	Original Australian Cast	3	
15.	Self Portrait	Bob Dylan	3	
16.	Band of Gypsys	Jimi Hendrix, Buddy Miles, Billy Cox	3	
17.	McCartney	Paul McCartney	3	
18.	Morrison Hotel	The Doors	3	
19.	Best of the Bee Gees	Bee Gees	6	
20.	Hey Jude	The Beatles	1	2
21.	The Who Live at Leeds	The Who	6	
22.	Candles in the Rain	Melanie	2	
23.	In the Court of the Crimson King	King Crimson	7	
24.	Max Merritt and the Meteors	Max Merritt and the Meteors	7	
25.	Benefit	Jethro Tull	4	

These charts are calculated by David Kent of the Kent Music Report and they are based on the number of weeks and position the records reach within the top 100 albums for each week.

source: David Kent's "Australian Chart Book 1970-1992"
