= Terry Dempsey (songwriter) =

South African songwriter (1941–2019)

- Born: 8 March 1941; England
- Origin: South Africa
- Died: 10 February 2019 (aged 77) Vaal Marina, South Africa
- Occupation: Songwriter
- Formerly of: Lauren Copley; Dave Mills

Terry Dempsey (8 March 1941 – 10 February 2019) was a South African songwriter whose songs were made famous by a number of artists.

== Early life ==
Born in England, he moved to South Africa in 1978 and formed two record labels, Storm and MAP. He wrote the song "Daydreamer", which he took to Tokyo Music Festival in 1974 where it was picked up by Artie Wayne and recorded by David Cassidy. Cassidy's recording spent three weeks at the top of the UK singles chart in October and November 1973. A French adaptation, "Le Mal Aimé", recorded by Claude François, reached number 1 in France.

He also wrote "Love Is a Beautiful Song", performed by Dave Mills, which reached number 1 in South Africa, Canada and Australia. Two other songs written by him reached Number 1 in South Africa – "Spider Spider" by Tidal Wave and "Kentucky Blues" sung by Lauren Copley. His song "Home" recorded by Dave Mills won a SARIE award in 1971 for Song of the Year.

He also wrote theme songs for South African TV shows, including Twist Grip, TopSport, DriveTime, as well as the Comrades Marathon and television series' The Power of Persuasion and Wings Over Africa.

In 1988 he joined the board of the National Organisation of Rights In Music (later called the Southern African Music Rights Organisation) for a period of three years before being elected as chairman for a further two years.

In 1999 he produced and wrote the film score for the South African feature film Heel Against the Head.

== Writing credits ==
Some of his writing credits include:

Song	Performed by
Spider, Spider	Tidal Wave
She's a Gypsy	Cliff Richard
We grew up on Rock 'n Roll	The New Seekers
Smiley	Petula Clark
Time after time	Engelbert Humperdinck
Dancing heart to heart	Roddy
Vicky	Lance James
Flower of Life	Lauren Copley
Kentucky Blues	Lauren Copley
Butchers and Bakers	The Staccatos
Love Is A Beautiful Song	Dave Mills
You've got all of me	Clout

== Death ==
He was killed when he was struck by the blades of a gyrocopter when it made an emergency landing at the Vaal Marina during a family ash scattering.
