= Dave Mills (singer) =

English-Australian singer (1935–2014)

- Born: 20 August 1935; England
- Died: 14 May 2014 (aged 78) Perth, Australia
- Occupation: Musician
- Instrument: Vocals

Dave Mills (20 August 1935 – 14 May 2014) was an English-Australian singer. Mills was born in Bedlington, England and moved to Australia in 1961. He soon relocated to South Africa for six years where he started getting chart success. He move back to Australia in early 1972.

He had an international hit with "Love is a Beautiful Song". which went gold in Australia. Other charting singles in South Africa include "Theresa", "All The Tears In The World", "Home", "I Can't Go Home To Mary", "Tomorrow is Over" and "Mexico". All these songs were written by Terry Dempsey who won the SARI for best song for "Home".

In 1970 he won the SARI awards for best male singer and Country and Western singer. By 1973 he had moved to Australia. Mills died on 14 May 2014, at the age of 78.

== Discography ==
=== Albums ===
Title	Album details	Peak chart positions
Title	Album details	AUS
Theresa	Released: 1970; Format: LP; Label: Storm	—
Dave Mills	Released: 1970; Format: LP; Label: Storm	—
Love Is a Beautiful	Released: 1971; Format: LP; Label: Albert Productions (APLP 002)	49
Dave Mills Sings His Favourites	Released: 1978; Format: LP; Label: Universal Summit (SRA-250,589)	—
Life & Soul	Released: 1982; Format: LP; Label: Musico (MUS 1002)	—

=== Singles ===
Year	Single	Peak chart positions				
Year	Single	AUS	CAN	NZ	SA	ZIM
1969	"Theresa" / "Nobody" (SA & ZIM release)	—	—	—	2	1
1970	"Love Is a Beautiful Song" / "All the Tears in the World" (SA & ZIM release)	—	—	—	1 5	2
1971	"Home" / "Tomorrow Is Over" (SA-only release)	—	—	—	2 15	—
1971	"Love Is a Beautiful Song" (AUS & NZ release)	2	—	3	—	—
1971	"Mexico" (SA-only release)	—	—	—	19	—
1971	"Theresa" (AUS & NZ release)	67	—	—	—	—
1972	"If I Thought You'd Ever Change Your Mind" (AUS & NZ-only release)	—	—	—	—	—
1973	"Love Is a Beautiful Song" (US & CAN release)	—	20	—	—	—
1973	"Bring Back My Yesterdays" (AUS, NZ & CAN-only release)	—	—	—	—	—
1973	"I Can't Go Home to Mary" (SA-only release)	—	—	—	17	—
1974	"Jerusalem" (AUS & NZ-only release)	—	—	—	—	—
1977	"Let the Heartaches Begin" (AUS-only release)	—	—	—	—	—
