= Peter Teixeira =

South African politician

Councillor Peter Teixeira
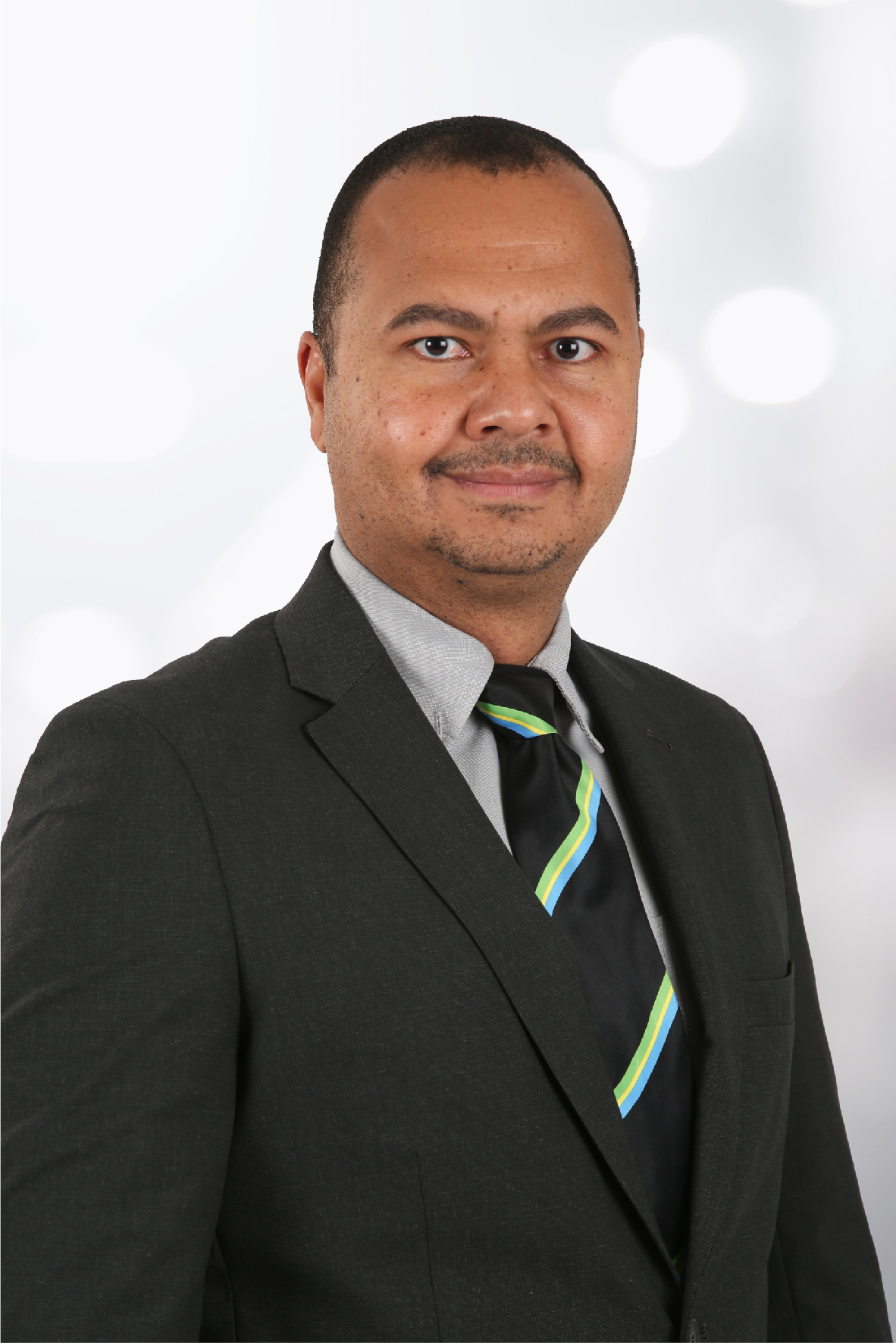
- Teixeira in 2021

Executive Mayor of the Midvaal Local Municipality
- Incumbent
- Assumed office 15 November 2021
- Preceded by: Bongani Baloyi

Personal details
- Party: Democratic Alliance

Peter Teixeira is a South African Democratic Alliance politician who is the Executive Mayor of the Midvaal Local Municipality.

== Early life ==
Teixeira grew up in Meyerton.

== Career ==
Teixeira joined the Democratic Alliance in 2014. During his time as a ward councillor, he served in three mayoral committee (MMC) posts and became the DA's constituency leader in Midvaal. After then Midvaal mayor Bongani Baloyi announced he would be stepping down at the next election, in September 2021 Teixeira was selected to replace him as the DA's candidate in the November municipal elections. Teixeira won with an increased majority. He was elected mayor on 15 November 2021.
