= Young Women's Leadership Charter School of Chicago =

Charter high school in Chicago, USA

Coordinates: 41°50′40″N 87°37′06″W

- Douglas, Chicago, Illinois; United States

Information
- Established: 1999
- Closed: 2019
- Grades: 9-12
- Gender: Girls

Young Women's Leadership Charter School (YWLCS) was a grade 9-12 charter high school for girls in the Douglas community area of Chicago, Illinois.

The school was established in 1999. As of 2016 it had almost 350 students; it was Chicago's only public school only for girls.

The school used a lottery to determine admission. The school is diverse, drawing from many neighborhoods.

The school closed in June 2019 due to lack of enrollment and financial issues.

== History ==
YWLCS opened in August 2000, as part of an effort to provide better education for disadvantaged young women on the South Side of Chicago. The charter school focuses on teaching math, science and technology - in response to statistics showing women are underrepresented in these fields. The YWLCS runs from ninth through grade twelve; providing a single sex education meant to ameliorate gender inequities in the classroom.

First located on the Illinois Institute of Technology campus, YWLCS has since moved into its own building nearby. Their first class graduated in June 2004; media personality Oprah Winfrey was the guest speaker. In 2005, the guest speaker at graduation was Michelle Obama.

The YWLCS founders drew inspiration from The Young Women's Leadership School of East Harlem, and the school maintains a loose affiliation with the network of Young Women's Leadership Foundation schools (TWYLS). Another TYWLS network school, The Young Women's Leadership School of Queens (New York) opened in September 2005, in the Jamaica neighborhood with a register of 81 students, under the leadership of new principal Avionne Gumbs.

== See also ==
- Oprah Winfrey Leadership Academy for Girls
