= Meyerton, Gauteng =

Meyerton
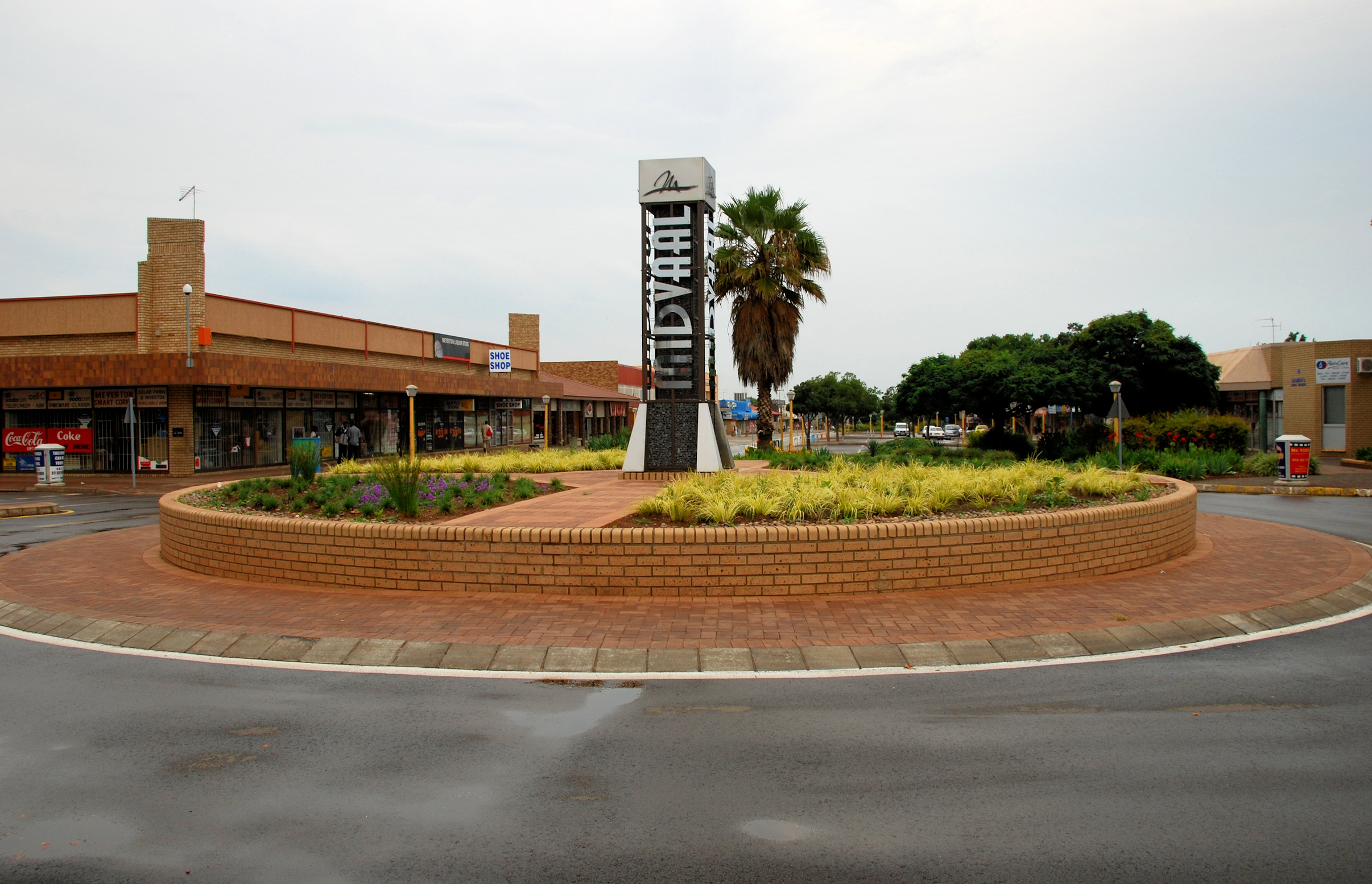
- Loch street in Meyerton

- Location within Gauteng Location within South Africa
- Coordinates: 26.5583°S 28.0197°E
- Country: South Africa
- Province: Gauteng
- District: Sedibeng
- Municipality: Midvaal

Area
  - Total: 180.24 km^{2} (69.59 sq mi)

Population (2011)
  - Total: 55,283
  - Density: 306.72/km^{2} (794.40/sq mi)

Racial makeup (2011)
  - Black African: 49.3%
  - Coloured: 1.2%
  - Indian/Asian: 0.5%
  - White: 48.6%
  - Other: 0.4%

First languages (2011)
  - Afrikaans: 42.2%
  - Sotho: 23.2%
  - English: 11.9%
  - Zulu: 9.1%
  - Other: 13.7%
- Time zone: UTC+2 (SAST)
- Postal code (street): 1961
- PO box: 1960
- Area code: 016

Meyerton is a small town lying 18 km north of Vereeniging in Gauteng, South Africa. It is situated in the Midvaal Local Municipality (of which it is the capital) in the Sedibeng District Municipality.

== History ==
Meyerton was established in 1891 and was named after Johannes Petrus Meyer, a field cornet and member of the Transvaal Volksraad. It acquired municipal status in 1961.

Since 2001, Meyerton has been the administrative centre for the Midvaal Local Municipality. Many projects have been undertaken to develop the area in the past 14 years.

Some of these projects, include:

- Development of Sicelo, a new neighbourhood for low-cost housing
- The R59-Corridor, a new development of factories and logistics facilities.
- Heineken International, Amsterdam announced on 26 March 2008 that it will build its new South African brewery in the Midvaal Municipal Area, between Vereeniging and Alberton, south of Johannesburg.

== Suburbs ==
Meyerton consists of the CBD, residential suburbs, industrial areas and farming communities. Some of the prominent neighbourhoods are;

- Golfpark
- Meyerton Ext 6
- Meyerton Ext 4
- Meyerton Ext 3
- Sicelo
- Henley-on-Klip
- Boltonwold
- Riversdale
- Rothdene
- Kookrus
- Glen Donald
- McKay Estates
- Risiville
- Valley settlements

== Interesting facts ==
Meyerton is often reported as being the home of the Oprah Winfrey Leadership Academy for Girls which officially opened in January 2007 at Henley-on-Klip, but Henley on Klip is in fact separated from Meyerton. Henley on Klip is a small village and a bird sanctuary outside of Meyerton.

Meyerton is the location of SABC shortwave broadcasting facilities at Bloemendal.

== Notable people ==
- Chris van Heerden, boxer
- Peter Teixeira, politician

== Crime ==
The latest annual crime statistics for the Meyerton Police Precinct was issued by the South African Police Service (SAPS) in 2021. The SAPS crime report showed the following information:

Type of crime	2018/2019	2019/2020	2020/2021
Murder	7	15	15
Sexual Offences	65	47	39
Assault with the intent to inflict grievous bodily harm	95	75	62
Burglary at non-residential premises	96	90	73
Burglary at residential premises	310	338	230
Theft of motor vehicle and motorcycle	156	81	60
Carjacking	25	25	19
