= Vaal Marina =

Place in Gauteng, South Africa

- Location within Gauteng Location within South Africa
- Coordinates: 26.875°S 28.226°E
- Country: South Africa
- Province: Gauteng
- District: Sedibeng
- Municipality: Midvaal

Area
  - Total: 25.06 km^{2} (9.68 sq mi)

Population (2011)
  - Total: 701
  - Density: 28.0/km^{2} (72.4/sq mi)

Racial makeup (2011)
  - Black African: 52.7%
  - Coloured: 1.4%
  - Indian/Asian: 0.4%
  - White: 44.6%
  - Other: 0.9%

First languages (2011)
  - English: 26.2%
  - Afrikaans: 25.5%
  - Sotho: 19.1%
  - Zulu: 8.7%
  - Other: 20.5%
- Time zone: UTC+2 (SAST)
- PO box: 1945

Vaal Marina is a town in Midvaal in the Gauteng province of South Africa.

Vaal Marina is one of the three villages on the shoreline of the Vaal Dam, the other two being Deneysville and Oranjeville.
