= Cocker Happy =

Compilation album by Joe Cocker
- Released: July 1971
- Recorded: 1968–1970
- Genre: Blues
- Label: Fly/Interfusion

Joe Cocker chronology
| Mad Dogs And Englishmen (1970) | Cocker Happy (1971) | Double Cocker Power (1972) |

Professional ratings
Review scores
| Source | Rating |
|---|---|
| Allmusic | 3/5 stars |

Cocker Happy is a "best of" compilation album by English rock/blues singer Joe Cocker, released in Australia, Spain and New Zealand in 1971 on Interfusion Records. It spent 8 weeks at the top of the Australian album charts in 1971.

== Track listing ==
1. "Hitchcock Railway" (Don Dunn, Tony McCashen)
2. "She Came In Through the Bathroom Window" (John Lennon, Paul McCartney)
3. "Marjorine" (Joe Cocker, Frank Myles, Tom Rattigan, Chris Stainton)
4. "She's So Good to Me" (Cocker, Stainton)
5. "Hello Little Friend" (Leon Russell)
6. "With a Little Help from My Friends" (Lennon, McCartney)
7. "Delta Lady" (Russell)
8. "Darling Be Home Soon" (John Sebastian)
9. "Do I Still Figure in Your Life" (Pete Dello)
10. "Feelin' Alright" (Dave Mason)
11. "Something's Coming On" (Cocker, Stainton)
12. "The Letter" (Wayne Carson Thompson)

== Personnel ==
- Joe Cocker – Vocals

== Chart positions ==
| Year | Chart | Position |
|---|---|---|
| 1971 | Go-Set Australian National Albums Chart | 1 |
| 1971 | New Zealand | 32 |
