= Oprah Winfrey Leadership Academy for Girls =

School in Gauteng Province, South Africa

Coordinates: 26°32′49″S 28°03′19″E

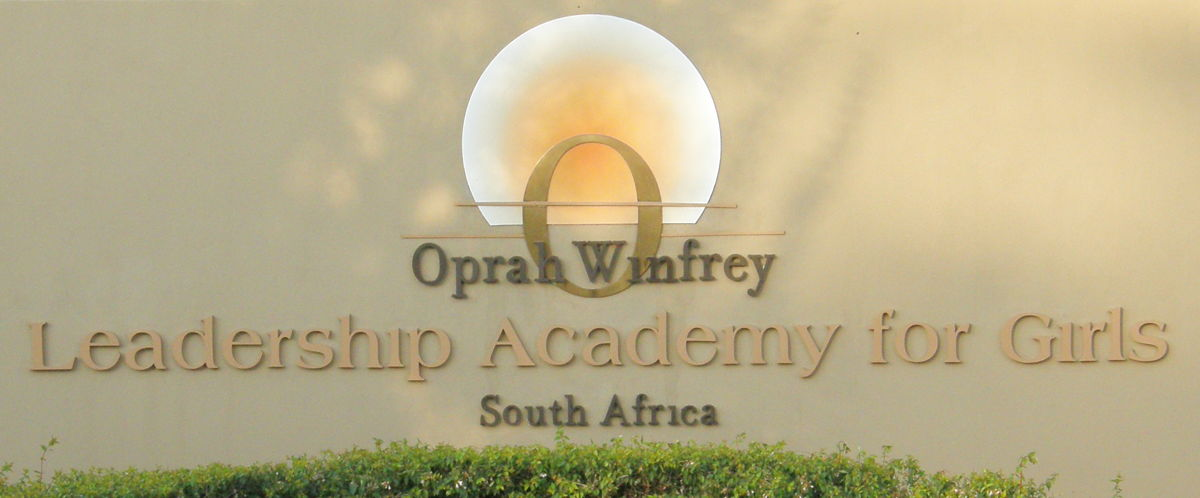
- Sign at the academy entrance – April 2015
- Henley on Klip; South Africa

Information
- Type: Independent Secondary School
- Established: January 2007
- Superintendent: Gugu Ndebele (executive director)
- Faculty: 33
- Grades: 8 to 12
- Enrollment: 322
- Website: www.owlag.co.za

The Oprah Winfrey Leadership Academy for Girls – South Africa (OWLAG) is a boarding school for girls, grades 8–12, in Henley on Klip, Gauteng Province, South Africa. The school is a project begun by the American entrepreneur and philanthropist Oprah Winfrey in 2002, after discussion with former South African president Nelson Mandela in 2000. OWLAG opened in 2007, and its inaugural class of 72 girls graduated in 2011.

Inspired by her own disadvantaged childhood, Winfrey stated that she founded the Leadership Academy to provide educational and leadership opportunities for academically gifted girls from impoverished backgrounds in South Africa who exhibited leadership qualities for making a difference in the world. She wanted to help girls who grew up like her, "economically disadvantaged, but not poor in mind or spirit".

The school teaches the Independent Examinations Board (IEB) curriculum writes the South African National Senior Certificate.

In May 2021, Lindiwe Tsope became the first graduate of the Academy to be awarded a PhD.

== Design and construction ==
Structured as a campus, facilities include classrooms, computer and science laboratories, library, an auditorium/gymnasium, amphitheatre, sports fields, modern dormitories and a dining hall. The school was designed by Rose Mashabane Architects and built between 2006 and 2007 by Concor Construction.

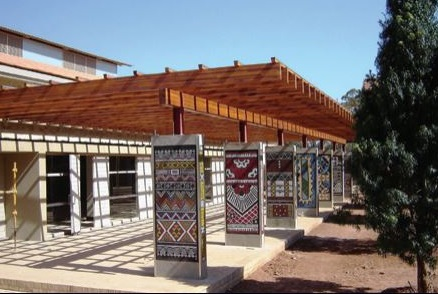
Oprah Winfrey Leadership Academy for Girls, Gauteng, South Africa, 2007.

== Criticisms and controversies ==
Winfrey received much criticism surrounding the "extravagance" of the school, with mention, among other things, about the need for high thread-count sheets for the dormitory beds, a beauty salon, two theatres (one indoor, one outdoor) and a yoga classroom to educate girls in an impoverished region of South Africa. In an article about the school's unveiling, Allison Samuels of Newsweek questioned whether the $40 million spent might have benefited a far greater number of students had the money been spent with less emphasis on luxurious surroundings and more emphasis on practicality.

Winfrey defended her decision to establish the Leadership Academy in South Africa by offering the following observation:

I think the reason not just Africa but the world is in the state that it is because of a lack of leadership on all levels of government ... and particularly in regard to schools and schooling for poor children. ... The best way to effect change long term is to ... give children exposure and opportunity and nurture them to understand their own power and possibility.

Rebecca Traister of Salon.com and Karen Russell of The Huffington Post wrote in defense of the school. Russell then cited the success of Ellen Johnson Sirleaf, Africa's first female President who restored Liberia’s electricity, as an example of what can happen when the best and brightest girls in Africa are given a world-class education. She praised Winfrey for sending the message that Black people and women have value.

Other criticisms that Winfrey received about the Leadership Academy included the racial makeup of students, with the majority of students selected and accepted as candidates for the school being black. Winfrey deflected this criticism by saying that the "school is open to all girls who are disadvantaged. All girls, all races, who are disadvantaged ... [including] White, Indian and Native American students of varying faiths," as long as eligibility requirements were met. Many of girls chosen for the Leadership Academy come from families affected by HIV/AIDS.

In spite of the criticism, Winfrey offered that her vision for the Leadership Academy was to provide a vehicle for mentoring academically talented and disadvantaged girls with "that 'It' quality" to provide them with opportunities to "change the face of a nation," make a difference in the world and become future leaders of South Africa. As for rationale of the lavishness of the school, Winfrey continued by saying that "[i]f you are surrounded by beautiful things and wonderful teachers who inspire you, that beauty brings out the beauty in you." To change how women are viewed, Winfrey added during an interview, one must look for an opportunity "'to change the paradigm, to change the way not only these girls think ... but to also change the way a culture feels about what women can do.' 'Girls who are educated are less likely to get HIV/AIDS and in this country which has such a pandemic, we have to begin to change the pandemic.'"

=== 2007 incidents ===
In the school's first year, a female member of the school staff was accused of physically and sexually abusing students. Winfrey flew to South Africa to meet with school officials and parents. The dorm matron was arrested after seven students submitted statements alleging assault and various accusations of abuse. A specialist on sexual violence with the South African Medical Research Council praised Winfrey's response as "phenomenal" because it sent a powerful message in a country afflicted with record high levels of sexual abuse. On 23 March 2010, the Associated Press reported that Winfrey settled the defamation lawsuit filed by one of the headmistresses at the Academy before the trial began.

In March 2007, some parents complained because they were only allowed to visit their children once a month and the girls were only allowed to use their cell phones on weekends. John Samuels, the executive head of the school responded to the complaints by appealing to security and school spirit.

== Praise ==
There have also been reports of praise for the school. According to Masechaba Hine, whose daughter and granddaughter both attend the school, her children "have no problems about the school, they are happy about everything." Hine has been so pleased with the experience that she even praised Winfrey personally, saying, "Oprah is an angel, she is God-sent...She came to my rescue when my husband was not working."

=== Praise from Nelson Mandela ===
One of the academy's most vocal fans was Nelson Mandela, who called Winfrey his hero because she understood that South Africa's gains in democracy would be nullified unless future generations were educated.

The Oprah Winfrey Leadership Academy for Girls—located near Johannesburg and educating girls in Grades 8 through 12—is therefore a wonderfully appropriate gift to the people of South Africa, one that will endure over many lifetimes. When I went to the opening of her school, I looked at the shining faces of these young women and thought every one of them has the potential to be an Oprah Winfrey. The school is important because it will change the trajectory of these girls' lives and it will brighten the future of all women in South Africa. Oprah understands that in Africa, women and girls have often been doubly disadvantaged. They have had the curse of low expectations and unequal opportunities.

— Nelson Mandela quoted in Time

=== Praise from Bill Clinton ===
The academy was honoured by Bill Clinton when he featured it in his book Giving: How Each of Us Can Change the World as an example of how to give back to the world. Clinton predicted that the school would change the lives of many young women and interviewed Winfrey to find out why she decided to build the school. Winfrey explained that caring teachers "made education an open door" for her and that she wanted to help girls who grew up like her, "economically disadvantaged, but not poor in mind or spirit".

== See also ==
- List of boarding schools
- Young Women's Leadership Charter School of Chicago
