= Midvaal Local Municipality =

Midvaal
- Local municipality
- Seal

- Location in Gauteng
- Coordinates: 26°35′S 28°05′E
- Country: South Africa
- Province: Gauteng
- District: Sedibeng
- Seat: Meyerton
- Wards: 15

Government
  - Type: Municipal council
  - Mayor: Peter Teixeira (DA)

Area
  - Total: 1,722 km^{2} (665 sq mi)

Population (2022)
  - Total: 112,254
  - Density: 65.19/km^{2} (168.8/sq mi)

Racial makeup (2022)
  - Black African: 69.7%
  - Coloured: 1.5%
  - Indian/Asian: 1.3%
  - White: 27.3%

First languages (2011)
  - Afrikaans: 30.9%
  - Sotho: 27.9%
  - English: 14.0%
  - Zulu: 11.8%
  - Other: 15.4%
- Time zone: UTC+2 (SAST)
- Municipal code: GT422

Midvaal Municipality (Afrikaans: Midvaal Munisipaliteit; Sotho: Masepala wa Midvaal; Zulu: UMasipala wase Midvaal) is a local municipality within the Sedibeng District Municipality, in the Gauteng province of South Africa. The municipality's name references its geographical location in-between the Johannesburg and East Rand areas and the Vaal and Vereeniging areas.

Midvaal Municipality is the fastest growing municipality in Gauteng due to its rapid economic growth. Midvaal has undergone a radical change from a quaint country area to a booming tourist, recreational and industrial centre in southern Gauteng. Midvaal has grown from 60,000 residents in 2001 to about 100,000 in 2011. A report by the Gauteng Provincial Government ranked Midvaal as the province's top municipality in terms of quality of life. In December 2010, Midvaal was ranked 23rd out of 231 municipalities.

The Oprah Winfrey School was established in the area. In addition, golfer Greg Norman invested into the Eye of Africa Golfing Estate development, for which he designed the golf course. The municipality's major achievement has been attracting Sedibeng Breweries, South Africa's distributors of Heineken, into the area. The brewery has set up its national offices along the R59 freeway corridor and has brought with it new opportunities for job creation and small businesses.

== Politics ==
The municipal council consists of thirty members elected by mixed-member proportional representation. Fifteen councillors are elected by first-past-the-post voting in fifteen wards, while the remaining fifteen are chosen from party lists so that the total number of party representatives is proportional to the number of votes received. In the election of 4 November 2026 the Democratic Alliance (DA) won a majority of nineteen seats on the council.

The following table shows the results of the election.

Party	Ward			List			Total seats
Party	Votes	%	Seats	Votes	%	Seats	Total seats
Democratic Alliance	24,478	61.34	13	24,844	62.50	6	19
African National Congress	6,733	16.87	2	6,072	15.27	3	5
Freedom Front Plus	3,059	7.67	0	3,038	7.64	2	2
Economic Freedom Fighters	1,525	3.82	0	1,504	3.78	1	1
uMkhonto weSizwe Party	1,246	3.12	0	1,275	3.21	1	1
ActionSA	1,131	2.83	0	1,242	3.12	1	1
Transformative Yes Movement	471	1.18	0	435	1.09	1	1
17 other parties	1,265	3.17	0	1,342	3.38	0	0
Total	39,908	100.00	15	39,752	100.00	15	30
Valid votes	39,908	98.31		39,752	98.54		
Invalid/blank votes	685	1.69		590	1.46		
Total votes	40,593	100.00		40,342	100.00		
Registered voters/turnout	66,306	61.22		66,306	60.84		

== Demographics ==
Group	2001 Census	%	2011 Census	%	Change	% Change
Black African	38,168	59.05%	55,643	58.39%	17,475 ▲	0.66% ▼
White	25,295	39.13%	36,869	38.69%	11,574 ▲	0.44% ▼
Coloured	888	1.37%	1,558	1.63%	670 ▲	0.26% ▲
Indian or Asian	291	0.45%	750	0.79%	459 ▲	0.34% ▲
Other	No Data	–	480	0.50%	n/a	n/a
Total population	64,642	100.00%	95,301	100.00%	30,659 ▲	47.4% ▲

== Main places ==
The 2001 census divided the municipality into the following main places:

Place	Code	Area (km^{2})	Population	Most spoken language
Evaton	70502	1.39	3,406	Sotho
Meyerton	70503	114.28	24,215	Afrikaans
Randvaal	70505	74.14	7,933	English
Suikerbosrand Nature Reserve	70506	113.79	0	-
Vaal Marina	70507	2.60	9	Sotho
Walkerville	70509	151.54	9,662	English
Remainder of the municipality	70504	1,218.44	12,723	Sotho
