= Kent Music Report =

Australian music chart between 1974 and 1998

Kent Music Report front cover 11 October 1976

The Kent Music Report was a weekly record chart of Australian music singles and albums which was compiled by music historian David Kent from May 1974 through to January 1999. The chart was re-branded the Australian Music Report (AMR) in July 1987. From June 1988, the Australian Recording Industry Association, which had been using the top 50 portion of the report under licence since mid-1983, chose to produce their own listing as the ARIA Charts.

Before the Kent Report, Go-Set magazine published weekly Top 40 Singles from 1966, and albums charts from 1970 until the magazine's demise in August 1974.

David Kent later published Australian charts from 1940 to 1973 in a retrospective fashion, using state by state chart data obtained from various Australian radio stations.

== Background ==
Kent had spent a number of years previously working in the music industry at both EMI and Phonogram records and had developed the report initially as a hobby. The Kent Music Report was first released on a commercial drive basis in July 1974 and was offered for subscription.

The report data was initially based solely on radio station charts from around the country, which were then amalgamated using a points based ranking system that Kent had developed. These radio station charts were compiled primarily using data collected from local record stores and, as such, were based primarily on retail sales (i.e. they were not airplay charts).

In 1976, as funding from subscriptions grew, Kent himself started collecting sales data from retail stores to supplement the radio station charts (which were also based on sales data). His operation grew and staff were employed to assist with research. Within a year or so, the major record companies started using the Report for their own marketing programs and it had established itself as the leading national chart publication.

From 1982, retail sales data collected by Kent and his staff were used exclusively and radio station charts were dropped from the primary tabulations. Some radio station chart data was used as supplementary information, however.

At about the same time, the Australian Recording Industry Association was established by the major record companies, being EMI, Festival Records (later FMR, now known as Warner Music), CBS (now known as Sony Music), RCA (later BMG, now known as Sony Music), WEA (now known as Warner Music) and Polygram (now known as Universal). From mid-1983 until early June 1988, ARIA had a licensing arrangement with Kent to use the top 50 portion of the Report under their own banner. In 1988, the arrangement with ARIA ended, and the ARIA Charts were produced in-house by the Association.

On 4 January 1999, the AMR charts ceased publishing, leaving the ARIA Charts as the only nationally recognised chart publication.

== Further chart work published by David Kent ==
In 1993, David Kent published his Australian Chart Book 1970–1992. This was based on his chart data already published as the Kent Music Report from May 1974 onward. He specially "retro-calculated" charts based on state-based Australian radio station charts available to him dated before May 1974, to fill in the missing years (1970–1974). On this basis, he also put together Australian national charts from 1940 to 1969, published as Australian Chart Book 1940–1969 in 2005. Before 1949, radio station music charts in Australia were only available on a monthly basis, and this is reflected in his published data. Although ARIA published the official Australian National charts from 1988 onwards, Kent continued to calculate charts from this date, data from which were published in a third book in his Australian Chart Book series.

== See also ==
- List of number-one albums in Australia during the 1970s
- List of number-one albums in Australia during the 1980s
- List of number-one singles in Australia during the 1970s
- List of number-one singles in Australia during the 1980s
